= List of Yamaha Corporation products =

This is a list of products made by Yamaha Corporation. This does not include products made by Bösendorfer, which has been a wholly owned subsidiary of Yamaha Corporation since February 1, 2008.

For products made by Yamaha Motor Company, see the list of Yamaha motorcycles. Yamaha Motor Company shares the brand name but has been a separate company since 1955.

== Musical instruments ==
=== Pianos ===
In 1900, Yamaha started to manufacture pianos.

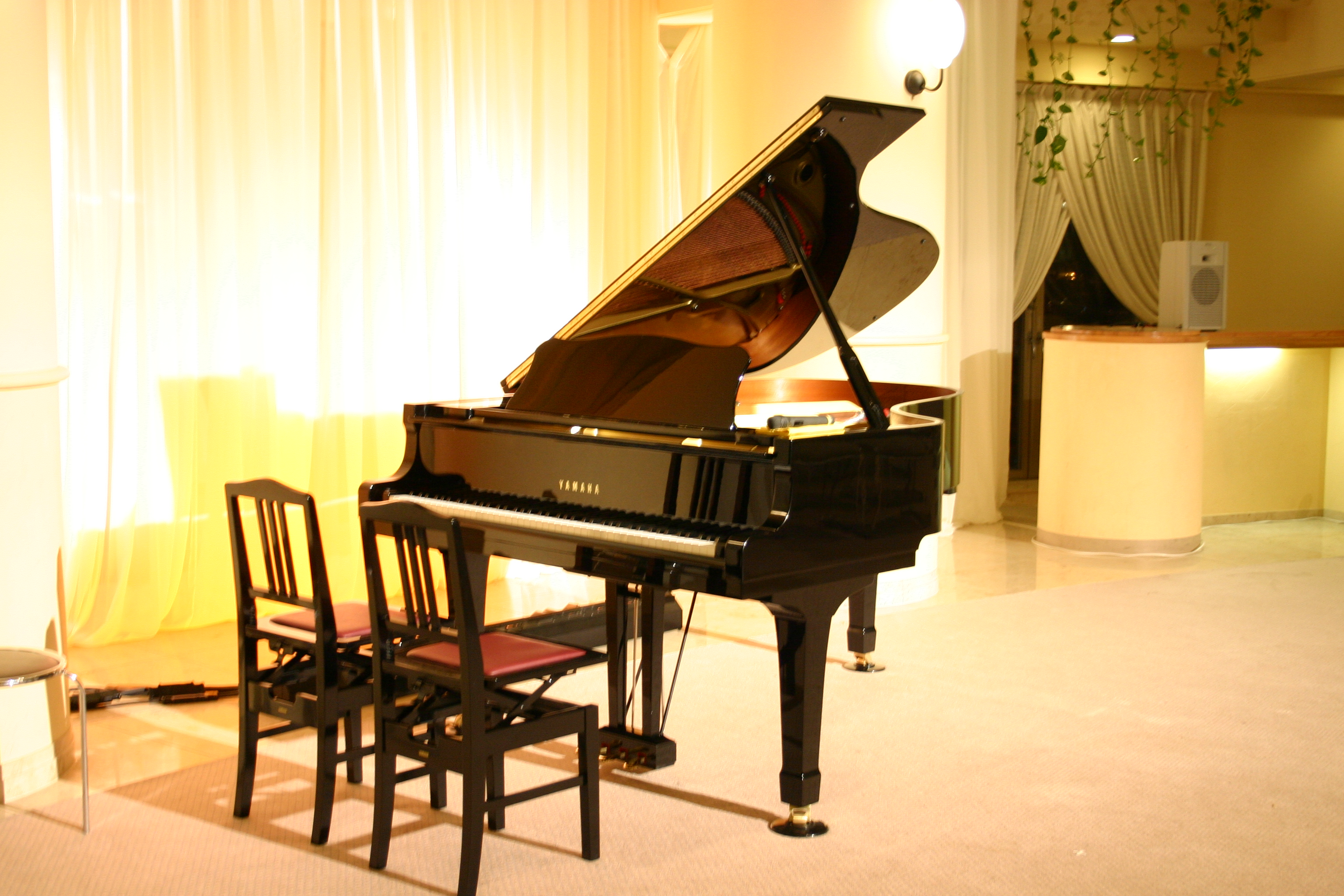
Yamaha grand piano

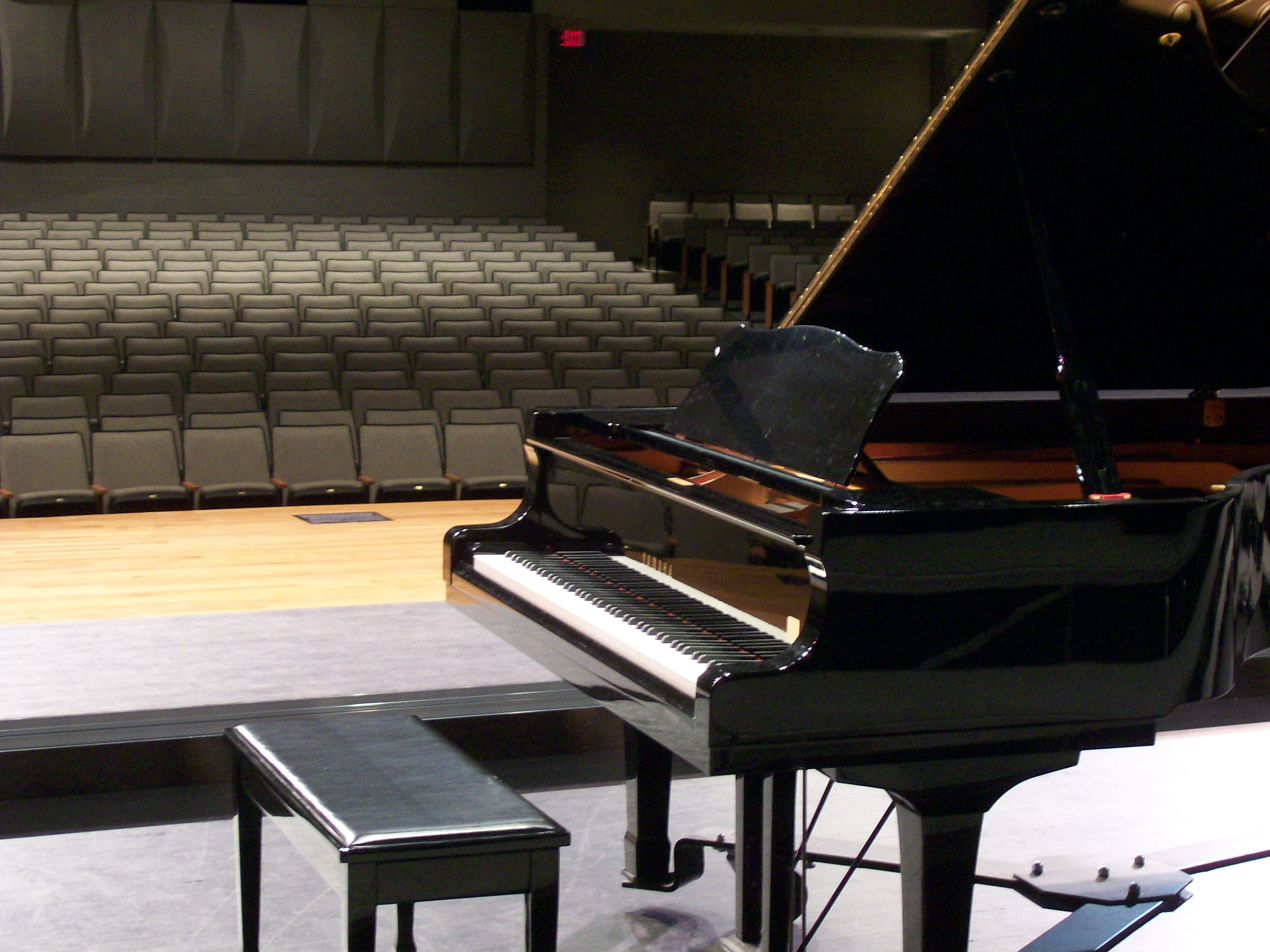
C6 Concert Grand

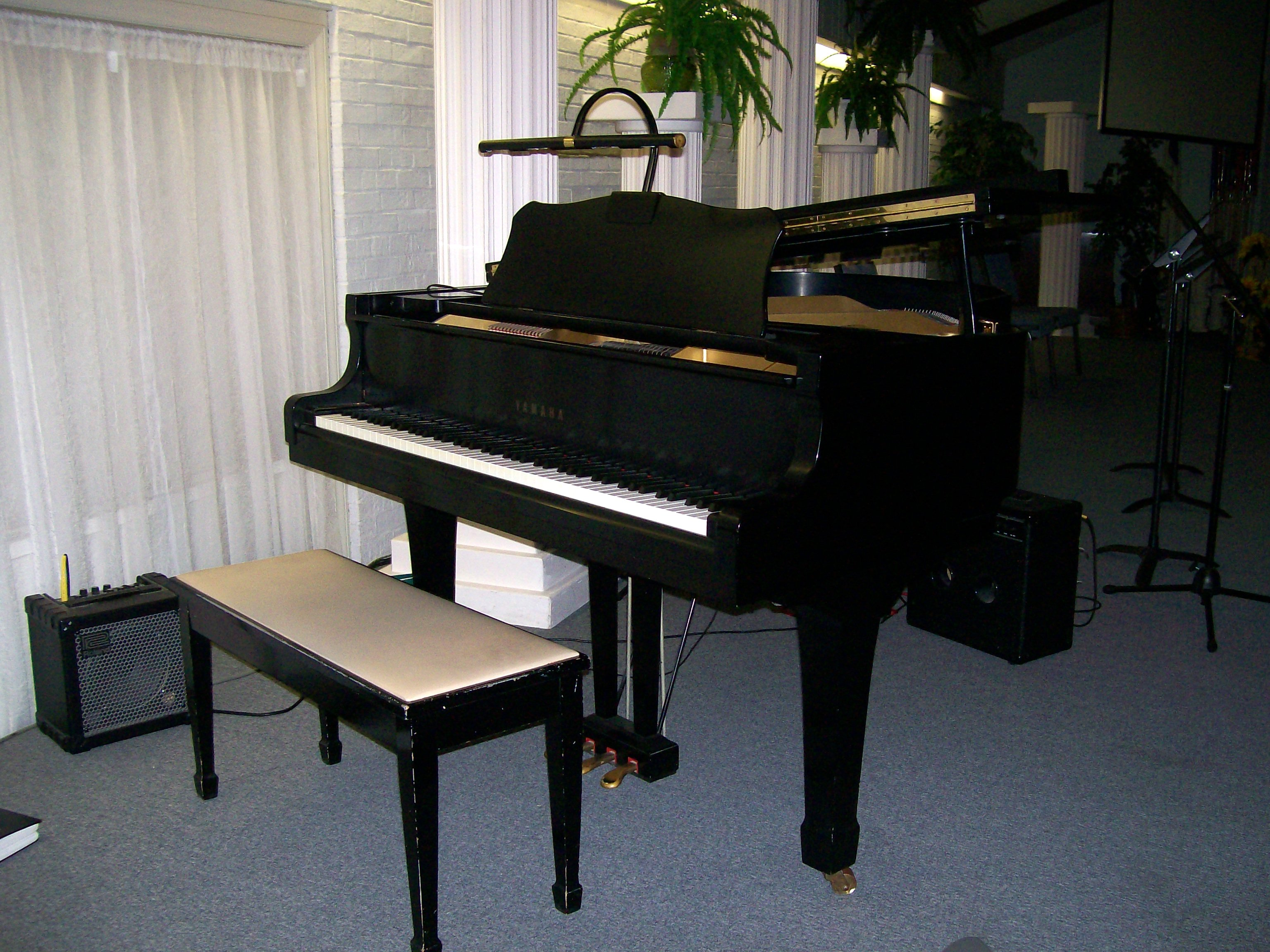
G2 Grand piano

==== Grand pianos ====
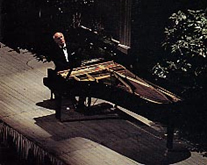

CFIIIS sound

CF series (full length concert grand)

- FC / CF (1949–67 / 1967–91)
- CFIII (1983–2000)
- CFIIIS (1991–2010)
- CF4 (2010–
- CF6 (2010–
- CFX (2010–)

C series (including several G)

- G1 / C1 / C1x (1988–94 / 1994–2012 / 2012–)
- DC1A
- #20 / G2 / C2 /C2x (~1934–55 / 1947–94 / 1994–2012 / 2012–)
- G2F / DG2FII
- C3 / C3x (1967–2012 / 2012–)
- #35 / G5 / new C5 / C5x (1948–1953 / 1954–94 / 1994–2008 / 2012–)
- old C5 / C6 / C7 (1979–94 / 1994–2012)
- G7 / C7 / C7x (1954–67 / 1967–2008 / 2012–)
- SC / CS (1953–67 / 1967–79)

G series

Note: prefix D means Disklavier

suffix S / SG means Silent grand

- G1, G2, G5, G7 (listed on C series)
- #25 / G3 (1949–53 / 1954–94)
- GA1E / DGA1[XG][E] (Polished Ebony finish)
- GC1
- GC1S / GC1SG (2002–)
- GC1G / GC1FP (Georgian Brown mahogany / French Provincial Brown Cherry)
- GC1M* / DGC1 / DGC1ME3 (*In North America, GC1 was introduced without the sostenuto pedal, instead (it was bass sustain. In 2007, it finally launched in Europe, but never having received the non sostenuto version, there was no need to add the M designation; whereas in North America, the GC1M was also launched in 2007 to distinguish between the earlier version. Confusingly, GC1M's from NA are the same as GC1 from EU, while GC1 from NA is a completely different model. This confusion could have been avoided if they'd simply named the European ones the same, CG1M)
- GC2
- GH1 / GH1G
- GT7

A series (branched from C series)

- A1 (1993–)
- A1[L][S][SG]
- DA1IIXG / DA1E3 / DA1M4
- EA1 (2000–08)

S series

- S4 (1994–)
- S4BB
- DS4E3PRO PE
- S6 (1994–)
- S6BB
- DS6E3PRO PE
- S400B (1982–94)
- S700E (1989–94)

Z series

- Z1 (2003–07)
- Z1B

==== Baby grand pianos ====
- GB1
- GB1K / DGB1CD — most compact models (depth: 151 cm or 59 in) on current product line

==== Upright pianos ====
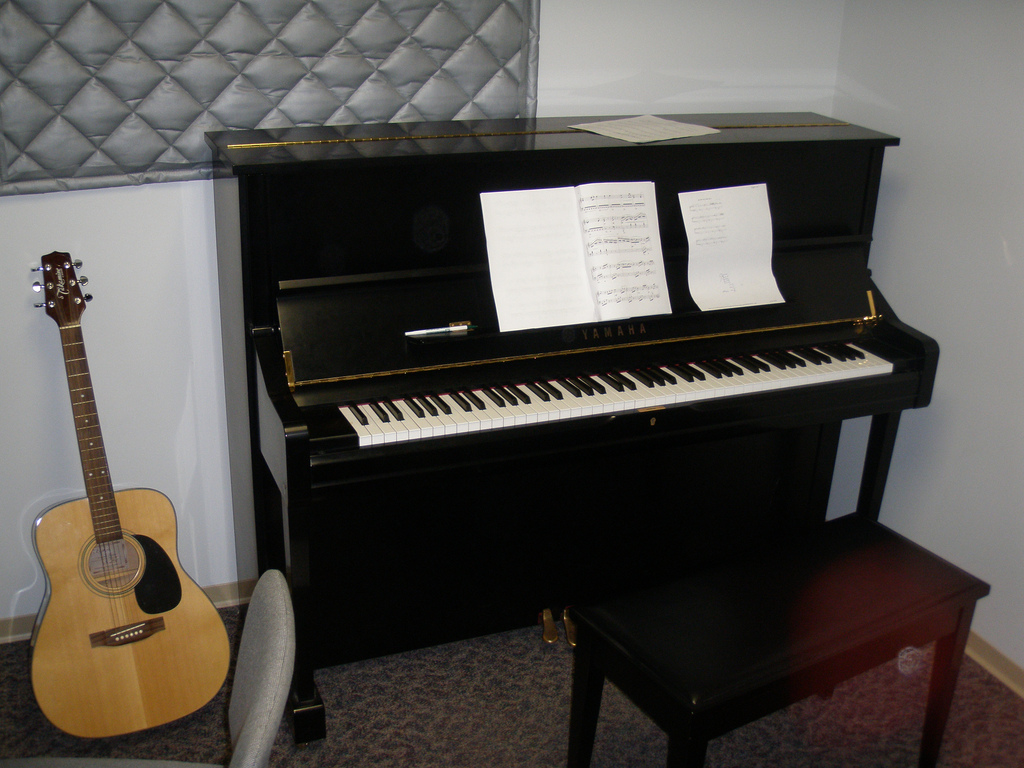
U1

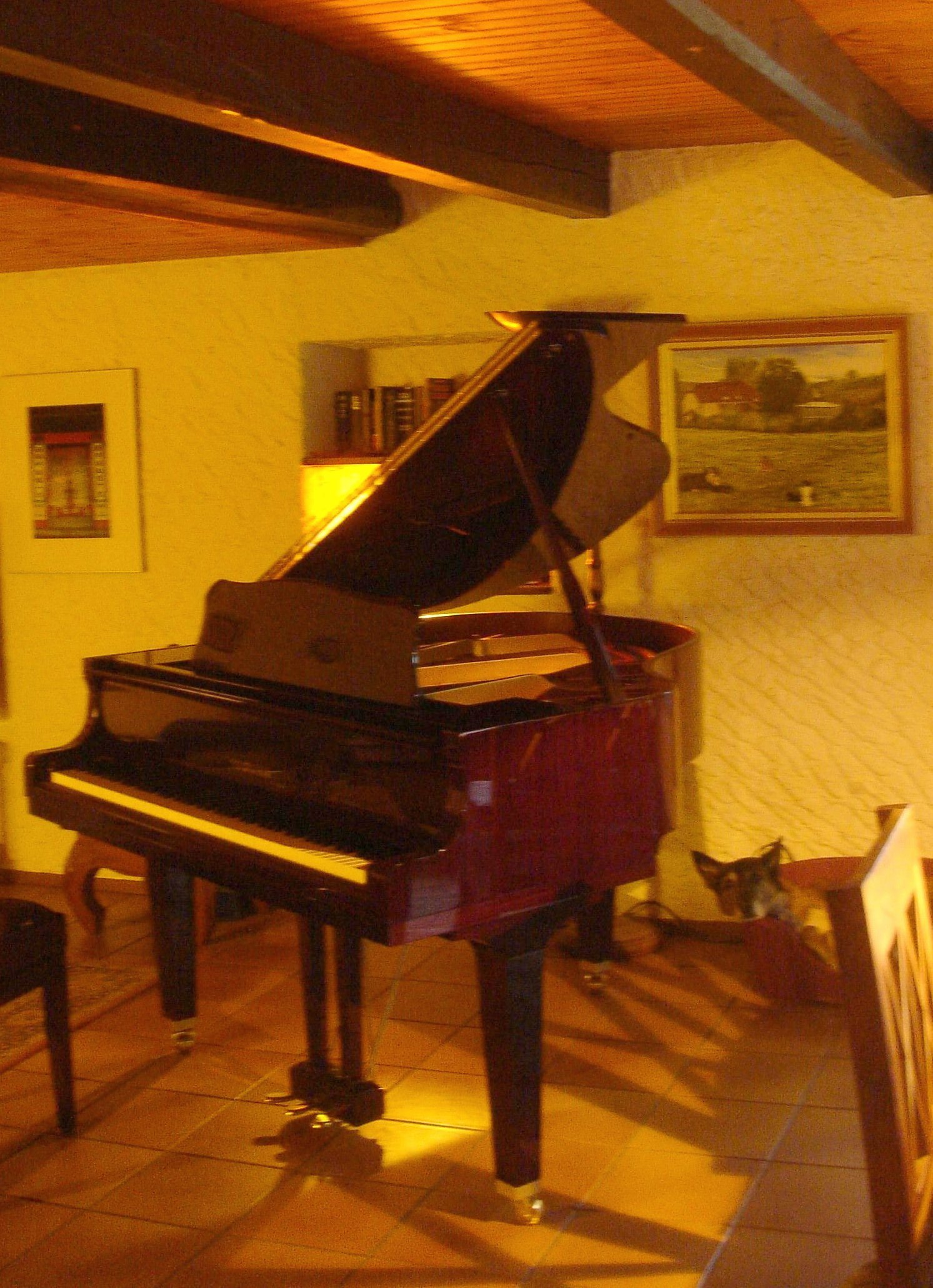
GB1 Baby Grand

- B1
- B2
- B3
- Hosseschrueders HC 10
- Hosseschrueders HC 30
- C108
- M460
- M560
- P121
- P22
- P660
- SU118C
- T118
- T121
- U1
- U10
- U10 BL
- U100
- U2
- U2M
- U3
- U30
- U300
- U5
- U7
- UX
- UX1
- UX10
- UX100
- UX3
- UX30
- UX300
- UX5
- UX50
- UX500
- YU116D/W
- YUA
- YUS1
- YUS3
- YUS5
- YUX
- SU7

==== Player pianos ====
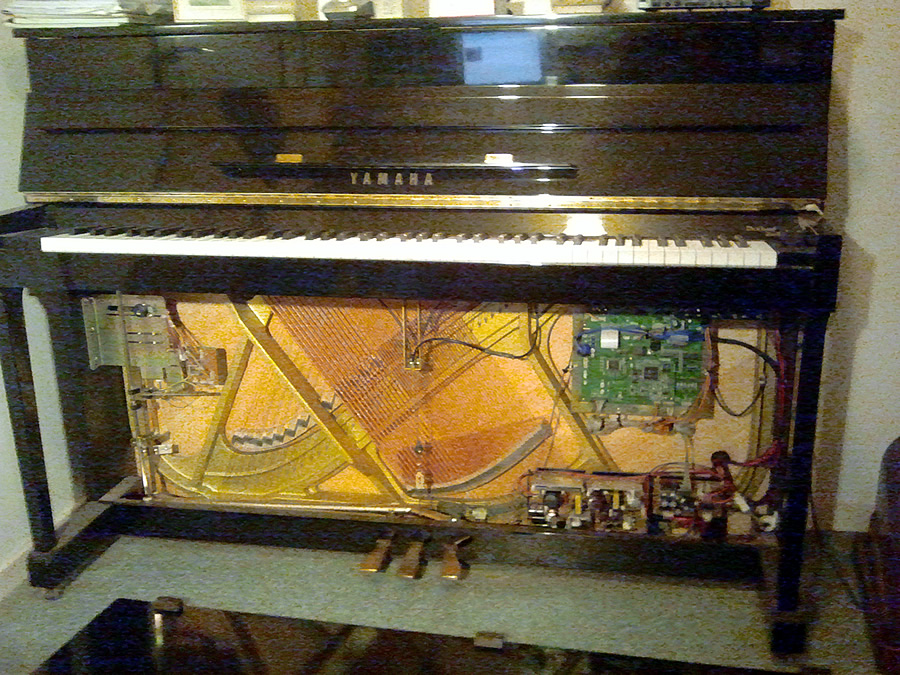
Disklavier (upright model)

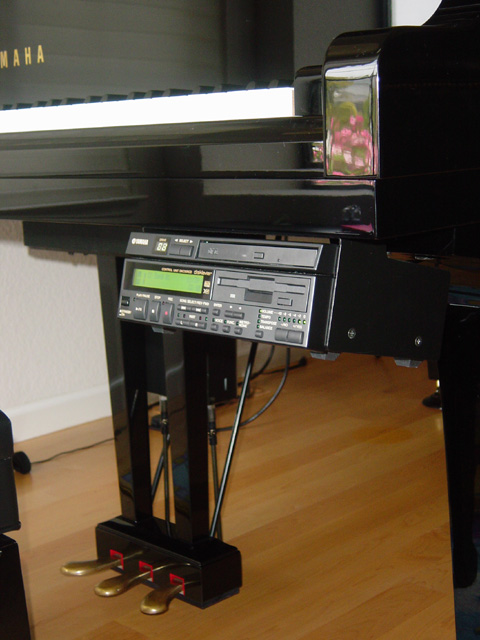
Control unit

- Disklavier
  - Disklavier E3 series

disklavier control unit
control unit for player piano, consists with MIDI recorder and PCM sound

- DKC-850 (MIDI recorder with PCM sound (AWM2))
- EMR1 (MIDI recorder with PCM sound (AWM2:XG/GM))

==== Silent pianos ====
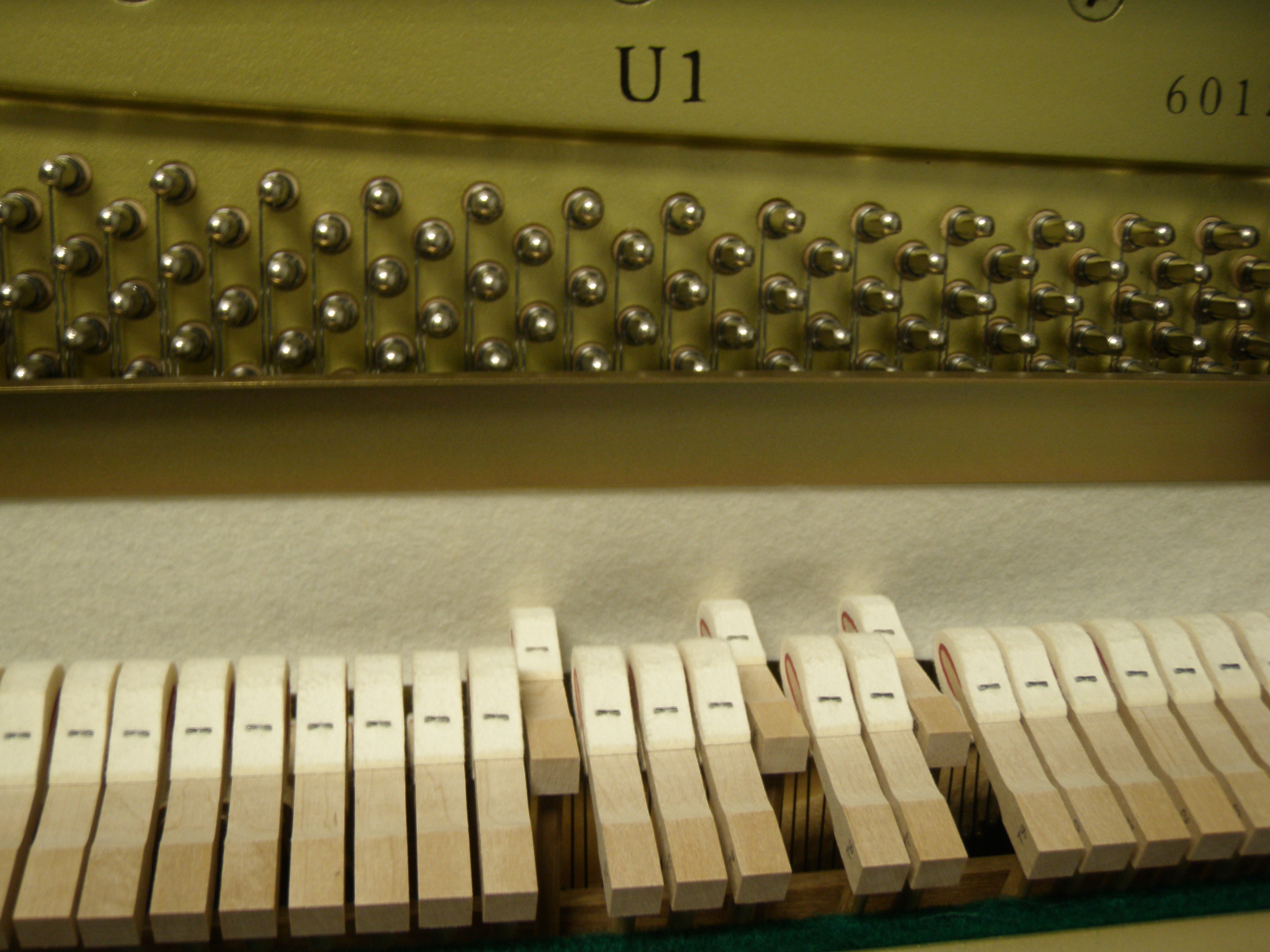
Silent piano system on U1 (silencer interposing hammers)

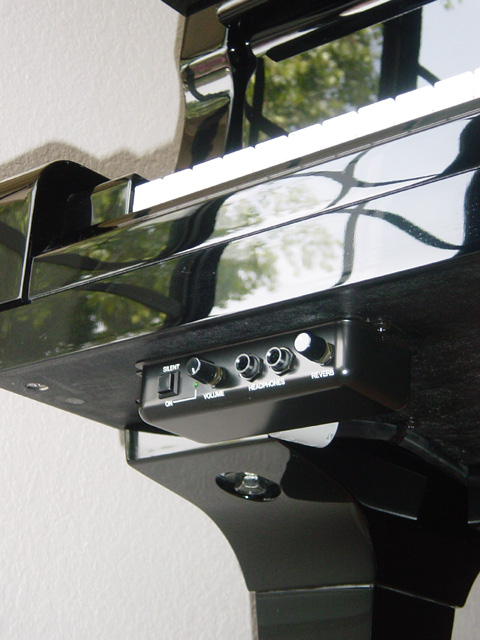
Control unit

silent piano system
silencer & optical sensor, with PCM sound & MIDI recorder unit

- RSG-1 / RSG-3 / RSG-5 / RSG-10 / RSG-30 (2008, for U1/U3/-/UX10/b121/YF&b113)

ensemble unit

- RE-1 / RE-3 / RE-10 / RE-30 (1999, for U1/U3/UX10/W100)

silent ensemble unit

- RSE-1 / RSE-3 / RSE-10 (1999, for U1/U3/UX10)

Newer Silent Piano Systems

- SG-1 - ? - ?
- SG-2 - ? - ?
- SC-1 (Aka. SC) - ? -
- SC-2 - ? - 2023
- SC-3 - 2022 onwards

SC series found in Upright B1, B2, B3 and Grand GB1K - "entry level" models.

- SH-1 (Aka. SH)
- SH-2 - ? - 2023
- SH-3 - 2022 onwards

SH series silent modules found in more up market models such as Uprights P116, P121, U1, U3, YUS1, YUS3, YUS5, SE122, SE132, SU7 and Grand S3X, S5X, S6X, S7X, C1X, C2X, C3X, C3X Chrome, C5X, C6X, GC1 and GC2. (at the time of writing according to Yamaha.com).

TransAcoustic (Silent with a transducer added to essentially make the piano one big speaker)

- TA-1 (Aka TA)
- TA-2
- TA-3 2023 onwards

Found in uprights: U1, U3, YUS1, YUS3, YUS5 and Grands GC1 and C1X according to yamaha.com

==== Hybrid pianos ====
===== Hybrid grand pianos =====
- AvantGrand N1X (2019-)
- AvantGrand N3X (2016-)
- AvantGrand N3 (2009-2016)
- AvantGrand N2 (2009-)
- AvantGrand N1 (2011-2019)
- DGP-7
- DGP-5
- DGP-2
- DGP-1

===== Hybrid upright pianos =====
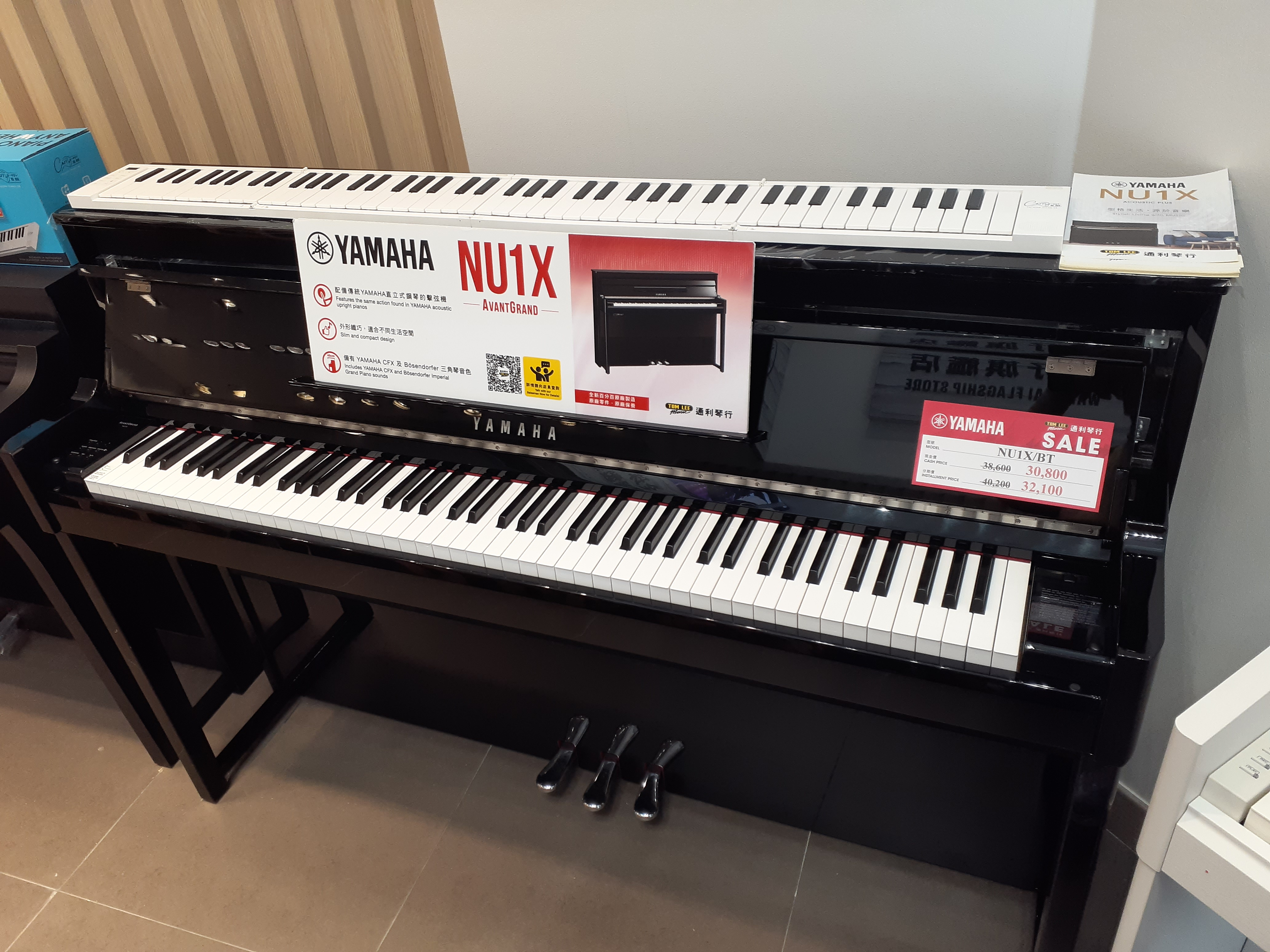
NU1X hybrid upright piano (2017-2023)

- NU1XA (2023-)
- NU1X (2017-2023)
- NU1 (2012-2017)
- DUP-22 (2009–2012)
- DUP-8 (2009–2012)
- DUP-20 (2001–2009)
- DUP-7 (2001–2009)
- DUP-10 (1998–2001)
- DUP-5 (1998–2001)
- DUP-1 (1996–1998)

==== Stage pianos ====
===== Electric pianos =====
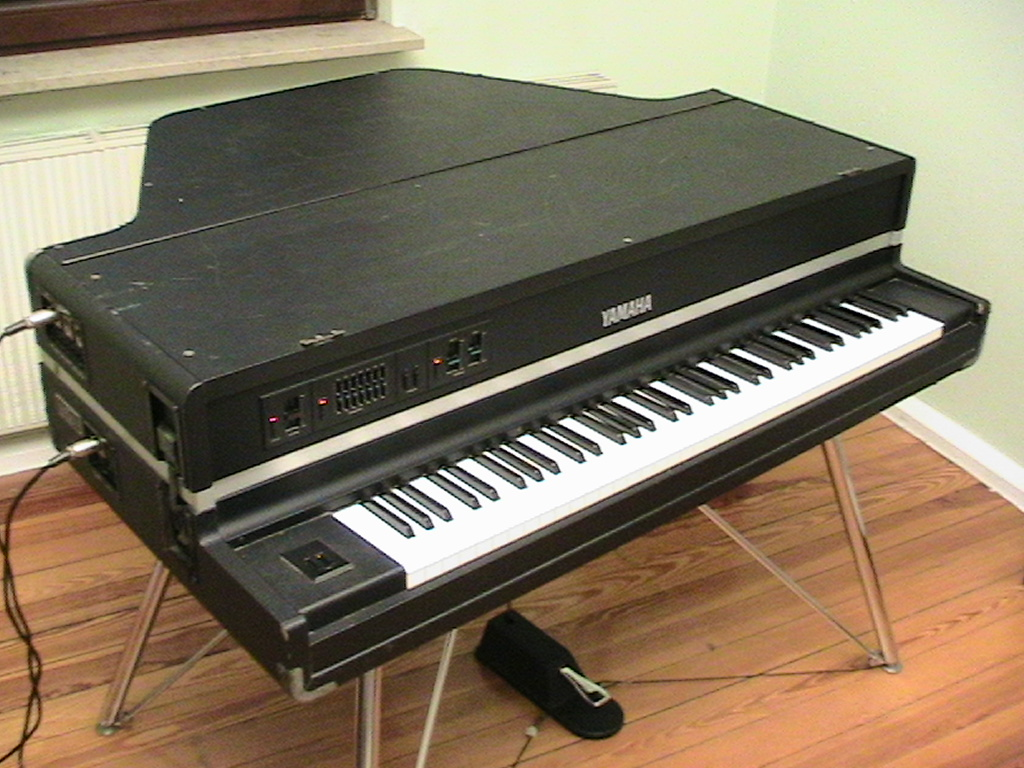
CP-70M electric grand piano

CP series (electric grand)

- CP-60M (upright, with MIDI)
- CP-70
- CP-70B
- CP-70D (with 7-band GEQ)
- CP-70M (with 7-band GEQ & MIDI)
- CP-80 (1978-1986)
- CP-80D (with 7-band GEQ)
- CP-80M (with 7-band GEQ & MIDI) (1986-1988)

===== Analog stage pianos =====
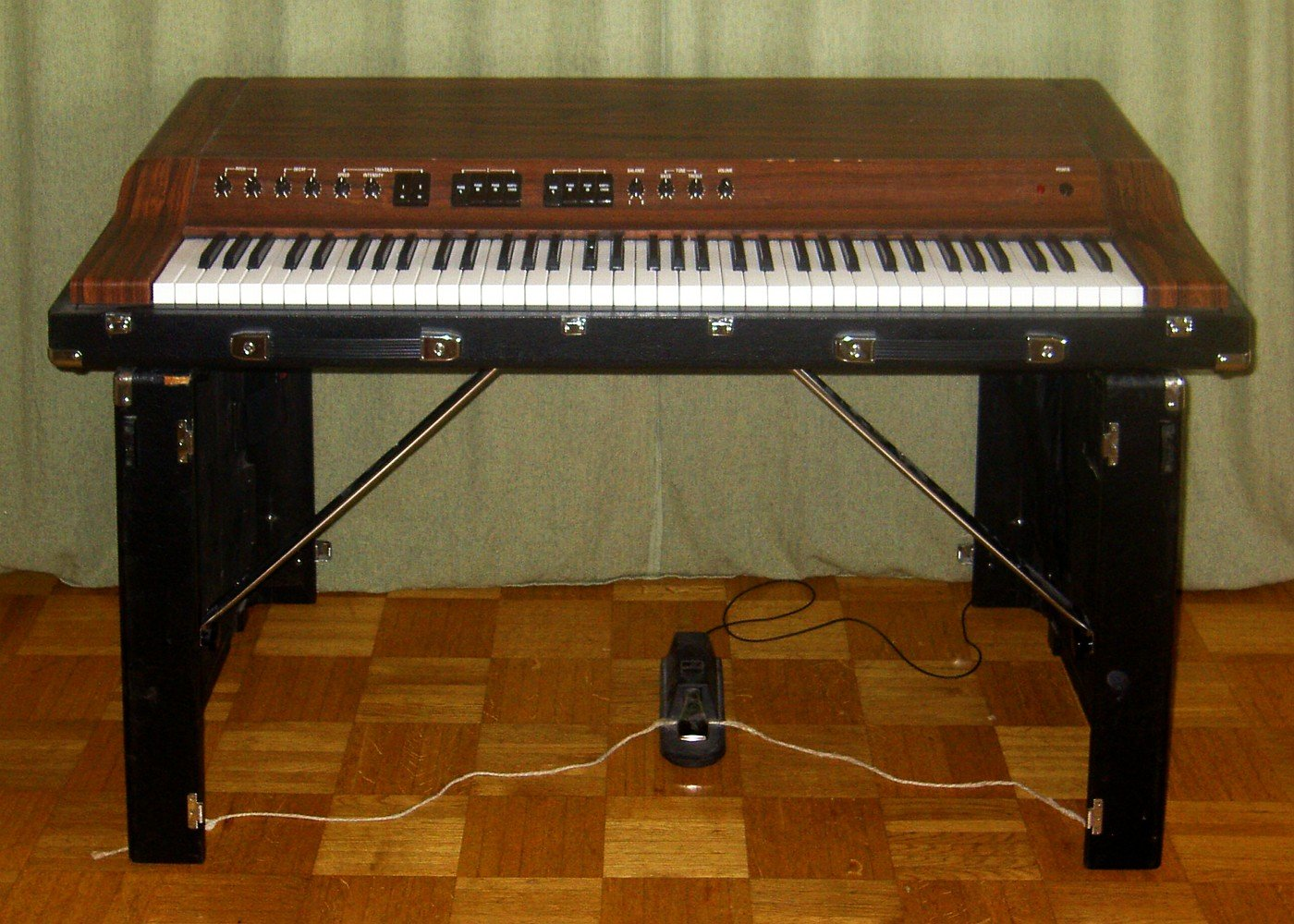
CP-30 (1976) analog electronic piano

CP series (analog)

- CP-7 (1982)
- CP-10 (1979)
- CP-20 (1977)
- CP-30 (1976)
- CP-11 / CP-11W (1981/1982)
- CP-25 (1981)
- CP-35 (1981)

===== Digital stage pianos =====
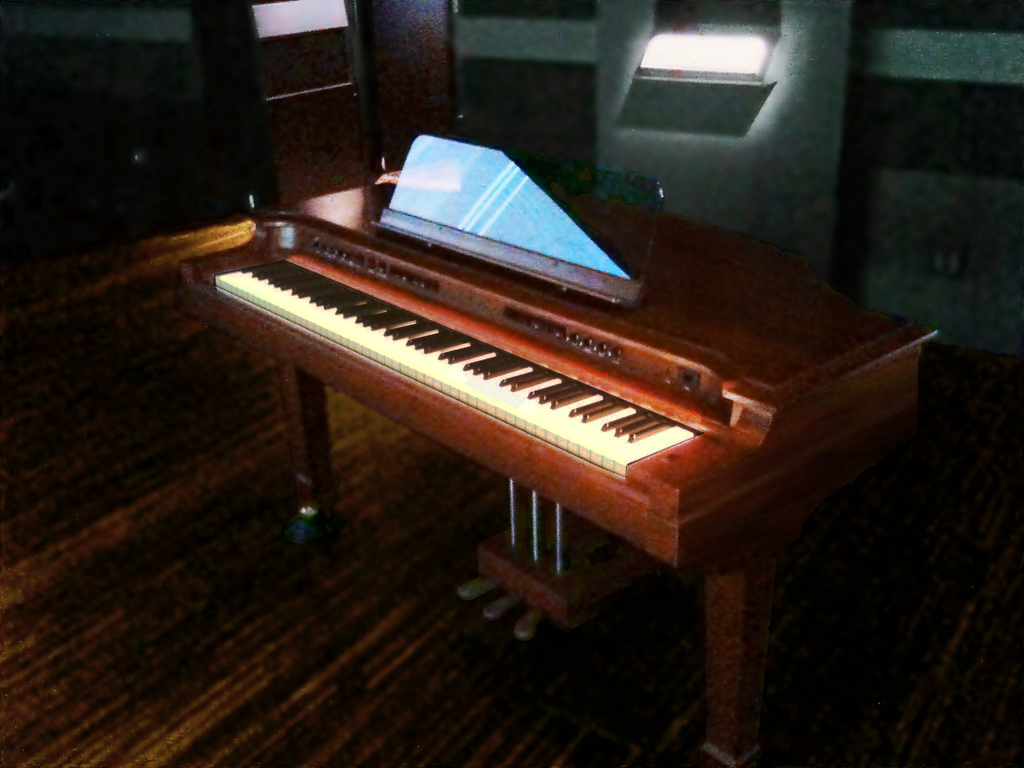
GS1 (1980) – 1st FM synth of Yamaha, released as Stage Piano

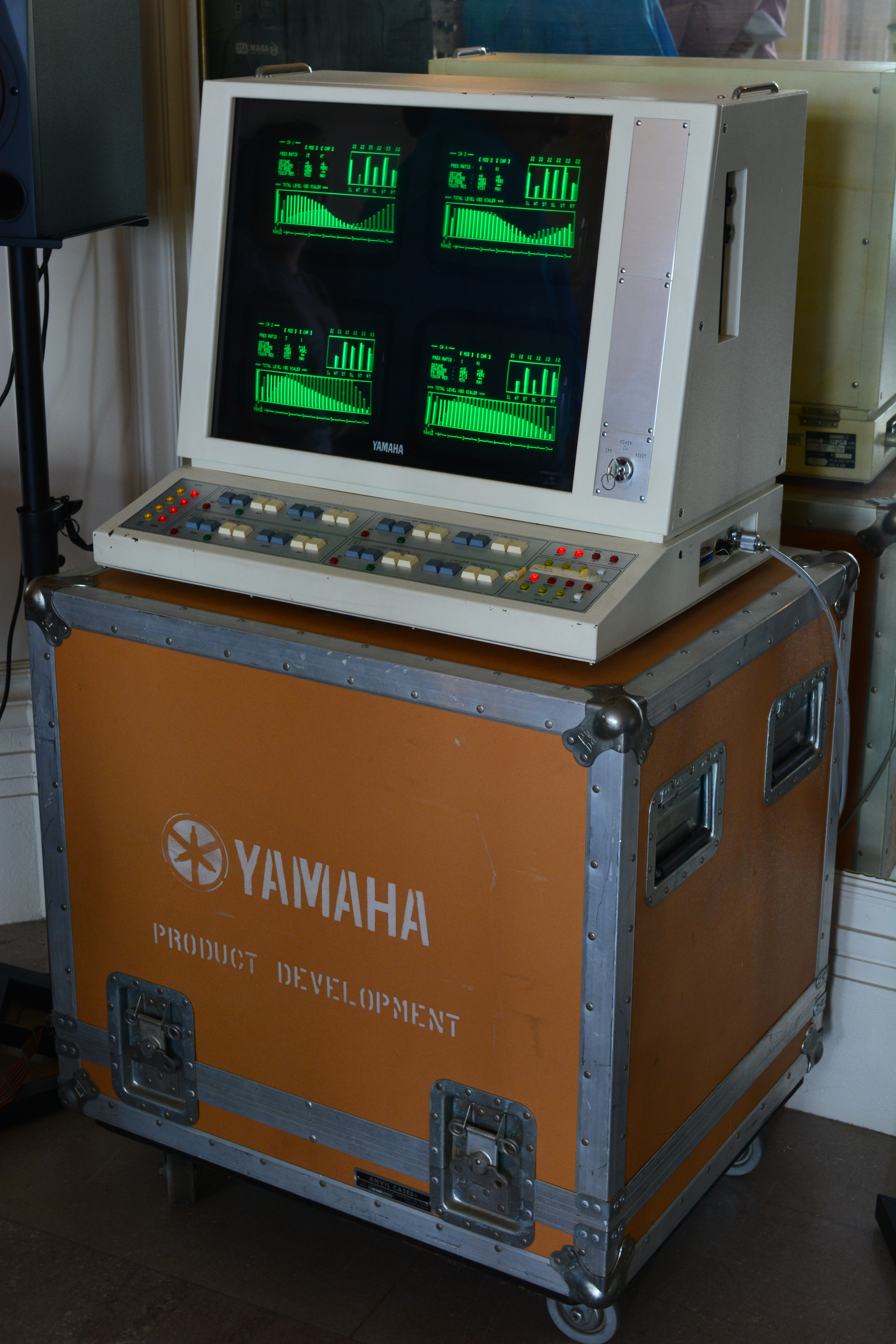
Programming Computer for GS1 (ca.1980)

- GS1 / GS2 (1980) — 1st FM synth of Yamaha.

CP series (digital)

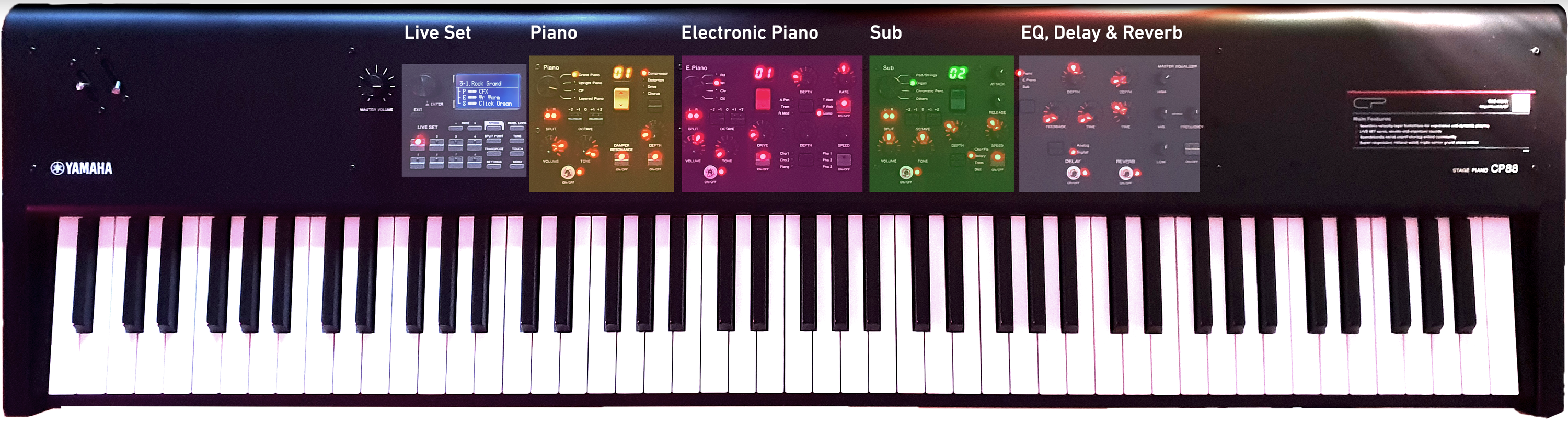
Yamaha CP88 stage piano took inspiration from Clavia Nord's one-to-one interface.

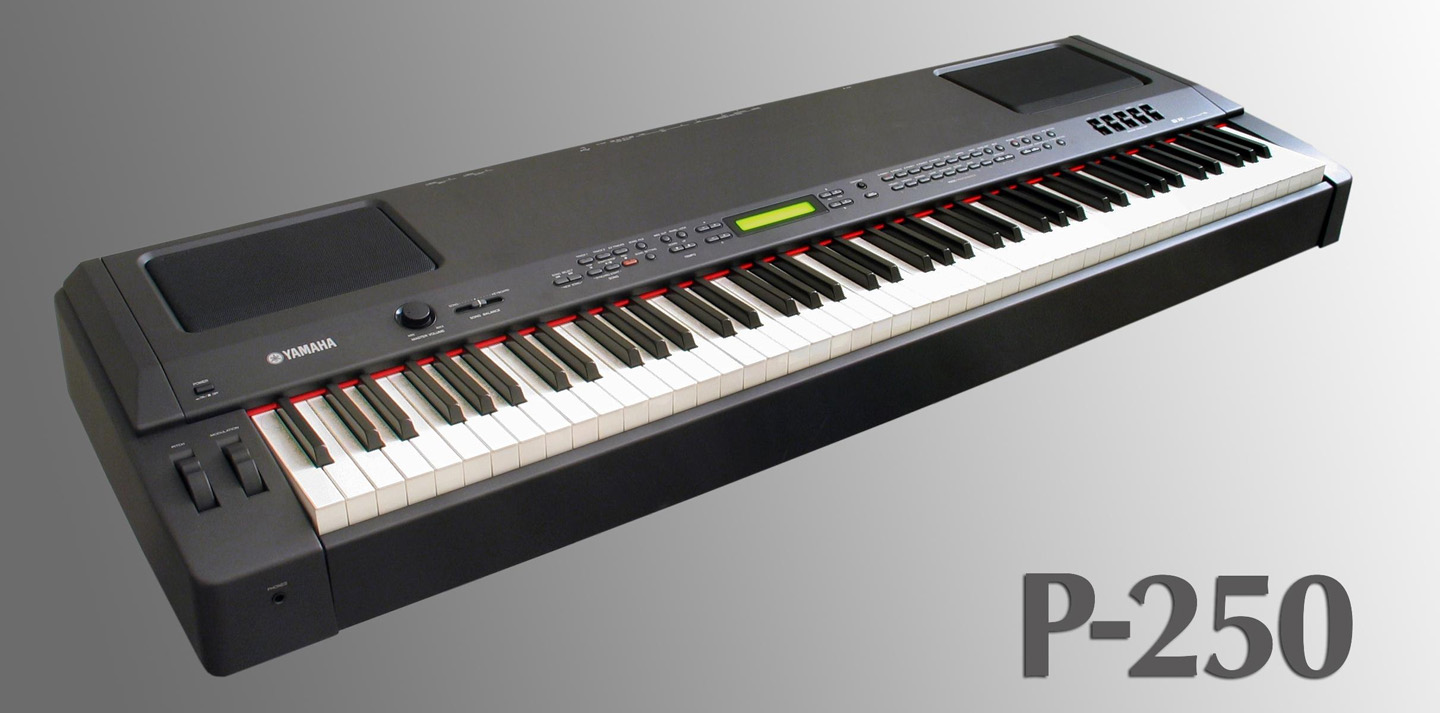
P-250

- CP1 (2009)
- CP4 (2014)
- CP5 (2010)
- CP33 (2006)
- CP40 (2014)
- CP50 (2010)
- CP73 (2019)
- CP88 (2019)
- CP300 (2006)

CK series

- CK61/CK88 (2023), Based on Reface YP, CP, CS, and DX in a full-sized format

Reface series

- Reface CP, Based on Yamaha CP80 (2015)
- Reface CS, Based on Yamaha CP-series analog synthesizer(2015)
- Reface YC, Based on Yamaha YC-45D and other organs (2015)
- Reface DX, Based on Yamaha DX7 FM Synthesizer (2015)

Clavinova PF series

- PF10 / PF12 / PF15 (1983)
- PF50 / PF60 (1986)
- PF70 / PF80 (1985)
- PF85 (1987)
- PF-500 (2002)
- PF-1000 (2002)
- PF1200 / PF1500 / PF2000 (1989)

==== Digital pianos ====
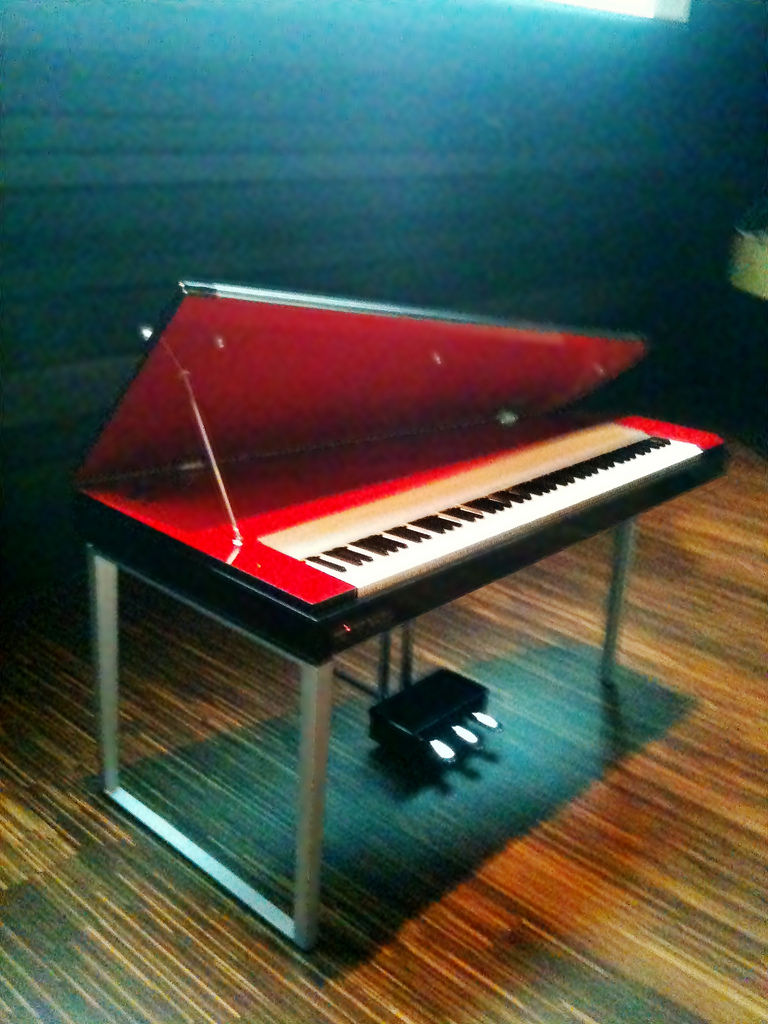
Modus H01

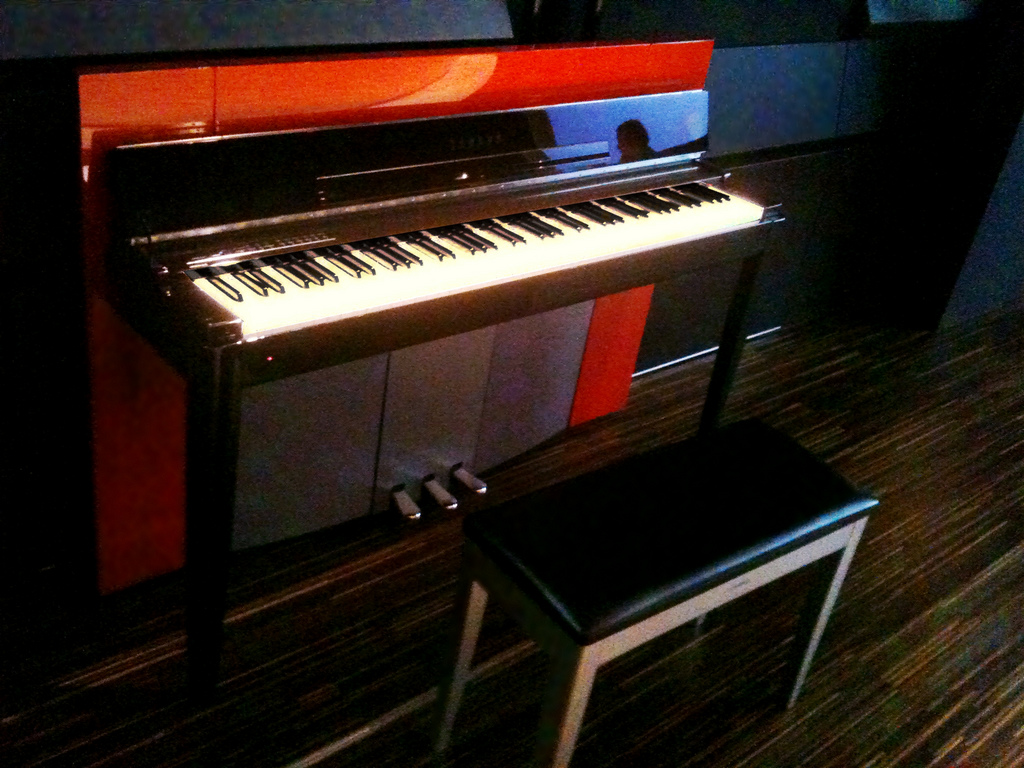
Modus F11

MODUS series

- Modus F01 (2007, 4colors:PB(blue)/PE(black)/PO(orange)/PR(red), similar to CLP-F01(2004))
- Modus F11 (2007, 4colors)
- Modus H01 (2006, 3colors:AG(yellow)/DB(black)/VR(red))
- Modus H11 (2009, 3colors)
- Modus R01 (2009, white)

===== Clavinova series =====
- YP-10 / YP-20 / YP-30 (1983), 1st generation
- YP-40 (1983, export model), 1st generation
- CWP-1 (2001)

Clavinova Grand (CGP/CVP-GP/CLP-GP)

- CGP-1000 (May 8, 2006)
- CVP-309GP (October 29, 2003)
- CVP-409GP (May 8, 2006)
- CLP-175 (2003, export model), predecessor of CLP-295GP
- CLP-265GP (2006)
- CLP-295GP (2006)

Clavinova Ensemble (CVP)

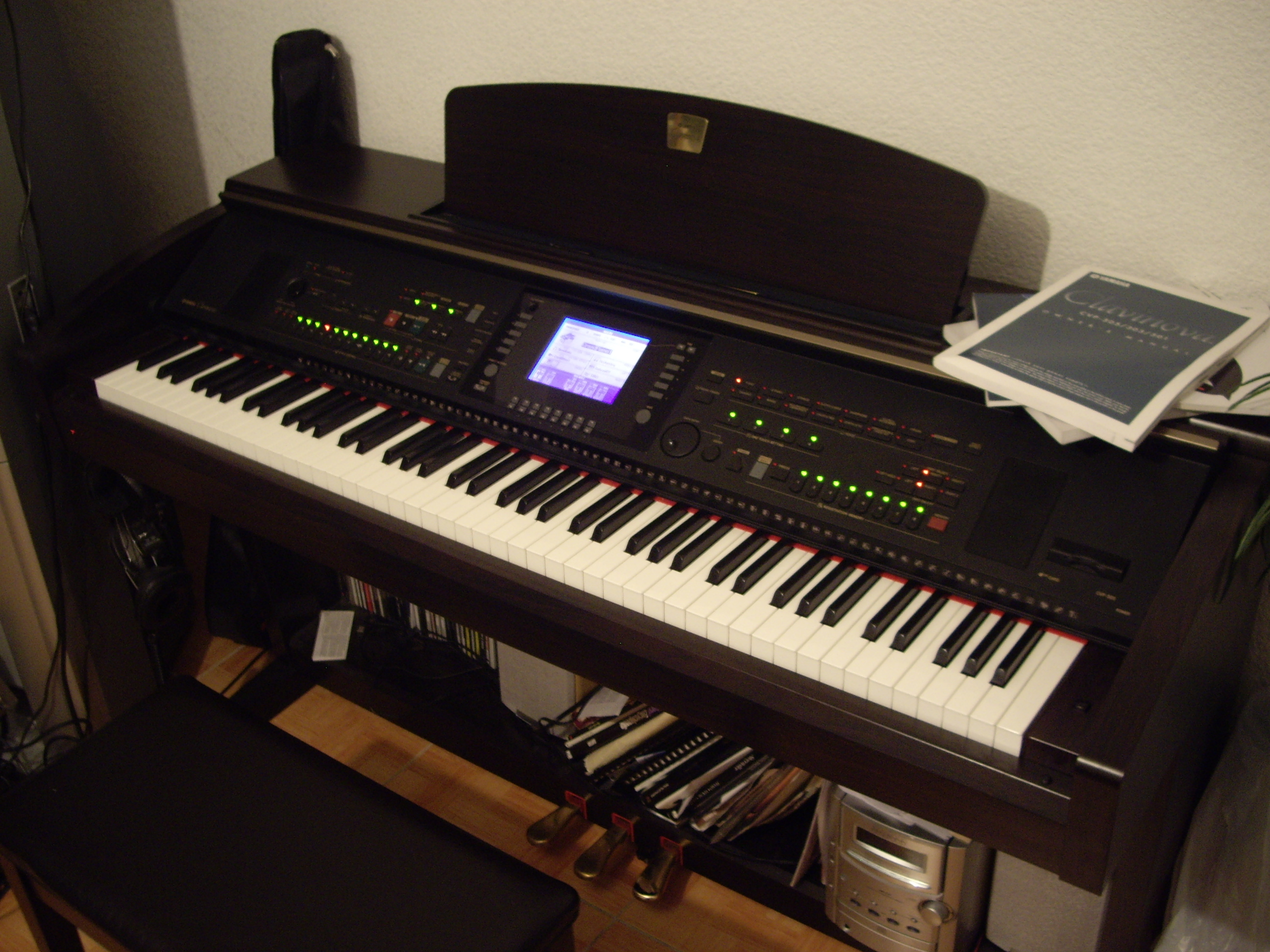
Clavinova CVP-303

(finishes: default = dark rosewood, C = cherry, M = mahogany, PE = polished ebony, PM = polished mahogany)

- CVP-3 / CVP-5 / CVP-7 (1985)
- CVP-6 / CVP-8 / CVP-10 / CVP-100MA / CVP-100PE (1987)
- CVP-20 (1988, export model)
- CVP-30 / CVP-50 / CVP-70 (1989)
- CVP-35 / CVP-45 / CVP-55 / CVP-65 / CVP-75 (1991)
- CVP-25 (1993, export model)
- CVP-83 / CVP-85 / CVP-87 (1993)
- CVP-85A
- CVP-83S[White] / CVP-87A[White]
- CVP-89 (1994, export model)
- CVP-49 (1995, export model)
- CVP-59[S] / CVP-69 / CVP-79 (1995)
- CVP-79A
- CVP-92 / CVP-94 / CVP-96 / CVP-98 (February 18, 1997)
- CVP-600 (February 18, 1997)
- CVP-103 [M] / CVP-105 / CVP-107 / CVP-109 (March 1, 1999)
- CVP-700 (March 1, 1999, export model)
- CVP-201 (March 1, 2001)
- CVP-203 / CVP-205 / CVP-207 / CVP-209 (June 25, 2001)
- CVP-900 (May 27, 2002, export model)
- CVP-202 (November 1, 2002)
- CVP-204 [C] / CVP-206 [M] (September 10, 2002)
- CVP-208 [M] / CVP-210 (September 10, 2002, export model)
- CVP-301 (October 29, 2003, export model)
- CVP-303 [C] / CVP-305 [C] / CVP-307 / CVP-309 [PE][PM] (October 29, 2003)
- CVP-401 [C][PE] / CVP-403 [C][PE][PM] / CVP-405 [PE][PM] / CVP-407 / CVP-409 [PE][PM] (May 8, 2006)
- CVP-501 / CVP-503 / CVP-505 [PE] / CVP-509 [PE][PM] (February 5, 2009)
- CVP-601 / CVP-605 / CVP-609 / CVP-609GP (July 13, 2012)
- CVP-701 / CVP-705 / CVP-709 / CVP-709GP (June 17, 2015)
- CVP-805 / CVP-809 / CVP-809GP (May 1, 2019)
- CVP-905 / CVP-909 / CVP-909GP (April 13, 2023)

Clavinova Traditional (CLP)

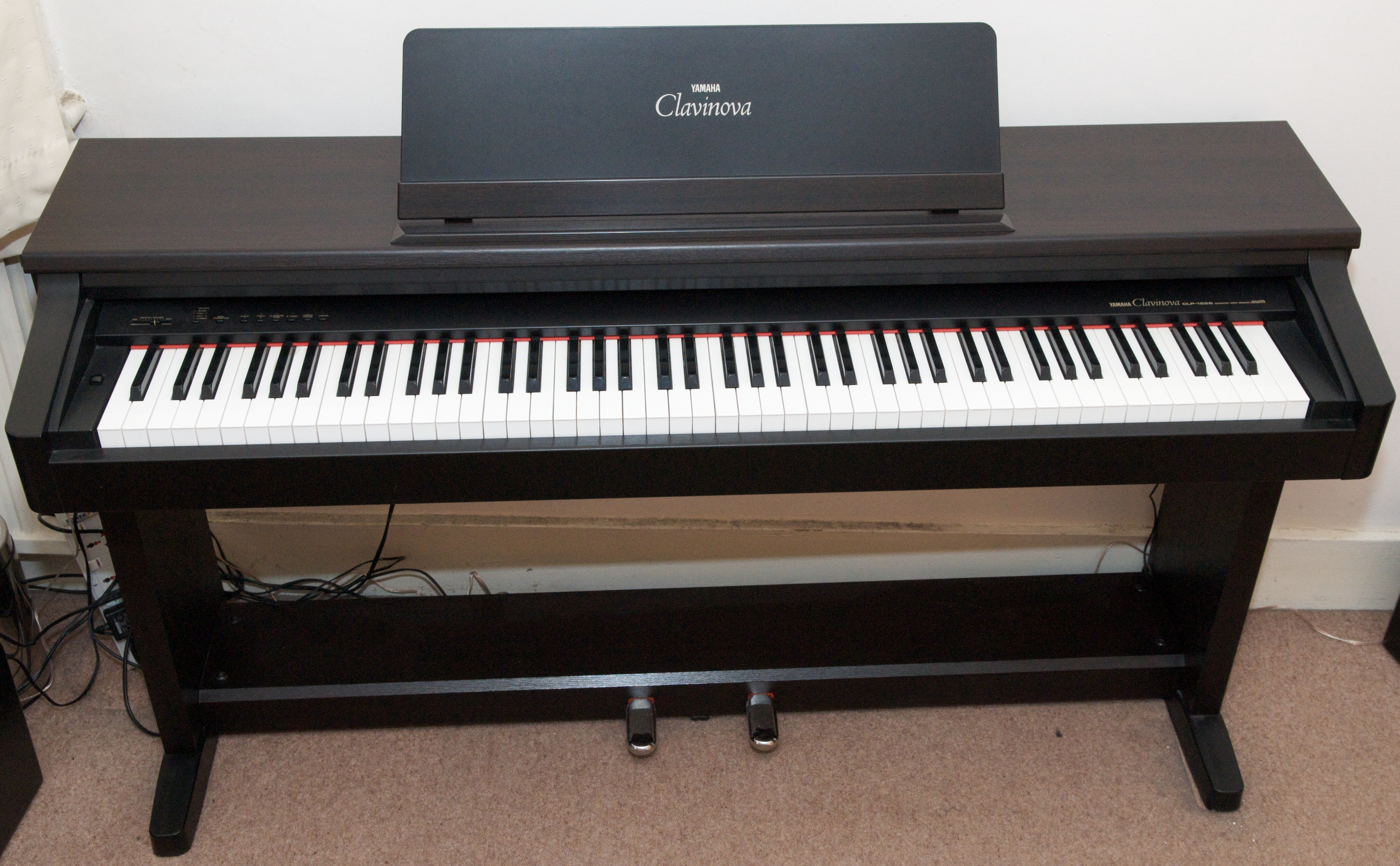
Clavinova CLP-122S (1992)

(finishes: default = dark rosewood, C = cherry, M = mahogany, PE = polished ebony, PM = polished mahogany)

- CLP-20 / CLP-30 (1985)
- CLP-40 / CLP-45 / CLP-50 / CLP-55 / CLP-200 / CLP-300 (1986)
- CLP-100 / CLP-500 (1987)
- CLP-250 / CLP-350 / CLP-550 / CLP-650 (1988)
- CLP-570 / CLP-670 (1989)
- CLP-260 / CLP-360 / CLP-560 / CLP-760 (1990)
- CLP-121 / CLP-122 / CLP-123 / CLP-124 (1992)
- CLP-133 / CLP-134 / CLP-705 (1993)
- CLP-152S / CLP-153S / CLP-153SG / CLP-154S / CLP-155 / CLP-157 (1994)
- CLP-311 / CLP-611 / CLP-811 (1996, export model)
- CLP-411 / CLP-511 / CLP-711 / CLP-911 (1996)
- CLP-555 (1997, AE action, grand piano style)
- CLP-810S (1998, export model)
- CLP-820 / CLP-840 / CLP-860[M] / CLP-870 / CLP-880[M][PE] (1998)
- CLP-920 / CLP-930 / CLP-950[C][M] / CLP-970[C][M] (2000)
- CLP-955 / CLP-970A[C][M] (2000, export model)
- CLP-910 / CLP-990[M] (2001, export model)
- CLP-110 (2002, export model)
- CLP-120[C] / CLP-130 / CLP-150[C][M] / CLP-170[C][M][PE] (2002/2003(PE))
- CLP-115 (2003, export model)
- CLP-175 (2003, Clavinova Grand, export model)
- CLP-220[PE] (2005/2006)
- CLP-230[C][M][PE] / CLP-240[C][M][PE] / CLP-270[C][M] / CLP-280[C][PE][PM] (2005/2006)
- CLP-320[C][M] / SCLP-320 / CLP-330[C][M][PE] / CLP-340[C][M][PE] / CLP-370[C][M][PE] / CLP-380[PE][PM] (2008)
- CLP-430 / CLP-440 / CLP-470 / CLP-480 (2011?)
- CLP-525 / CLP-535 / CLP-545 / CLP-565GP / CLP-575 / CLP-585 (2014)
- CLP-625 / CLP-635 / CLP-645 / CLP-665GP / CLP-675 / CLP-685 (2017)
- CLP-725 / CLP-735 / CLP-745 / CLP-765GP / CLP-775 / CLP-785 / CLP-795GP (2020)
- CLP-825 / CLP-835 / CLP-845 / CLP-865GP / CLP-875 / CLP-885 / CLP-895GP (2024)

CLP-S series (spinet style similar to Modus F01/F11)

- Clavinova 610
- CLP-F01 (2004, 4colors: PB(blue)/PE(black)/PO(orange)/PR(red))
- CLP-S306[PE] / CLP-S308[PE] (2008)
- CLP-S406 / CLP-S408 (2011?)

Clavinova Smart Piano (CSP)
(finishes: B = Black Walnut, W = Satin White, PE = Polished Ebony, PW = Polished White)

- CSP-150 [B][W][PE] (April 21, 2017)
- CSP-170 [B][W][PE] (April 21, 2017)
- CSP-255 [B][W][PE] (December, 2023)
- CSP-275 [B][W][PE] (December, 2023)
- CSP-295 [B][PE][PW] (December, 2023)
- CSP-295GP [PE][PW] (December, 2023)

===== P-series (stands for "portable") =====
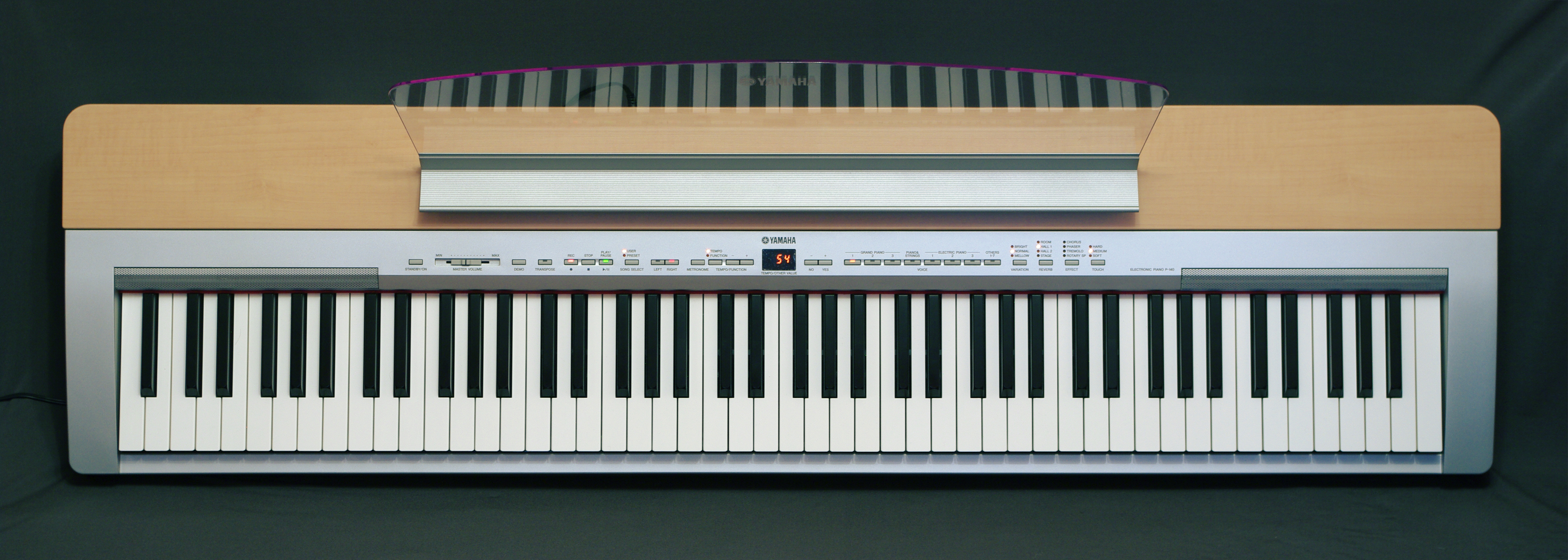
P-140S

(colors: B = Black & Ebony, S = Silver & Cherry, W = White)

- P-35 (2012, GHS action)
- P-45 (2015, GHS action)
- P50m (1996, half rack)
- P-60[S] (2002, GH action)
- P-65 (2006, export model, GHS action)
- P-70[S] (2005 or 2006, GHS action))
- P-80[W] (1999/2001, GH action)
- P-85[S](2007, GHS action)
- P-90 (2003, GH action)
- P-95[S] (2010, GHS action)
- P-100 (1992, AE action) Clavinova PF series,
- P-105 (2012, GHS action)
- P-115 (2015, GHS action)
- P-120[S] (2001, GH action)
- P-121[S] (2018, GHS action)
- P-125 (2018, GHS action)
- P-140[S] (2005 or 2006, GH action)
- P-145 (2023, GHC action)
- P-150 (1995, AE2 action)
- P-155[S] (2009, S = silver)
- P-500 Clavinova Digital
- P-155[B][S] (2009, GH action)
- P-200 (1998, GH action)
- P-225 (2023, GHC action)
- P-250 (2003, GH action)
- P-255 (2014, GH action)
- P-300 (1994, AE action) P500 features in P-100 chessis,
- P-500 (AE action)
- P-515 (2018, NWX action)
- P-S500 (2022, GHS action)
- P-525 (2024, GT-S action)

===== ARIUS/YDP series =====
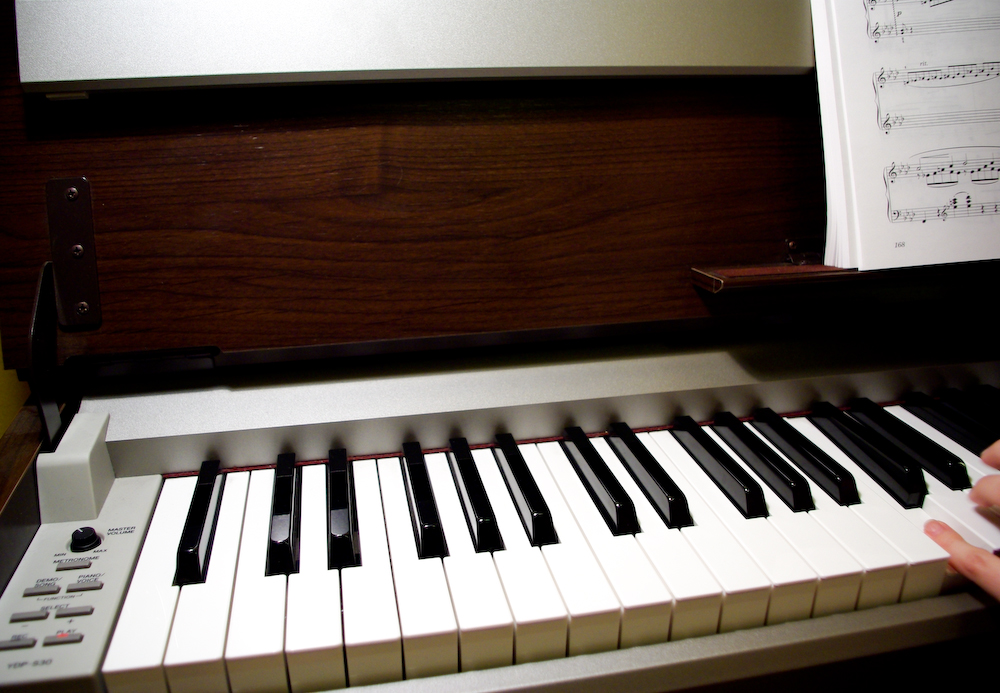
YDP-S30 (left side)

(finishes: C = bright wood color)

- YDP-S30[C] / YDP-S31[C] (2007/2009)
- YDP-88 / YDP-88II (1995/1997)
- YDP-101 / YDP-201 (1999)
- YDP-103 (2016)
- YDP-113 (2002, export model)
- YDP-121 (2001)
- YDP-123 / YDP-223[C] (2002)
- YDP-131[C] (2005)
- YDP-140[C] / YDP-160[C] (2008)
- YDP-141[C] / YDP-161[C][B] / YDP-181 / YDP-V240 (2010/2011(YDP-161B))
- YDP-142 (2014, GHS) / YDP-162 (2014, GH)
- YDP-143 [R][B] (2016, GHS) / YDP-163 (2016, GH)
- YDP-144 (2019, GHS)/ YDP-164 (2019, GH3)
- YDP-145 (2022, GHS)/ YDP-165 (2022, GH3)
- YDP-S52 (2021, GHS)
- YDP-S34 (2019, GHS)/ YDP-S54 (2019, GH3) (2019)
- YDP-151[C] / YDP-J151 (2005 or 2006/2006)
- YDP-184 (2018, not sold in EU)
- YDP-200 (1996)
- YDP-213 (2005, export model)
- YDP-223 (2002, export model)
- YDP-300 (1995)
- YDP-321 (2000)
- YDP-323 (2005, export model)
- YDP-146 (R/B/WH) (2026)
- YDP-166 (R/B/WB/WH) (2026)
- YDP-S36 (B/WB/WH) (2026)
- YDP-S56 (B/WH) (2026)

YPP series

- YPP-15 / YPP-33 (1991)
- YPP-35 (1991, export model)
- YPP-45
- YPP-50
- YPP-55 (1992)
- YPP-100 (2002)
- YPP-200 (2001, export model)

YPR series

- YPR-6 / YPR-8 (1985)
- YPR-7 / YPR-9 (1986)
- YPR-20 / YPR-30 (1990)
- YPR-50 (1999)

YPT series (this Series are Similar to The PSR 'E' Series. Only that it is A White Variation)

- YPT-200 (2005)
- YPT-210 (2007, export model)

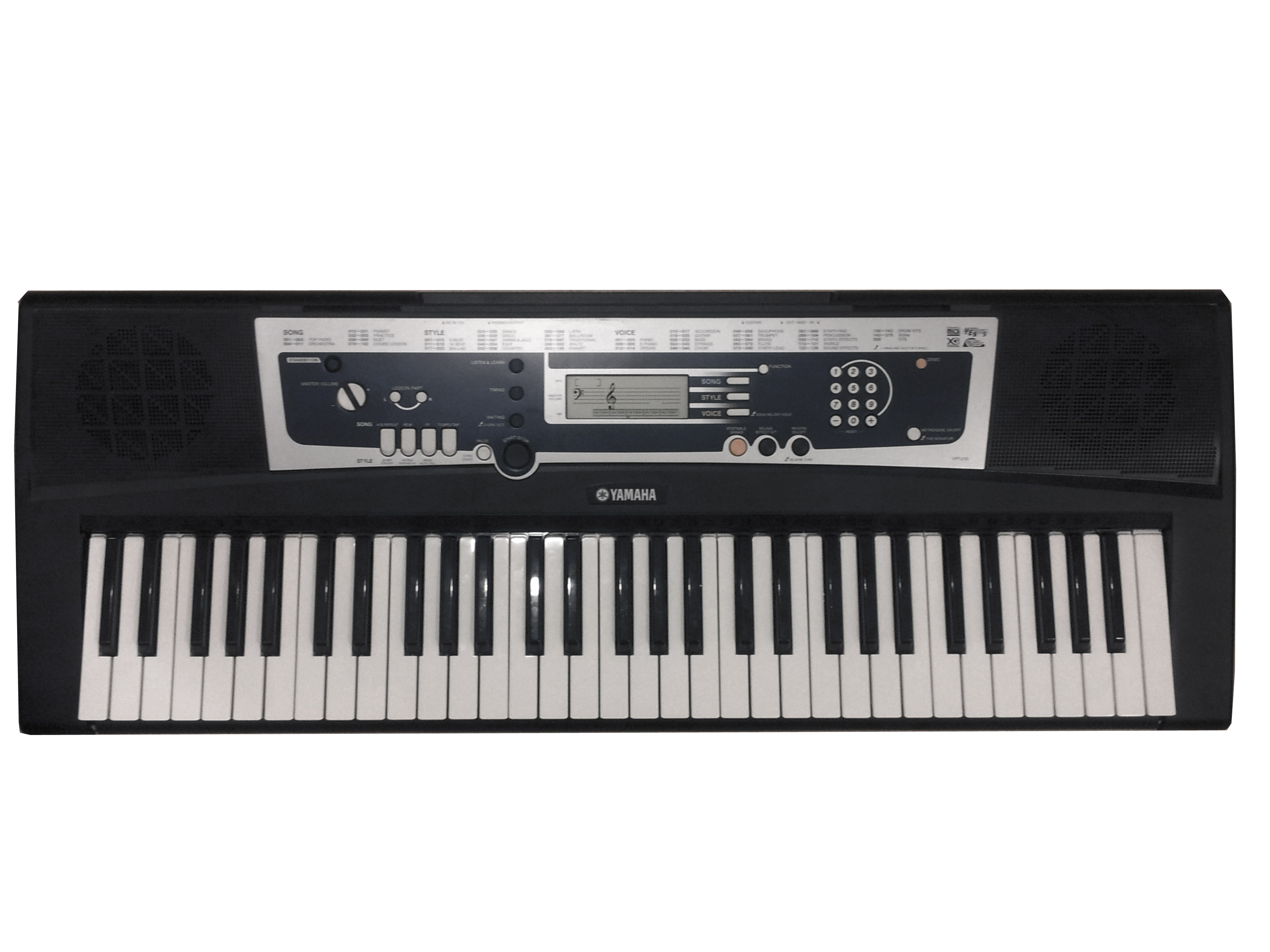
Yamaha YPT-210

- YPT-210AD / YPT-210DI / YPT-210MS / YPT-210MSB

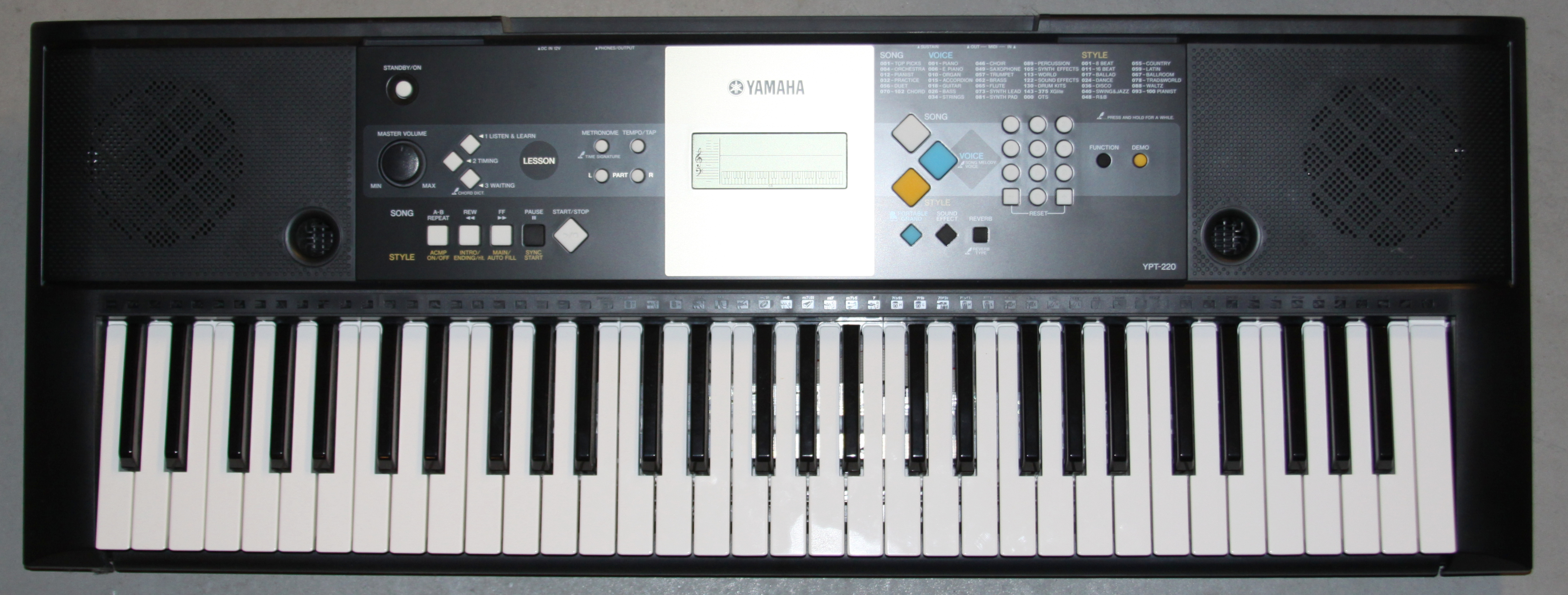
Yamaha YPT-220

- YPT-220 (2009, export model)
- YPT-230 (2011, export model)
- YPT-240 (2013)
- YPT-255 (2015)
- YPT-260 (2017)
- YPT-270 (2020)
- YPT-280 (2024)
- YPT-300 (2005)
- YPT-310 (2007, export model)
- YPT-310AD / YPT-310MS / YPT-310MSB
- YPT-320 (2009, export model)
- YPT-330 (2011, export model)
- YPT-340 (2013)
- YPT-360 (2017)
- YPT-370 (2020)
- YPT-380 / YPT-W320 (2024)
- YPT-400 (2005, export model)
- YPT-410 (2007, export model)
- YPT-420 (2009, export model)

===== J-series Digital Pianos =====
- J-3000 (1998)
- J-5000 (2000)
- J-7000 (2002)
- J-8000 (2005/2006)
- J-9000 (2008)

===== Piaggero/NP series portable digital piano =====
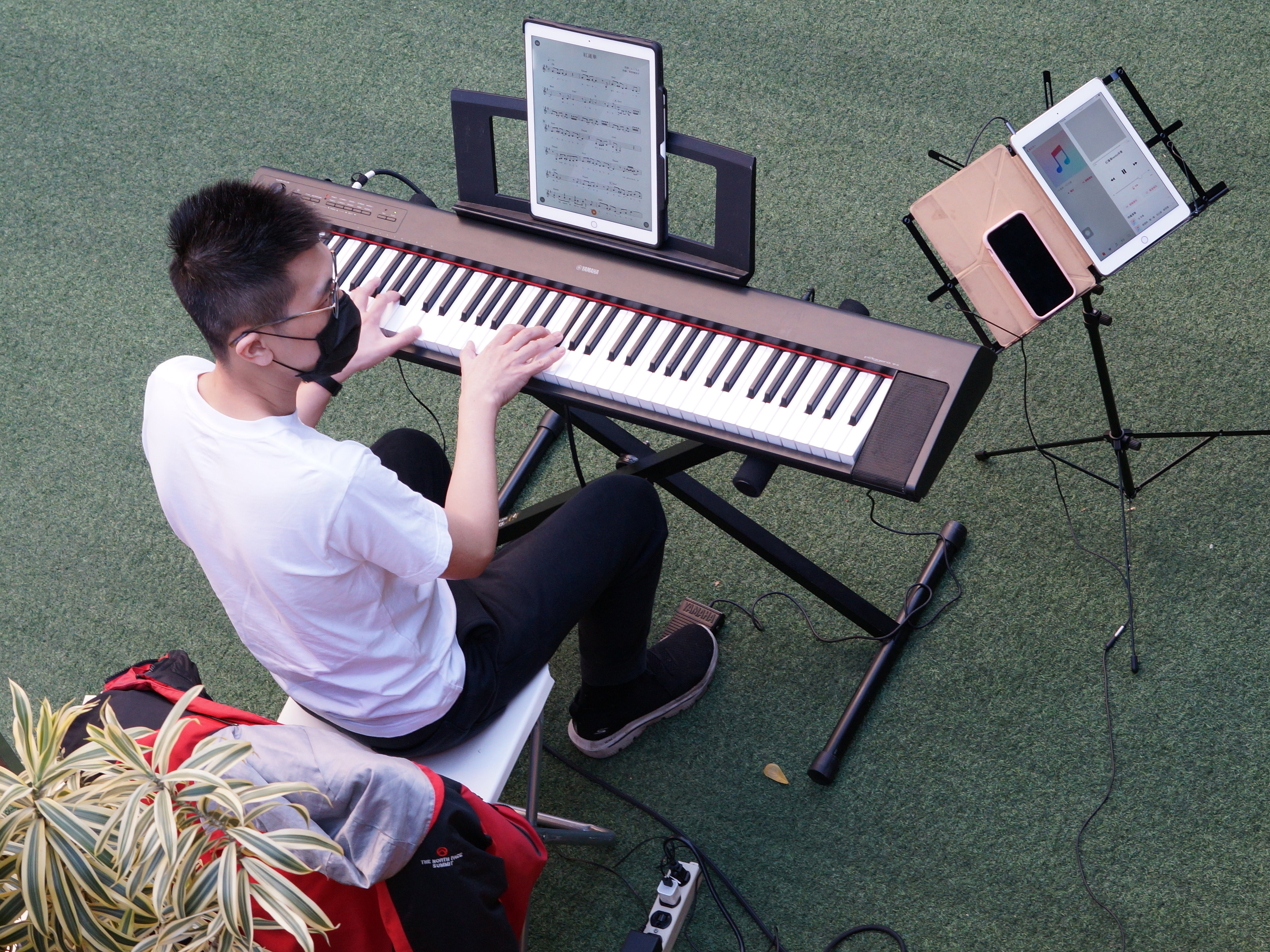
Piaggero NP series played

- NP-11
- NP-12 (2016)
- NP-15 (August 27, 2023)
- NP-30 / NP-30S (2007, S = silver)
- NP-31
- NP-32 (2016)
- NP-35 (August 27, 2023)
- NP-V60 / NP-V80 (May 1st, 2009)

===== Portable Grand DGX / YPG series =====
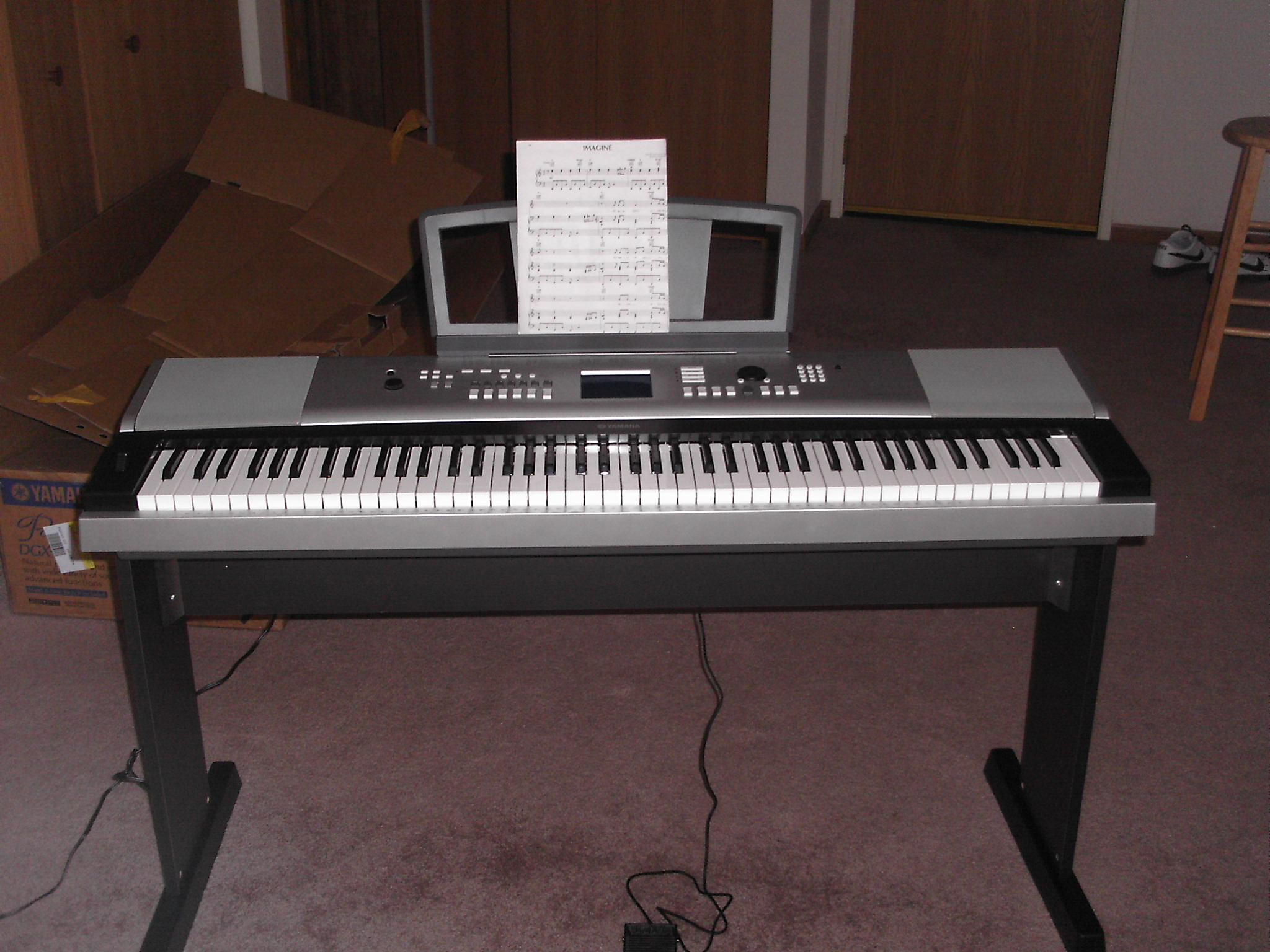
DGX-620

(color: DGX = Silver, Black or White; YPG = Champagne Gold)

- DGX-200 (25 January 2002)
- DGX-202 (25 January 2002, export model)
- DGX-203 (27 January 2004, export model)
- DGX-205 (27 January 2004, export model)
- DGX-220 / YPG-225 (2006)
- DGX-230 / YPG-235 (2008) (76 keys with long production run replaced by PSR-EW300)
- DGX-300 (12 March 2002)
- DGX-305 (2004, export model)
- DGX-500 (12 March 2002)
- DGX-505 (2004, export model)
- DGX-520 / YPG-525 (2006), USB to device replaces Smartmedia with USB Stick, Rectangular Styling, Lyrics and Score Display
- DGX-530 / YPG-535 (2008) (88 keys, usb to device, 10 more rhythms)
- DGX-620 / YPG-625 (2006) (88 graded hammer keys 32 voices, usb to device, large lyric score display, replaced by YPG-635)
- DGX-630 [B][BP][P] / YPG-635 (2008) (88 graded hammer keys 130 voices, 32 registrations)
- DGX-640 (18 March 2010), Restyled flat front round corners, front facing USB slot
- DGX-650 (5 February 2013), 128 polyphony, 100 songs, 3 pedals, aux in, USB audio recorder
- DGX-660 (2016) mic input
- DGX-670 (2021) color display, Super Articulation voices, Virtual Resonance Modeling, enhanced style section, Bluetooth audio

Entertainment Series

- PSR-K1 (February 6, 2003)

Others

- N-100 (2006, with Graded Hammer Effect, weighted-action KB)
- PDP400
- PSR-GX76 (2000, export model, with Portable Grand)
- Primary-01 (2026, Yamaha Music School keyboards based on PSR-E483 but with removed DSP (DSP effect only soldered in onboard voice) and arpeggio)

=== Organs ===
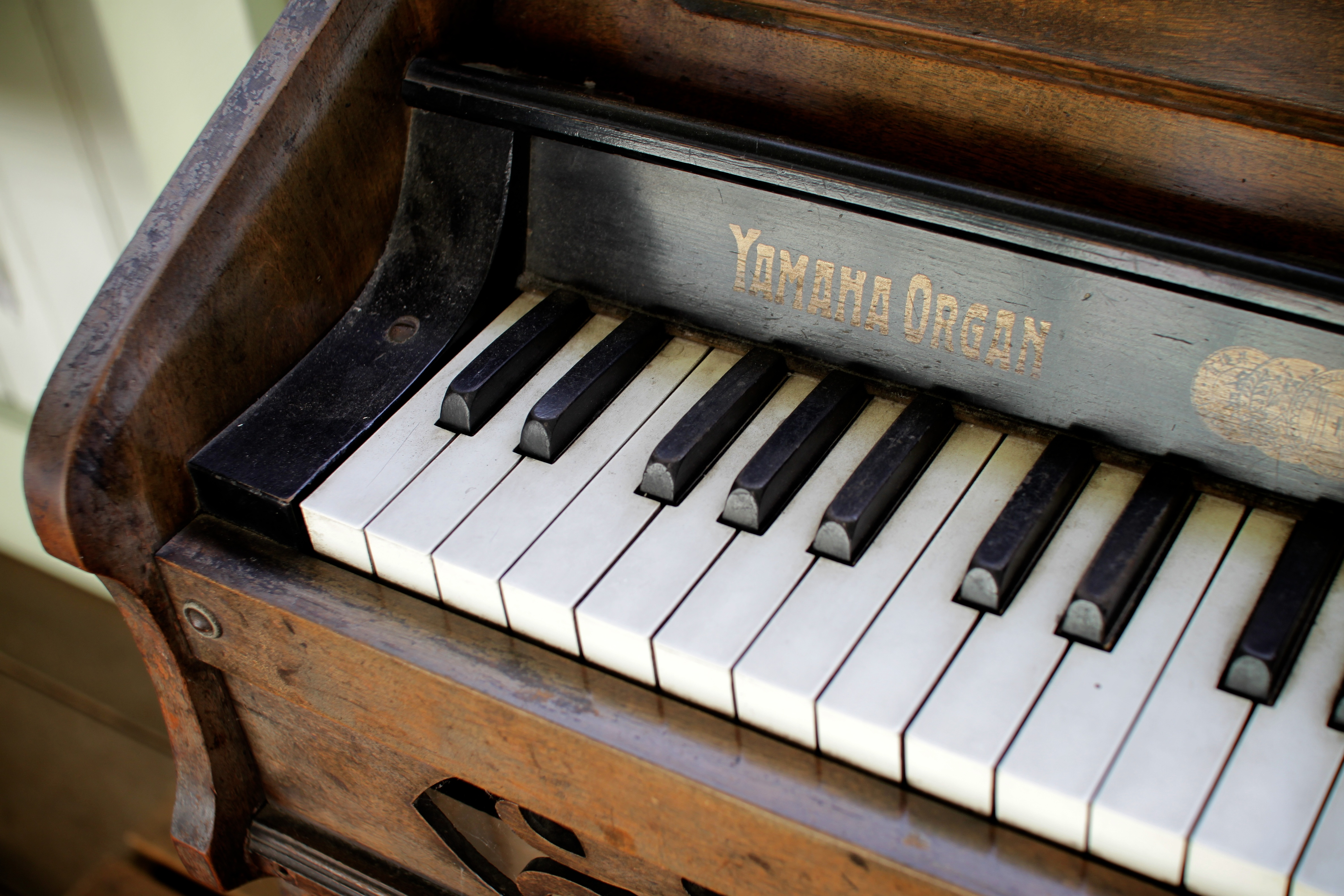
Yamaha organ (1888–)

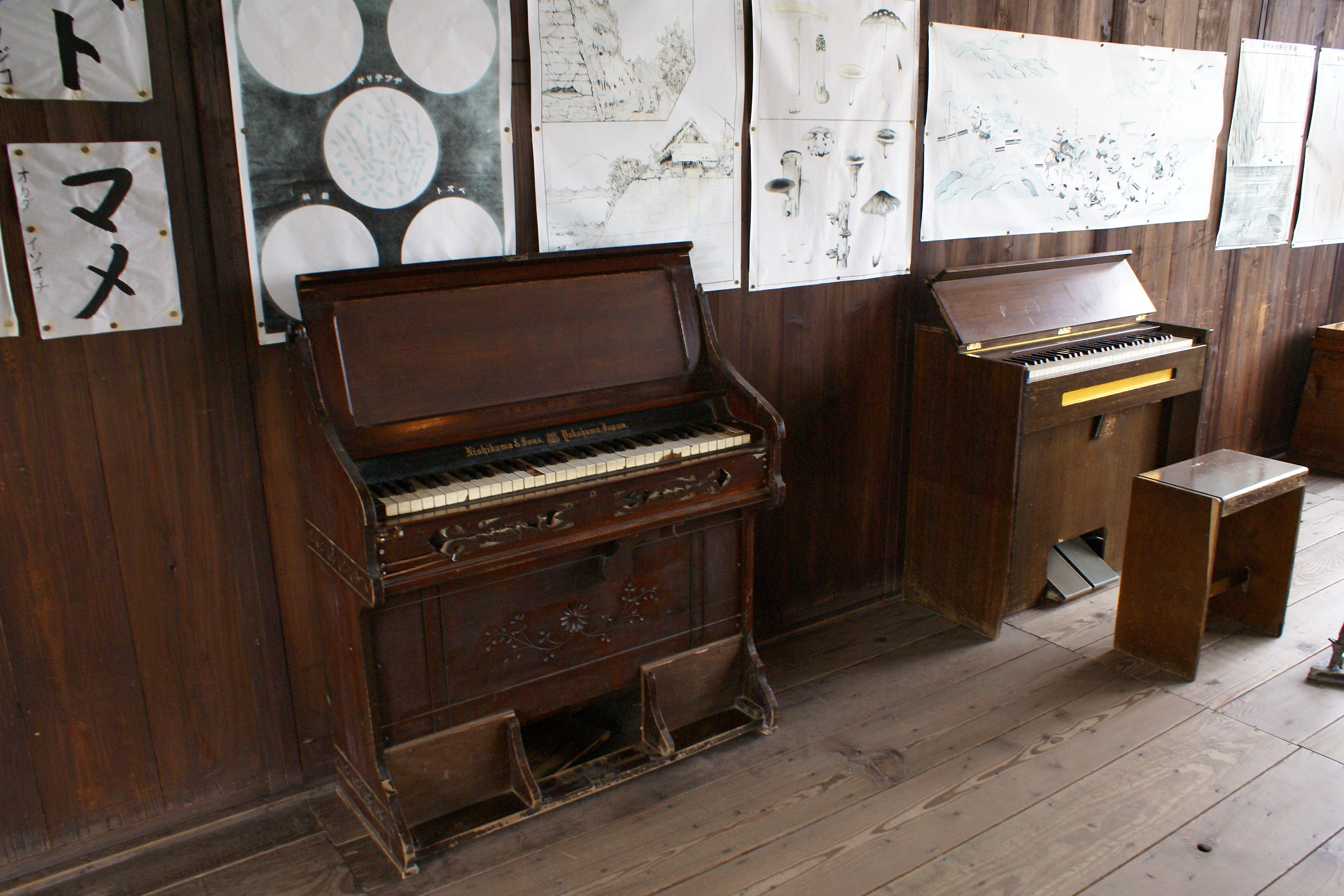
Nishikawa organ (left, 1884–c. 1936)

==== Pump organs ====
In 1888, Yamaha started to manufacture their pump organs in the form of reed organs.

In 1921, Yamaha acquired Nishikawa & Sons in Yokohama after the death of its founder, and continued to manufacture Nishikawa organs and pianos until 1936.

==== Magna organ (1934) ====
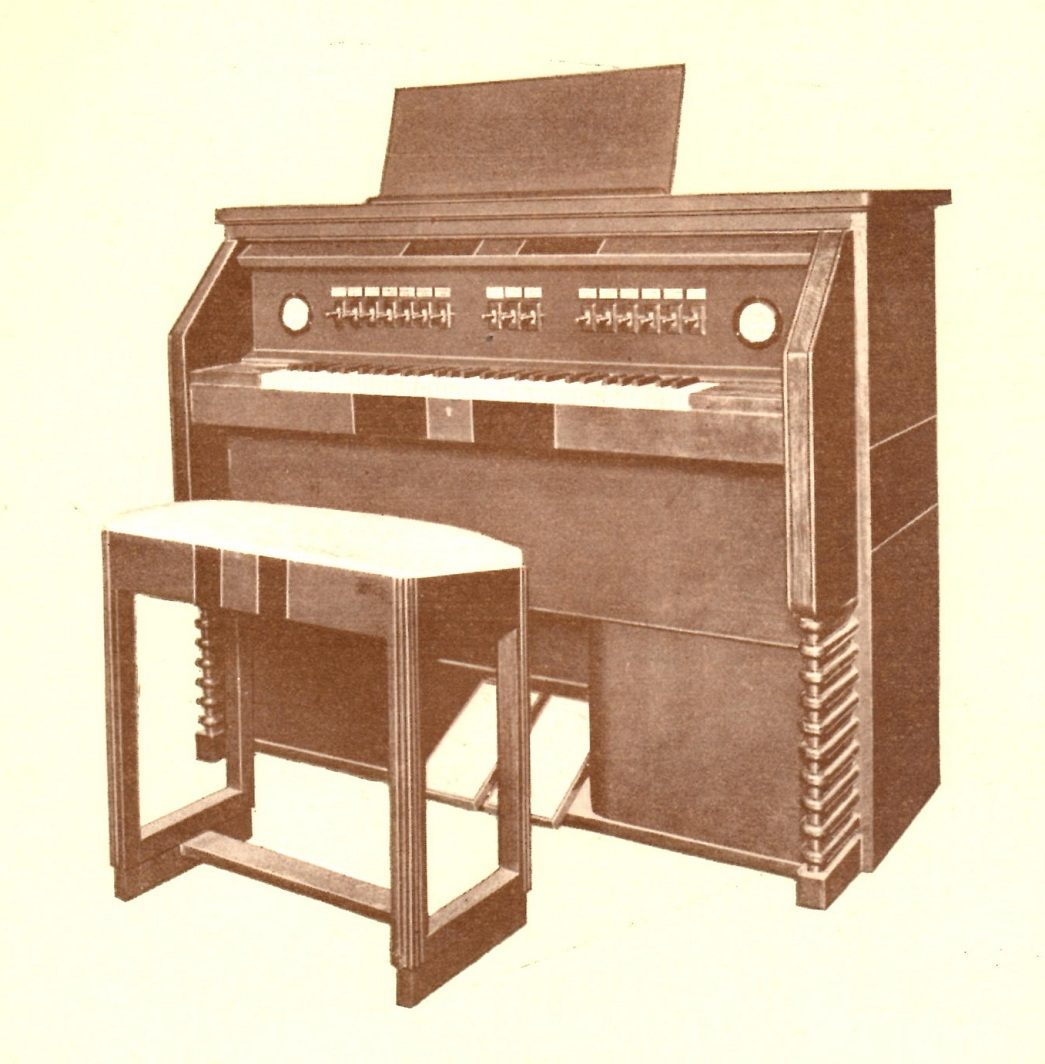
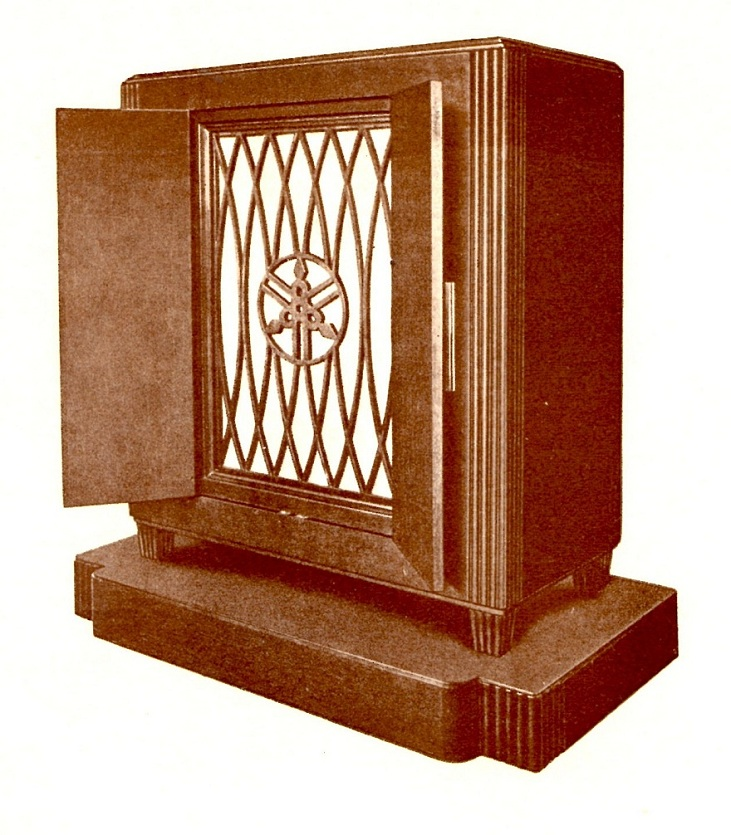
Yamaha Magna Organ & Tone Cabinet (1935)

Magna Organ introduced in 1935, was a multi-timbral keyboard instrument invented in 1934 by a Yamaha engineer, Sei-ichi Yamashita. It was a kind of electro-acoustic instrument, an acoustic instrument with additional electronic circuits for sound modification. The Magna Organ was an electric-fan driven free reed organ with the microphone sealed in a soundproof box, instead of the electrostatic pickups used on electrostatic reed organs. (Note: Electrostatic reed organ was developed by Frederick Albert Hoschke in 1934, then manufactured by Everett and Wurlitzer until 1961) Early designs of the Magna Organ were a type of additive-synthesizer that summed-up the partials generated by the frequency-multipliers. However, it was difficult to achieve polyphony without intermodulation distortions with the technology of the 1930s. According to the additional patents and the reviews at that time, its later design as finally implemented, seems to have shifted to the sound-colorization system using the combinations of sets of free reeds, microphones and loudspeakers.

Similar types of instruments using the pairs of free reeds and microphones sealed in double-soundproof boxes, were later re-commercialized as Croda Organs in 1959 by Tōyō Denshi Gakki Kenkyūjo (In English: Tōyō Electronic Musical Instrument Laboratory) in Tokyo.

==== Electronic organs ====
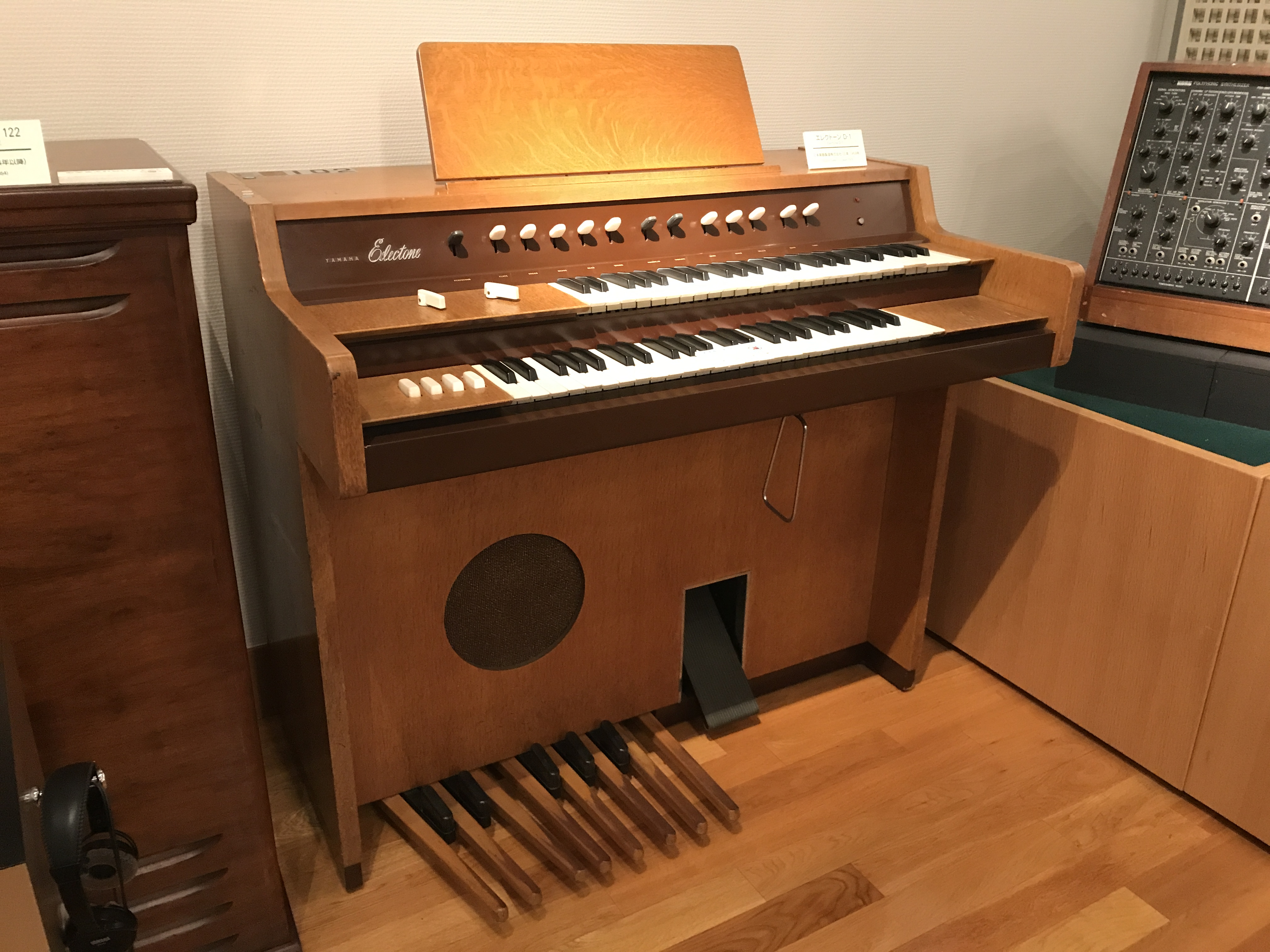
Yamaha D-1 (1959)

The most models and years of introductions are based on official chronicle. Also, the photograph of major models on each era is available on the 50th anniversary site.

Prototype Electone

- E-T (1958, prototype concept model)
- ET-5 (May 1959, Improved version of E-T Prototype)
- EM-6 (May 1959, Single-stage keyboard prototype)

1st Electone

- D-1 (1959–1962, electronic organ products)

Stage models

Yamaha Electone Stage models

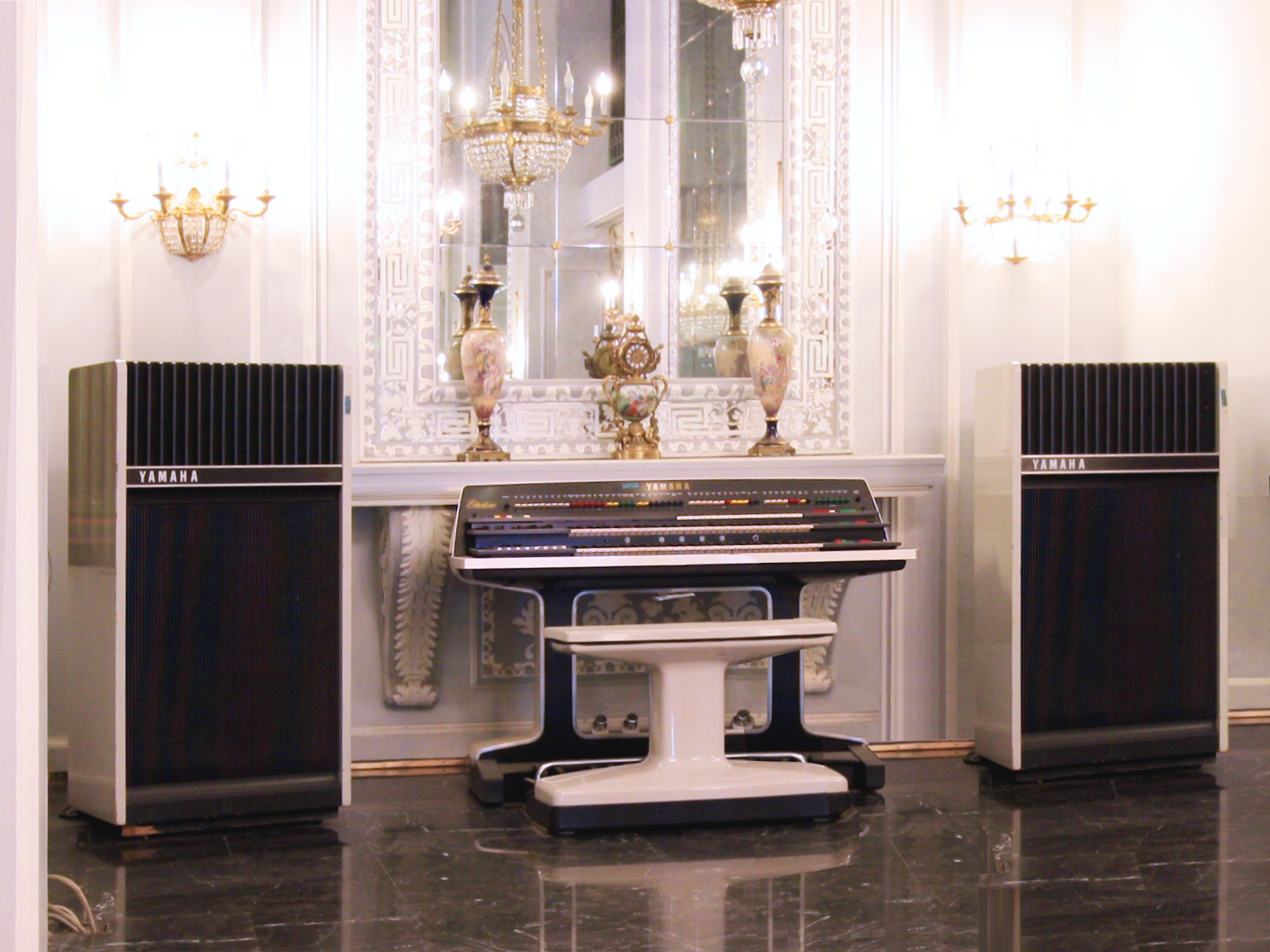
Yamaha EX-42 (1970–1977)

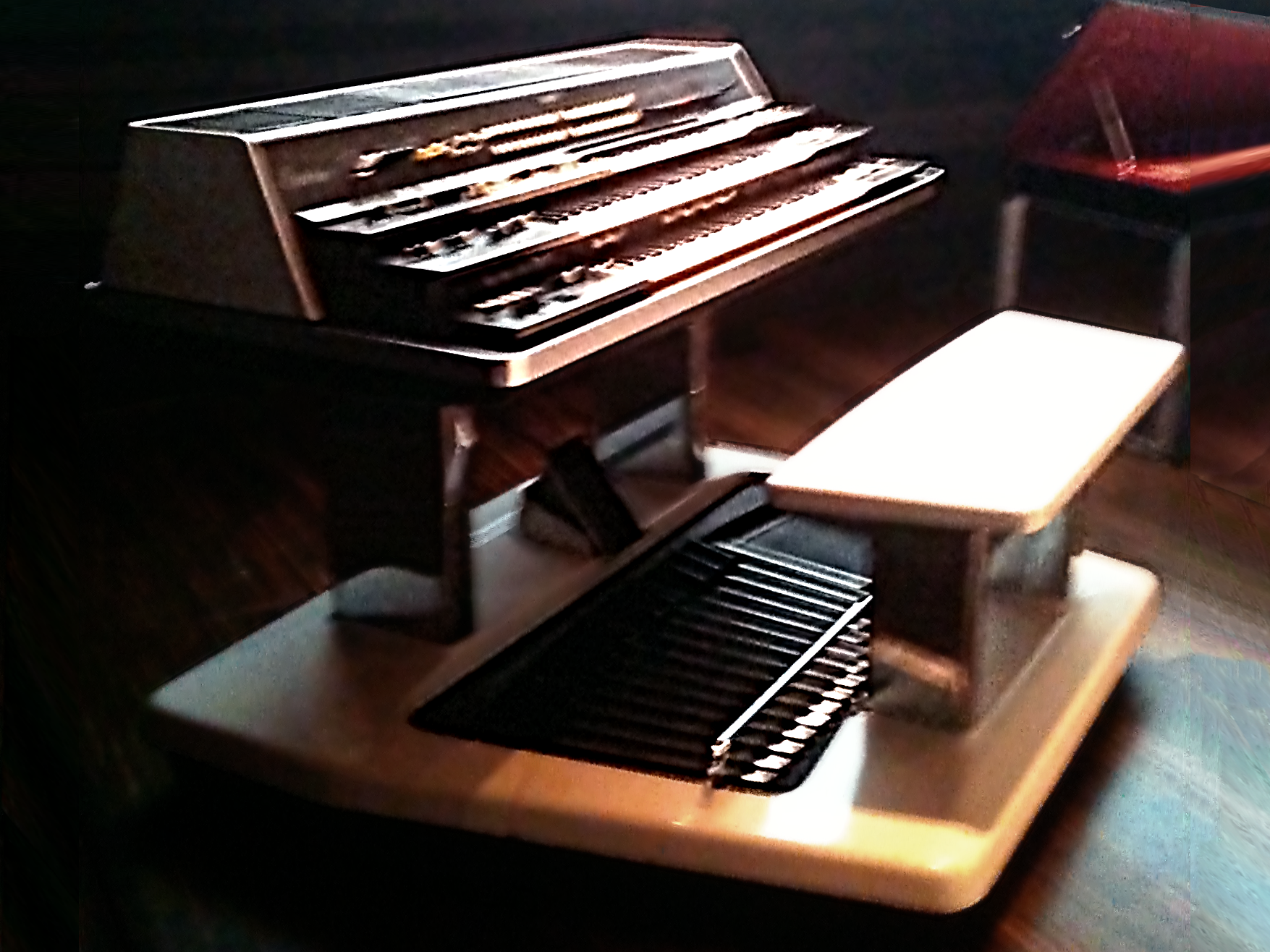
Yamaha GX-1 (1975–1982)

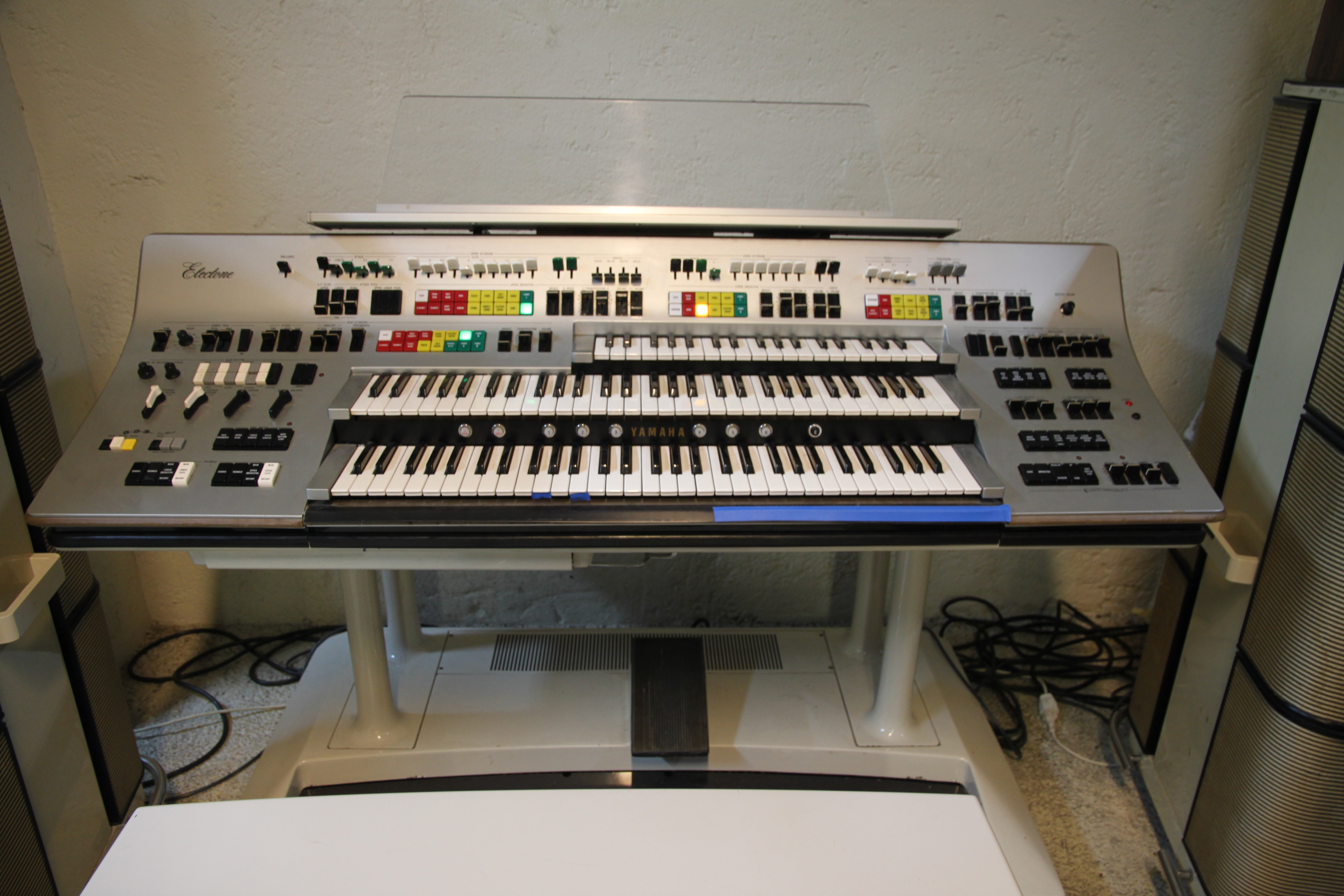
Yamaha EX-1 (1977–1983)

- EX-21 (1968, prototype of EX-42)
- EX-42 (1970–1977, stage model, design origin of GX-1)
- SY-1 (1971, solo part of GX-1, monophonic synth with initial/after touch)
- SY-2 (1971)
- GX-1 (1973 to 1982, polyphonic synth)
- EX-1 / EX-2 (1977–1983)
- FX-1 (1983–1988, FM synthesis)
- HX System1 (1987–1992)
- HX-1 / HX-1S (1987/1989, AWM(PCM)+FM)
- ELX-1 / ELX-1m (1992/2000)

Number series

- 305 / 315 (1979, export model)
- 405 / 415 (1980, U.S. models of the D-65 / D-85)
- 6000 (1981, export model)
- 7000 (1982, export model)

A series

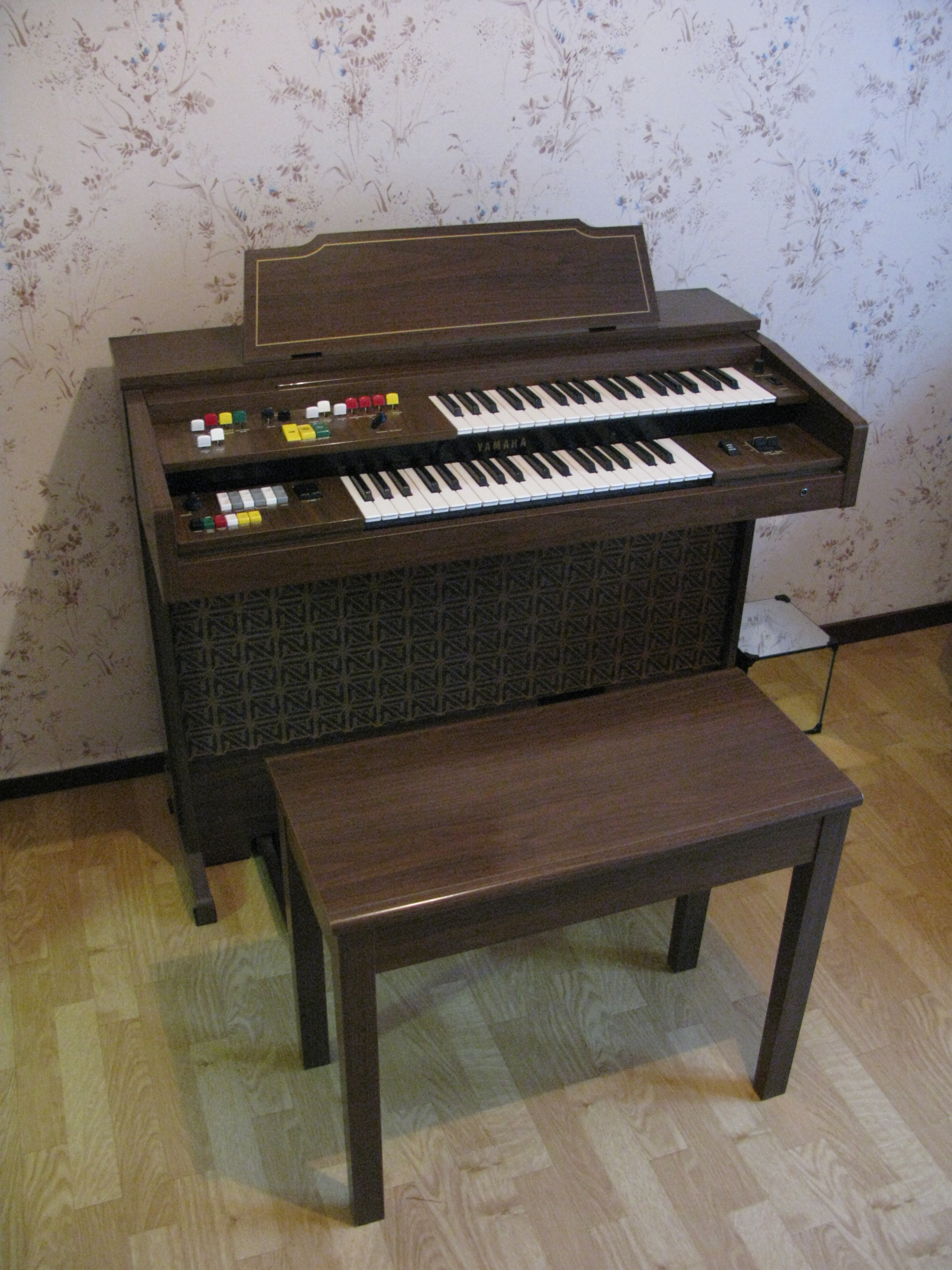
A-55 (1978)

- A-2 (1960–1963)
- A-3 (1966, red combo organ, forerunner of YC series)
- A-40 / A-60 (1977, export model)
- A-45 / A-55 (1978, export model)
- A-505 (1982, export model)

AR series

- AR-80 (1997, export model)
- AR-100 (1996, export model)

B series

- B-1 (1961–1962)
- B-3 (1964–1965)
- B-5 (1965–1969)
- B-6 (1966, export model)
- B-7 / B-7D (1967, export model)
- B-2 / B-6B (1968–1971)
- B-6E / B-12 / B-12R (1970, export model)
- B-2B / B-4 / B-5A / B-6D / B-10A (1971–1973...1978(B-4))
- B-4B / B-5BR / B-6ER / B10AR / B-20R (1971, export model)
- B-4C / B-4CR / B-10BR / B-30R (1972, export model)
- B-6R / B-10R (1972–1974/1975)
- B-5CR (1973, export model)
- B-2R (1974, export model)
- B-11 / B-20 / B-30 / B-30T / B-50 / B-50T (1974–1975...1978(B-30))
- B-20CR / B-30AR / B-40R / B-50R (1976, export model)
- B-40 / B-45 / B-60 (1977, export model)

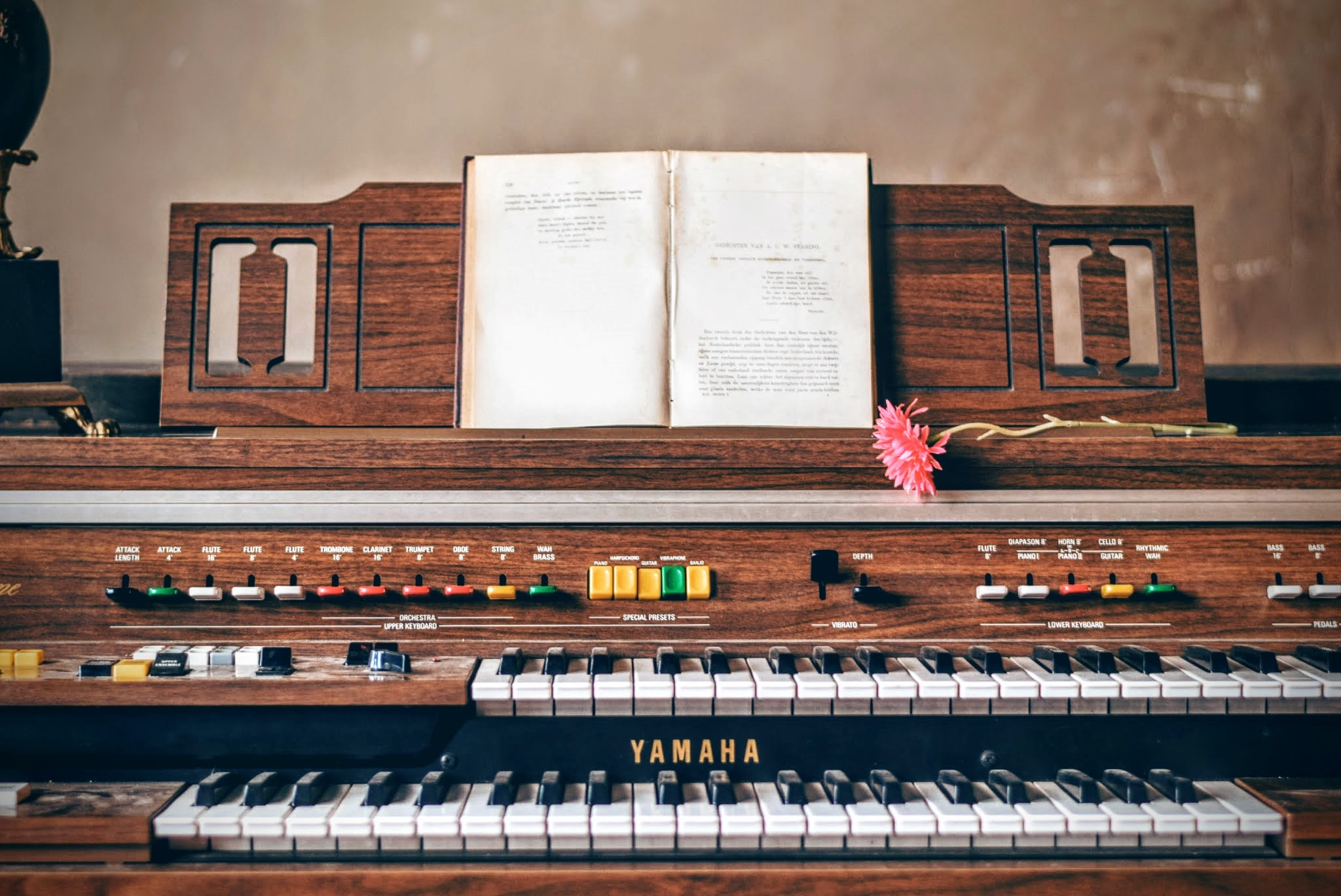
B-55 (1978)

- B-35 / B-55 / B-75 (1978, export model)
- B-70 (1979–1982)
- B-101 / B-102 / B-103 (1982–1984)
- B-204 / B-405 / B-605 / B-805 (1982, export model)
- BK-2 (1975, export model)
- BK-4 / BK-7 (1973, export model)
- BK-4C / BK-5C / BK-20C (1976, export model)
- BK-5 (1974)
- BK-6 (1971, export model)
- BK-10 (1976–1978)
- BK-20A (1972, export model)
- BK-30 / BK-50 (1975–1978)

C series

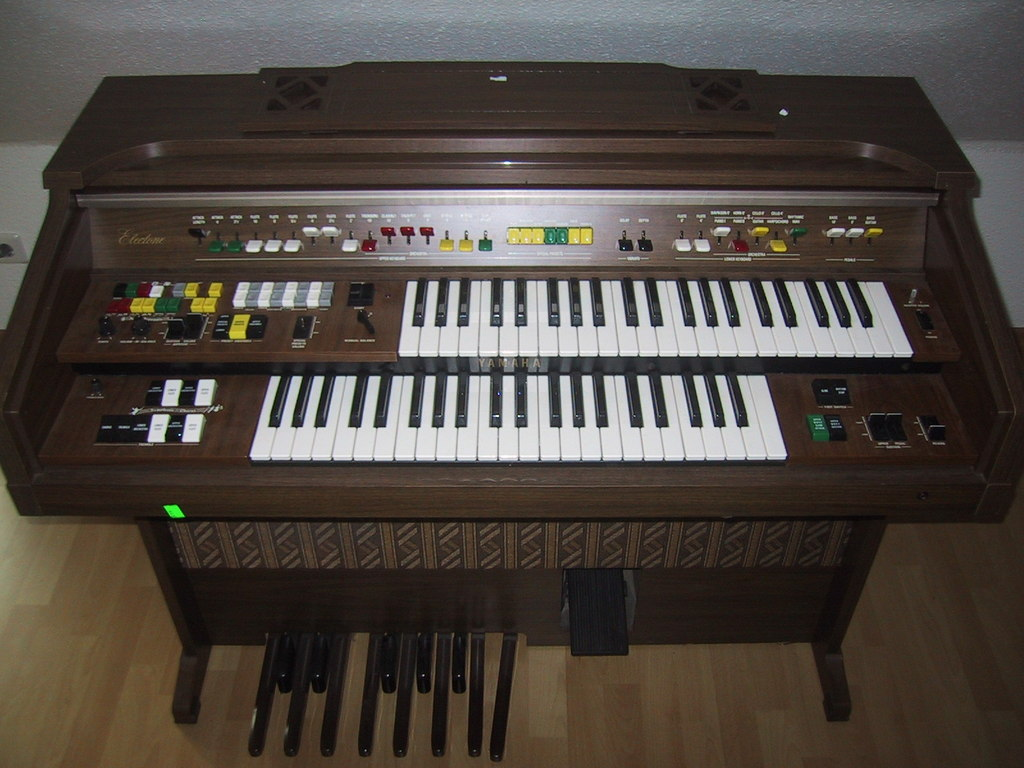
C-35 (1978)

- C-1 (1964–1966)
- C-2 / C-2S (1966–1967)
- C-1B / C-2B (1967–1971)
- C-4 / C-5A (1971–1973/1974)
- C-4R / C-5R (1972–1974/1975)
- C-10T (1973–1975)
- C-10 / C-10H / C-30 / C-30H / C-30T / C-50 / C-50T (1974–1975)
- C-40 / C-60 (1977, export model)
- C-35 / C-35i (1978, export model)
- C-80 / C-90 (1979–1982)
- C-100 / C-200 / C-300 / C-400 (1978–1981/1982(C-300))
- C-201 / C-301 / C-401 / C-501 (1982–1983/1984(C-301))
- C-405 / C-605 (1982, export model)
- C-35N / C-55N (1982, export model)
- CK-10 (1975–1978)
- CK-30 / CK-50 (1976–1978)
- CN-50 (1979, export model)
- CSY-1 (1974–1975)
- CSY-2 (1975, export model)

D series

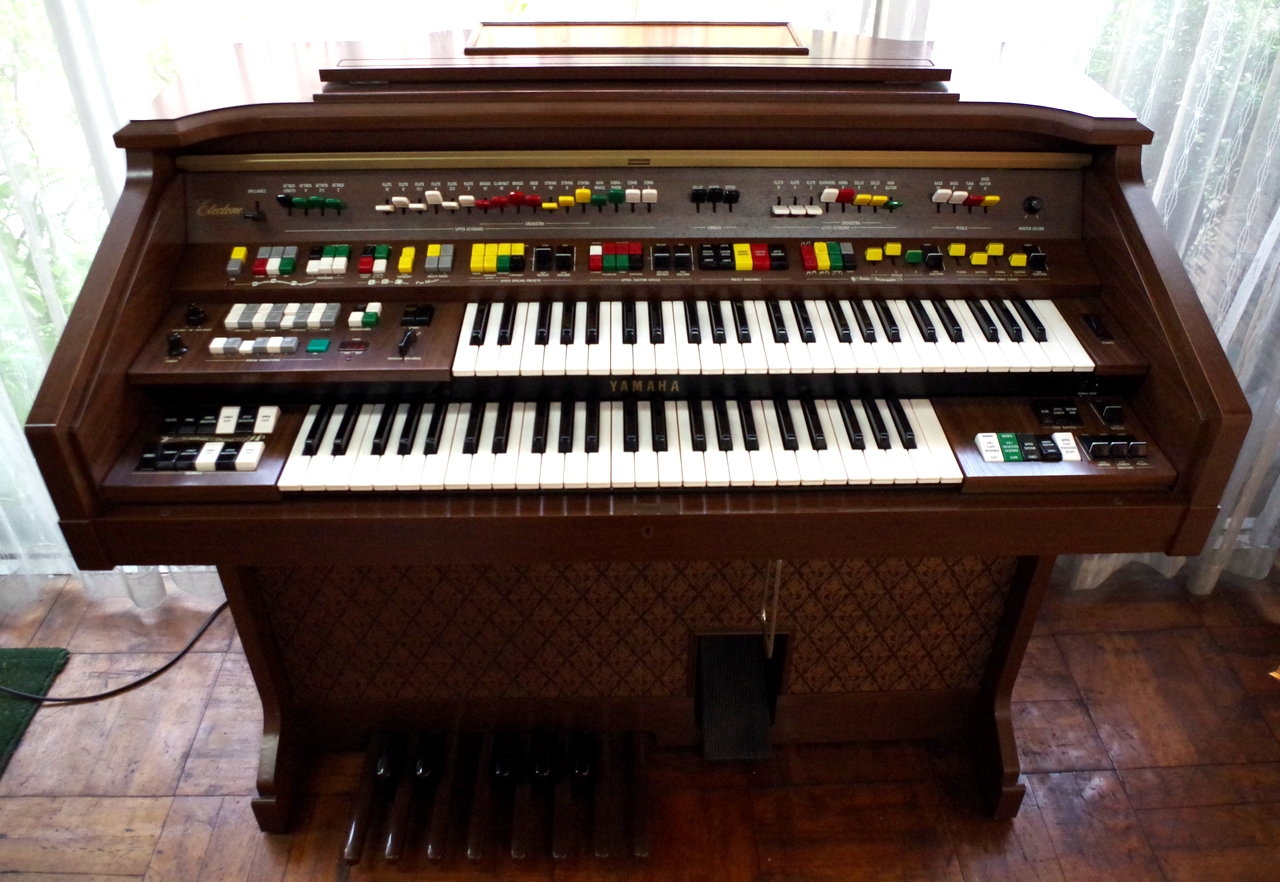
D-700 (1980–1981)

- D-1 (1959–1962)
- D-1B (1962)
- D-2 (1962, export model)
- D-2B (1967–1971)
- D-3 (1971–1972)
- D-3R / D-10 (1971–1975)
- D-7 (1969–1972)
- D-7R (1969, export model)
- D-20 / D-30 (1975–1977)
- D-30E (1976, export model)
- D-40 / D-60 / D-90 (1977–1980)
- D-65 / D-85 (1980, export model)
- D-80 (1977, export model)
- D-600 / D-700 / D-800 (1980–1981/1983)
- D-500 (1983)
- DK-40A (1972, export model)
- DK-40C (1976, export model)

E series

- E-1 (1962–1966)
- E-2 (1966–1968)
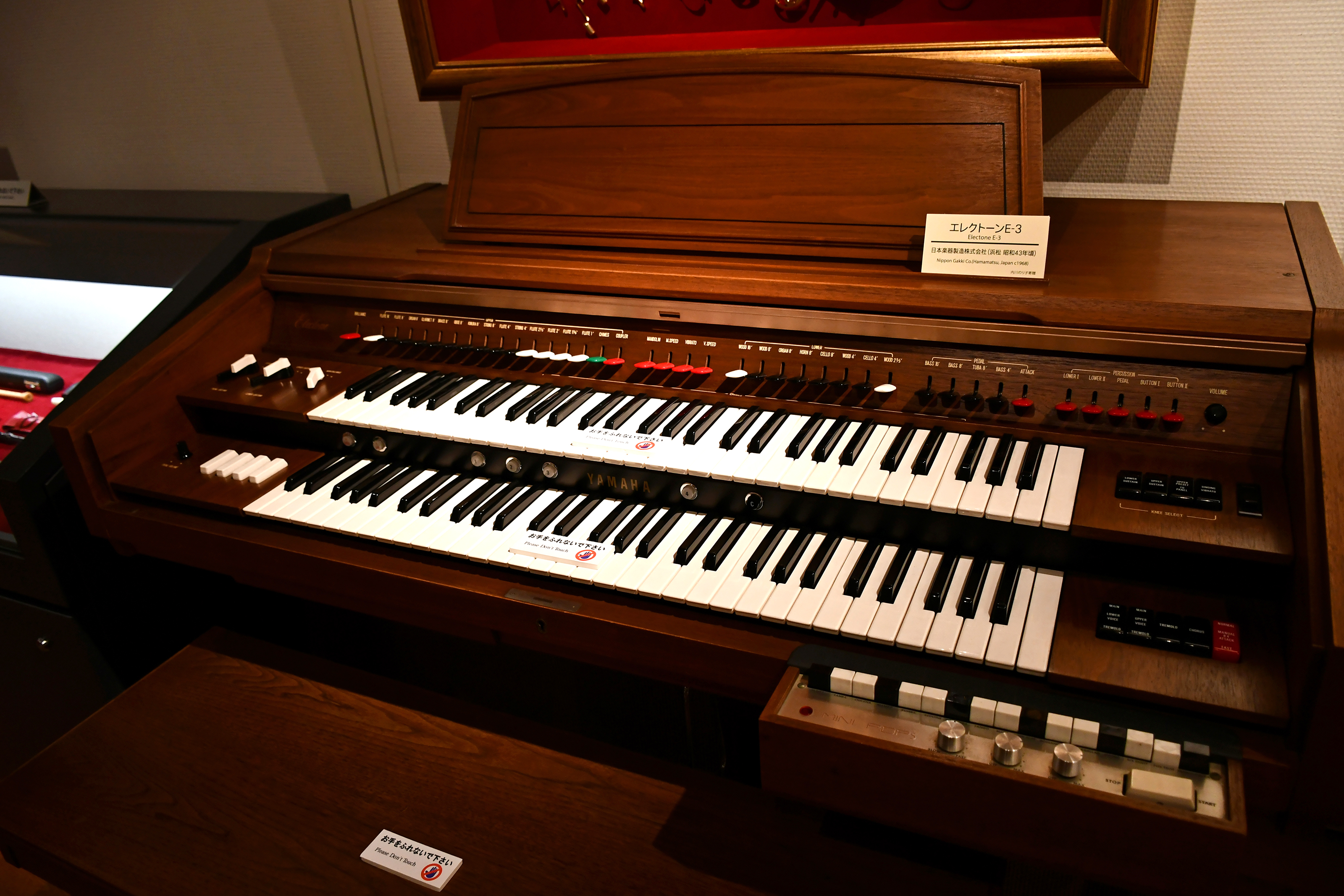
- Yamaha Electone E-3 (1968–1972) on display at Hamamatsu Museum of Musical Instruments.
  E-3 (1968–1972)
- E-3R (1970)
- E-5 (1971, export model)
- E-5AR (1973, export model)
- E-10 (1975–1977)
- E-10AR (1972, export model)
- E-20 (1972–1977)
- E-30 / E-50 / E-70 (1977–1980/1981)
- E-70 (1977–1981, PASS)
- E-45 / E-75 (1981, export model)
- E-500 / E-700 (1981–1982/1983)

EL series (AWM(PCM) + FM)

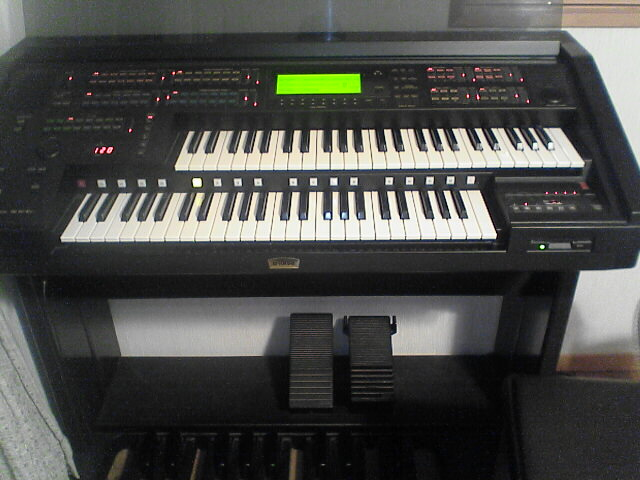
EL-900m (2000–2003)

- EL-7
- EL-15
- EL-17 (1995–2002)
- EL-20 (1993–2000)
- EL-25
- EL-27 (1993–2000)
- EL-37 (1994–2000)
- EL-30 (1991–1996)
- EL-40
- EL-50 (1991–1996)
- EL-57 (1996–1999)
- EL-70 (1991–1996)
- EL-87 / EL-87W (1995–1999)
- EL-90 (1991–1998)
- EL-100 (2002–2006)
- EL-200 (2000–2002)
- EL-400 (2000–2006)
- EL-500 (1999–2003)
- EL-700 (1999–2003)
- EL-900 (1998–2003)
- EL-900B (2002–2003)
- EL-900m (2000–2003)
- ELA-1 (2022)
- ELK-10 (1994–2001)
- ELK-400 (2001–2006)
- ELX-1 (1992–2000)
- ELX-1m (2000–2005)

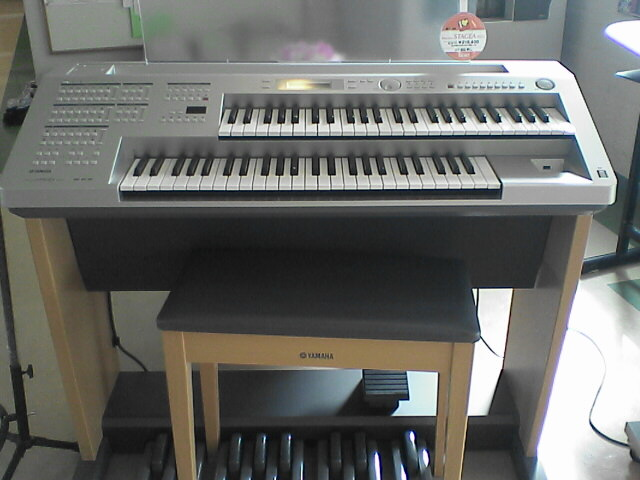
ELB-01 (2006–2015)

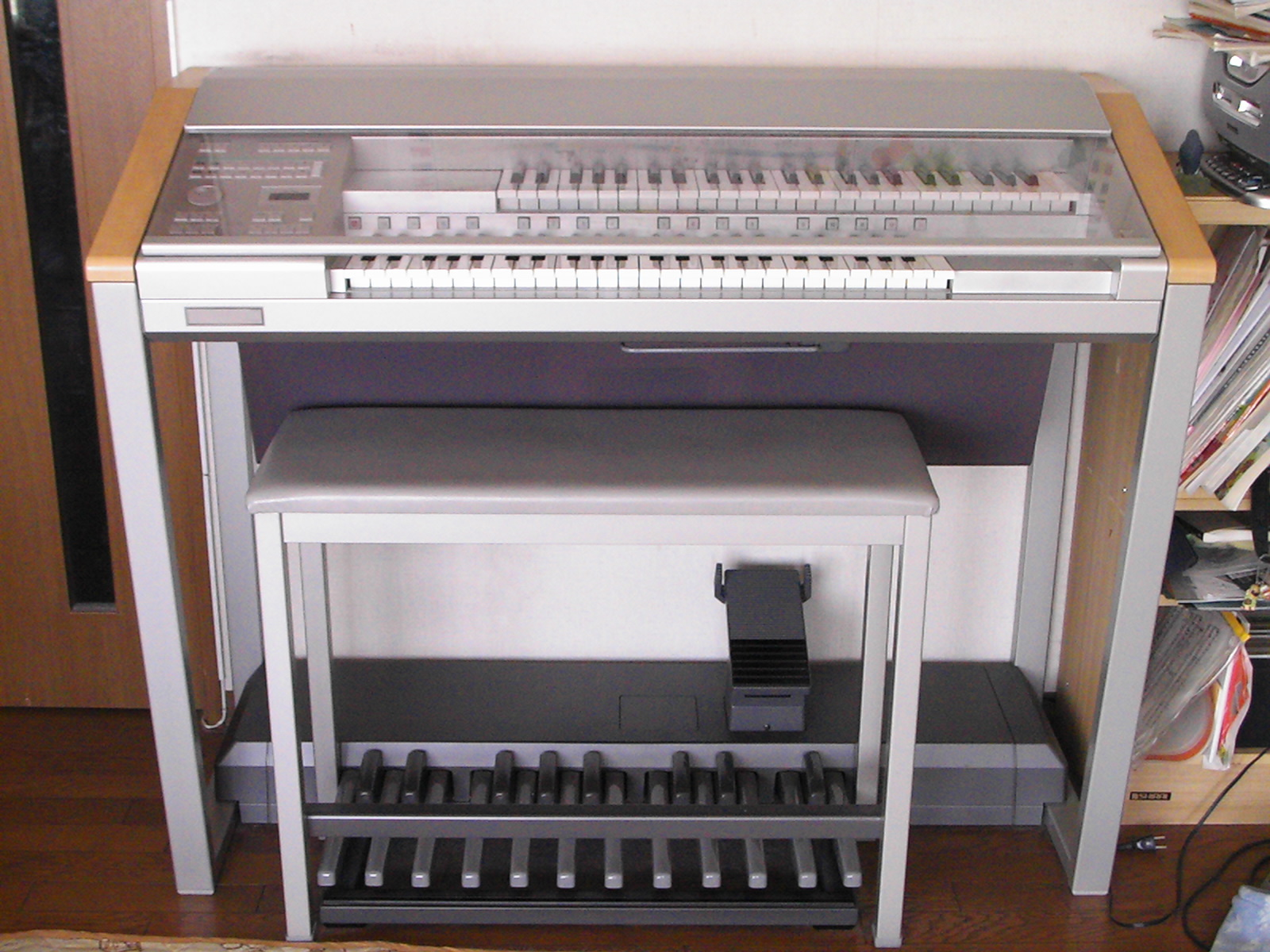
Stagea ELS-01 (2004–2014)

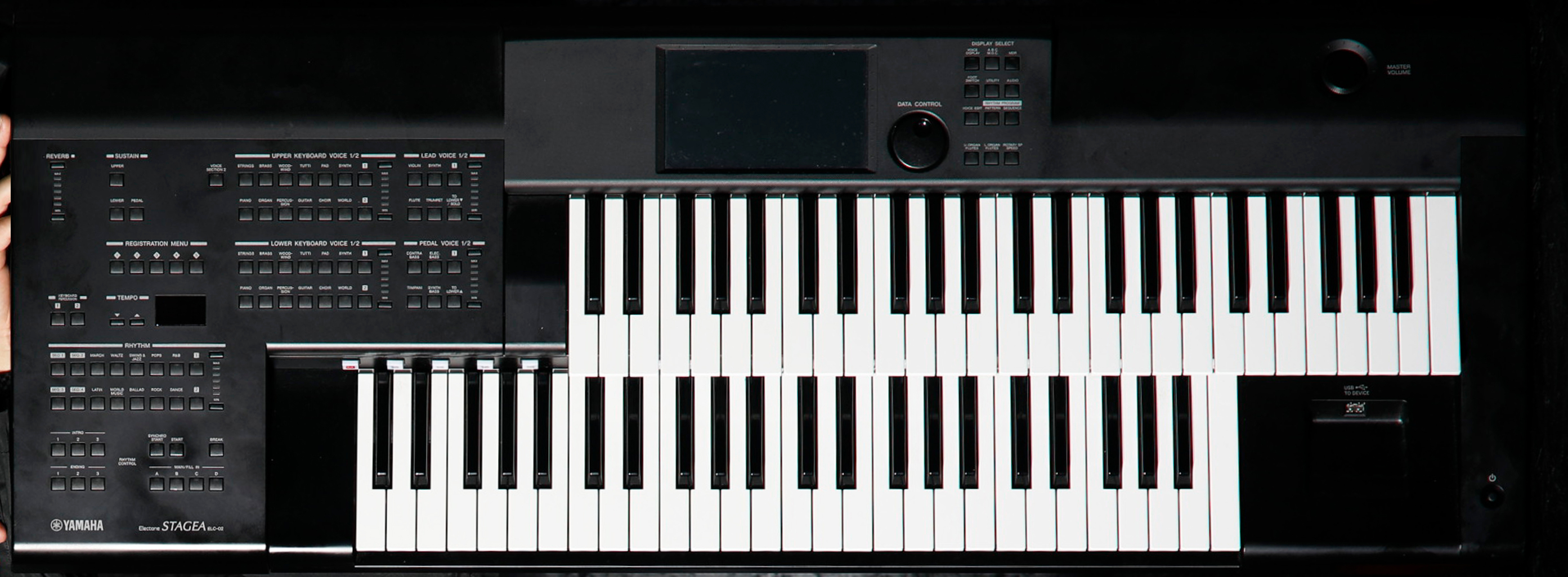
Stagea ELC-02 (2016–2026)

Stagea series

- ELB-01 / ELB-01K (2006–2015)
- ELS-01 / ELS-01C (2004–2014)
- ELS-01X (2005–2014)
- ELS-01U / ELS-01CU / ELS-01XU (2009–2014)
- ELS-02 / ELS-02C / ELS-02X (2014–2026)
- ELB-02 (2015-)
- ELC-02 (2016–2026)
- ELS-03G / ELS-03X / ELS-03XR / ELS-03XF (2026-)

Stagea D-Deck series

- DDK-7 (2006, Stagea with portable keyboard style)

F series

- F-1 (1964–1979)
- F-2 (1966–1975)

F series console organ

- F-30 / F-70 / F-50 (1981–1988)
- F-5 / F-15 / F-25 / F-35 / F-45 / F-55 (1984, export model)
- F-100 / F-200 (1994–2000)
- F-300 / F-400 (1992–2000/1996)
- F-700 (1989)

FC/FE/FS/FX series (FM synthesis)

- FC-10 / FC-20 (1984–1986)
- FE-30 / FE-40 / FE-50 / FE-50M / FE-50MB / FE-60 / FE-70 (1984–1986/1987)
- FS-20 / FS-30 / FS-30M / FS-50 / FS-70 (1983–1986...1988(FS-30M))
- FS-30A (1986–1987)
- FS-100 / FS-200 / FS-300 / FS-500 (1983, export model)
- FX-1 / FX-3 / FX-10 / FX-20 (1983–1987/1988)

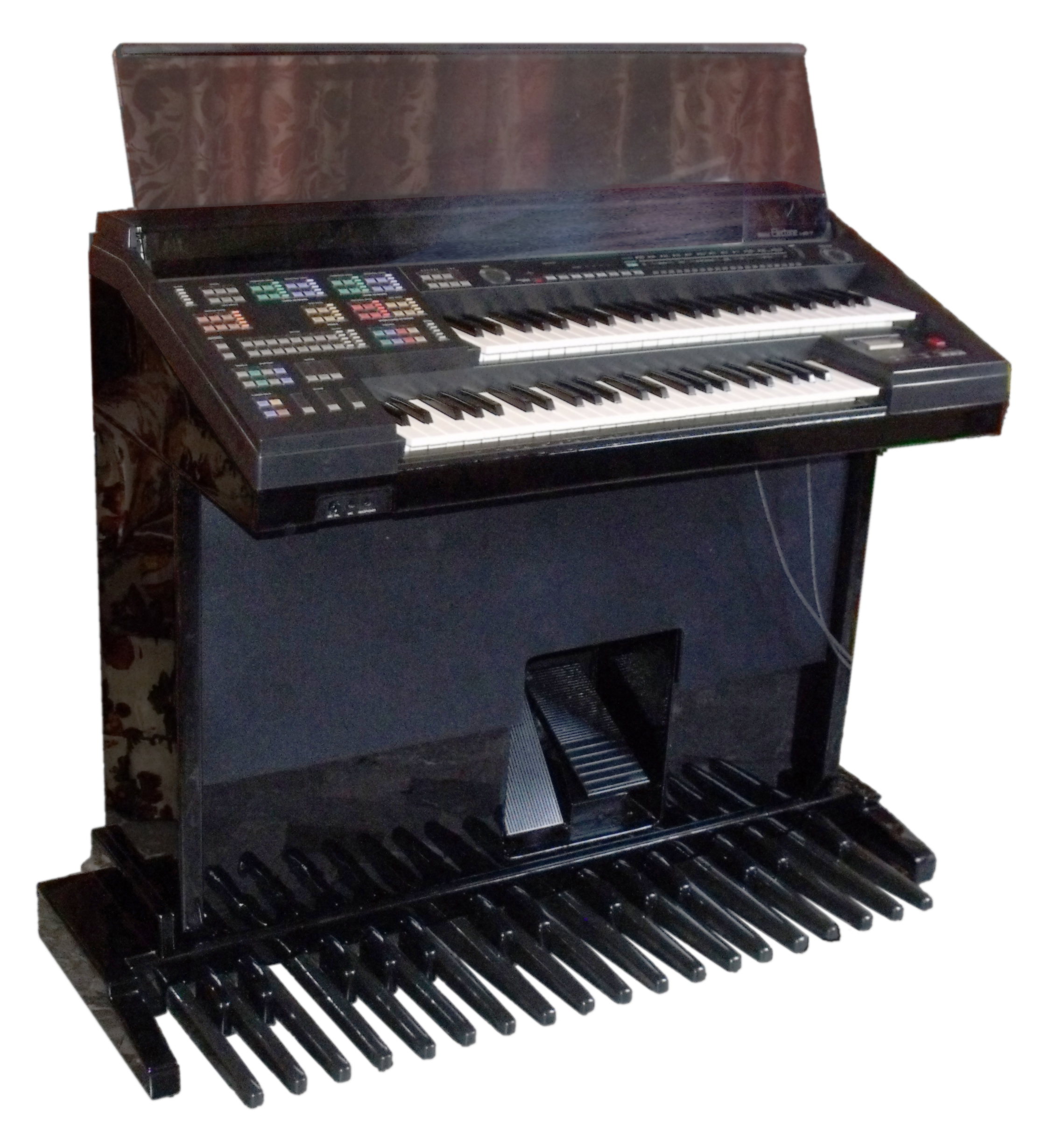
HS-7+

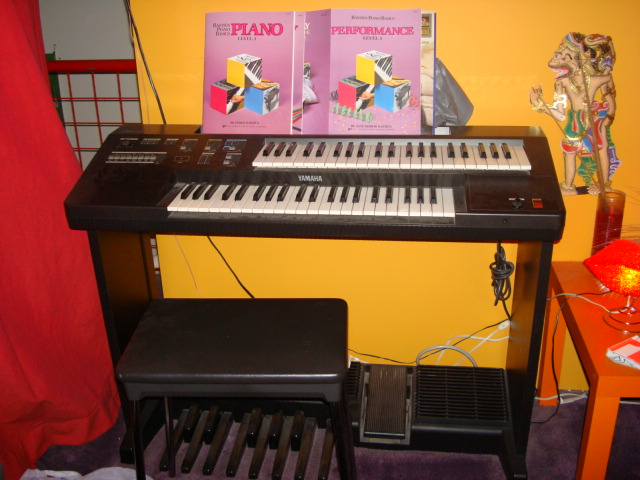
ME10

HA/HC/HE/HK/HS/HX series (AWM(PCM) + FM)

- HA-10 (1988–2001, 1manual)
- HC-1 / HC-3 (1989–1994/1993)
- HE-5 (1988–1994)
- HK-10 (1988–1995)
- HS-4 / HS-5 / HS-6 / HS-7/ HS-8 (1987–1992)
- HX System1 (1987–1992)
- HX-3 / HX-5 (1987–1992)
- HX-1S (1989)
- CHX-1 (1987, export model)

MC Series

- MC-200 / MC-400 / MC-600

ME series

- ME-400 / ME-600 (1985–1987)
- ME-15 / ME-35 / ME-55 (1986–1989, portable keyboard style)

MR series

- MR-1 (1983, export model, single manual)

T series

- T-30 / T-60 (1966)

US series

- US-1 (1988, export model)
- US-1000 (1988, export model, single manual)

==== Combo organs ====
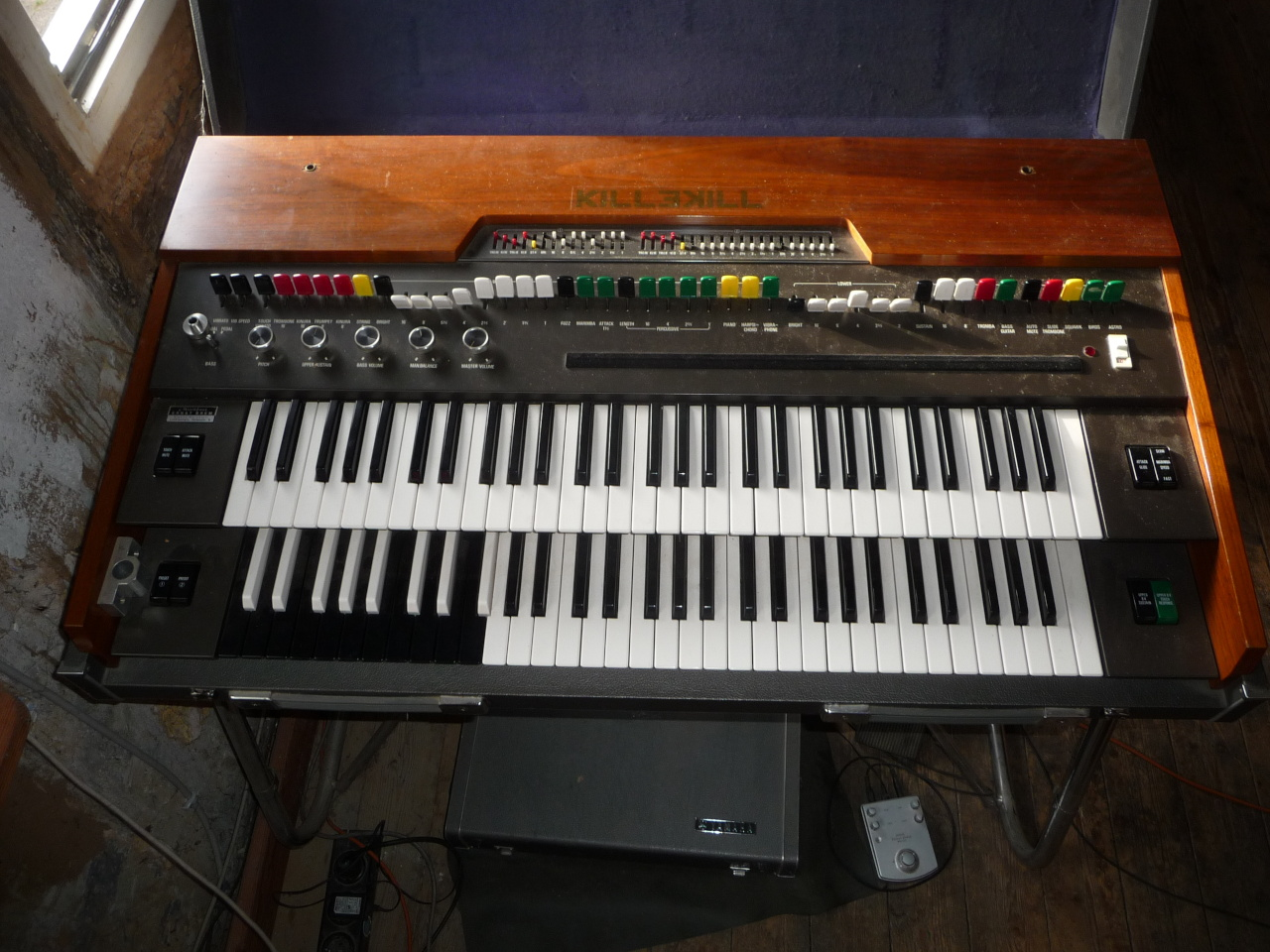
YC-45D

- A-3 (1966)

YC series

- YC-10 (1969)
- YC-20 (1970)
- YC-30 (1970)
- YC-25D (1972)
- YC-45D (1972)
- YC-61/YC-73/YC-88 (2021) Based on Yamaha CP73 and CP88 and Nord with added drawbars

Reface series (digital)

- Reface YC (2015)

==== Ensemble keyboards ====
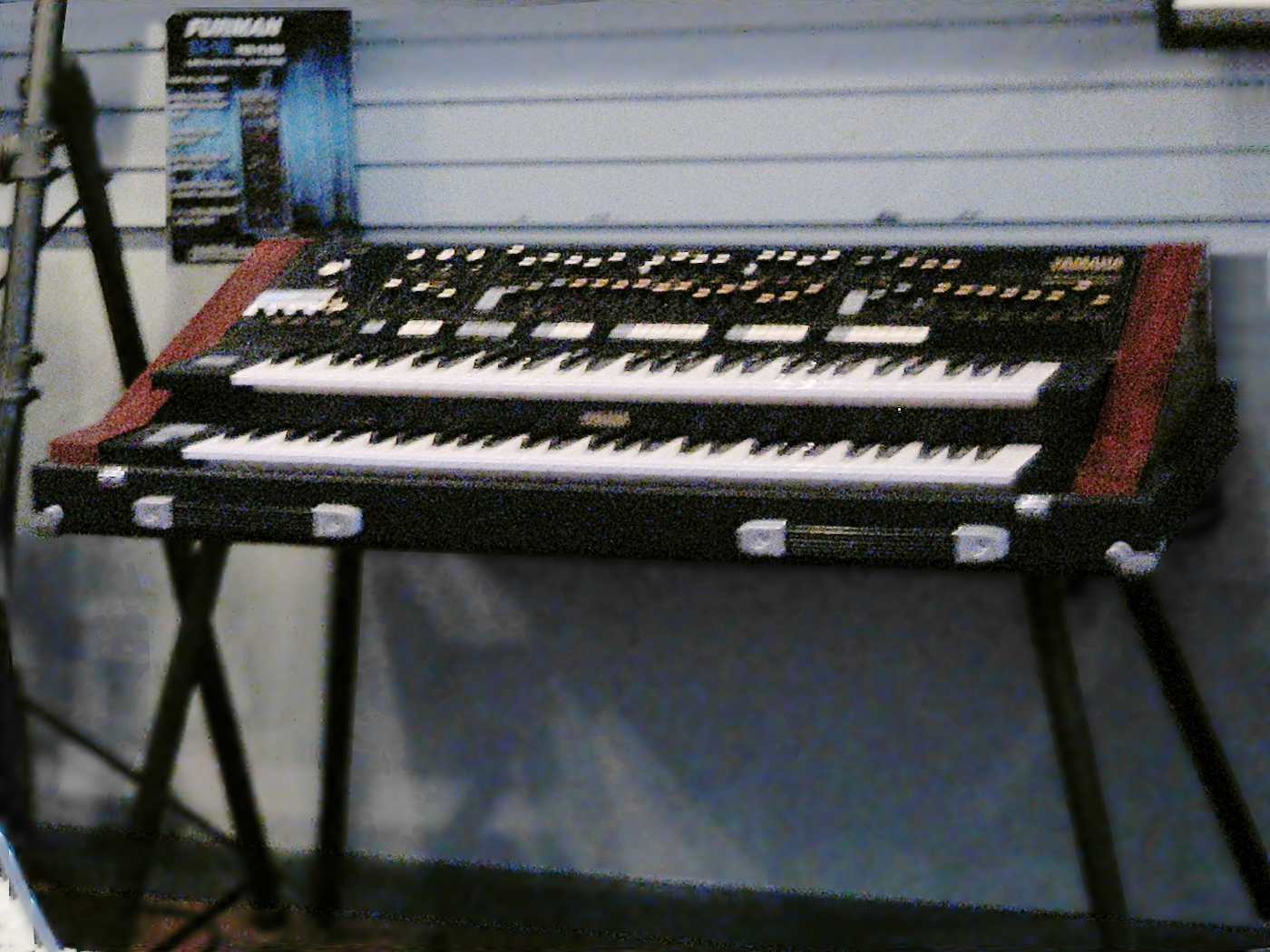
SK50D Symphonic Ensemble

- SS30 (1977, string ensemble)
- CE20 / CE25 (1982) — cost down preset version of FM synth GS1 / GS2.
- SY20 (1982, ensemble synthesizer for classroom)

SK series

- SK10 (1979, organ/string/brass)
- SK15 (1981, organ/poly-synth/string)
- SK20 (1980, organ/poly-synth)
- SK30 (1980, organ/poly-synth/solo-synth)
- SK50D (1980, 2 manuals organ/poly-synth/solo-synth/bass)

=== Synthesizers ===
- Magna organ (1935–?) — See #Magna Organ.

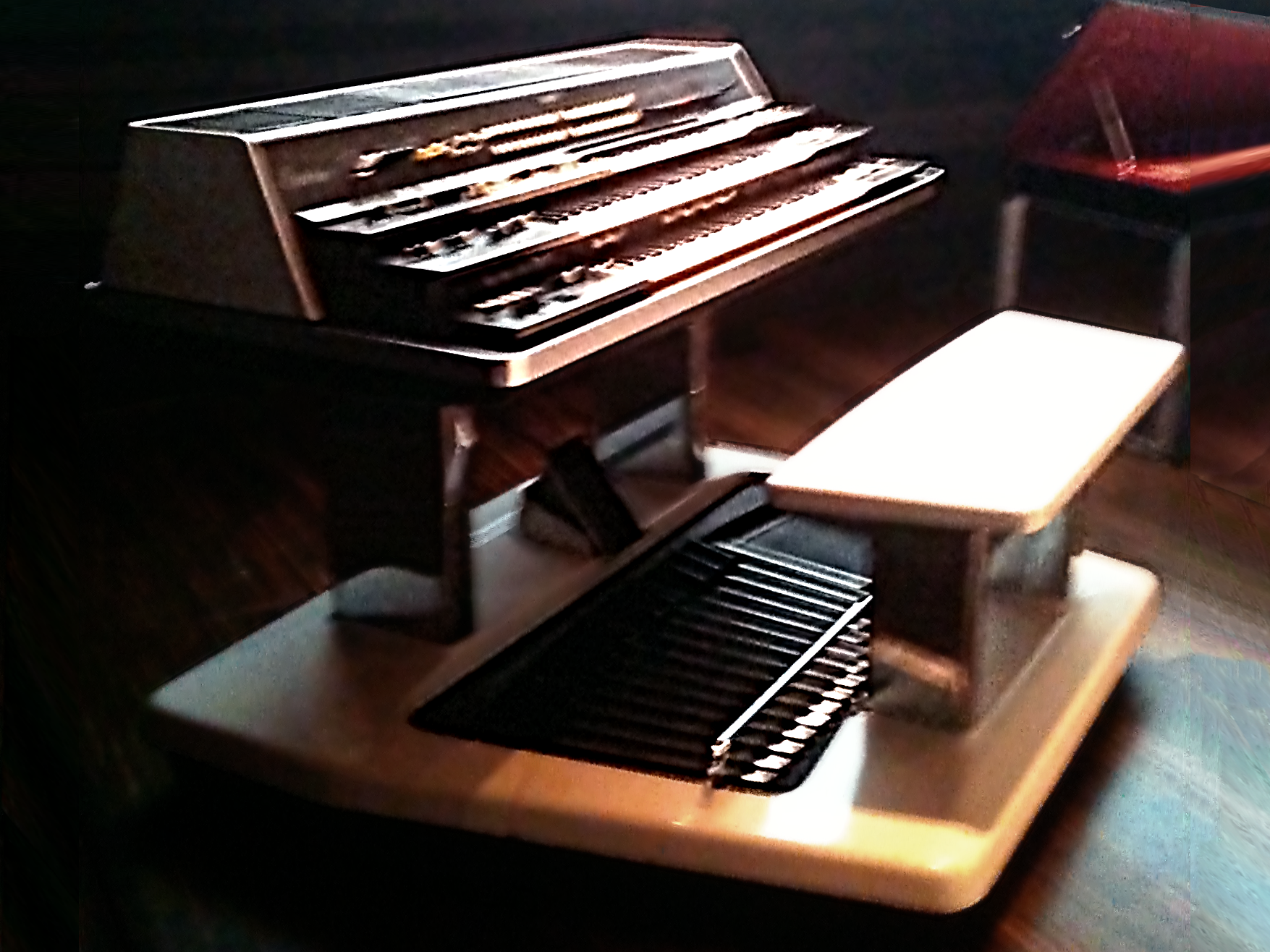
Yamaha GX-1

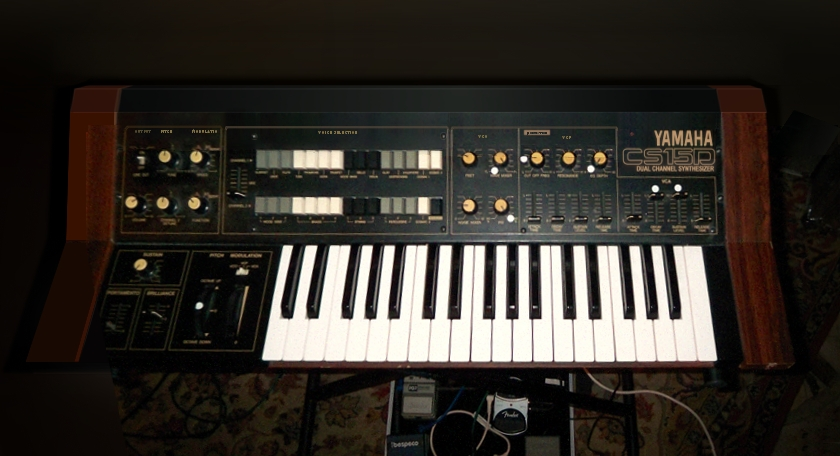
CS-15D

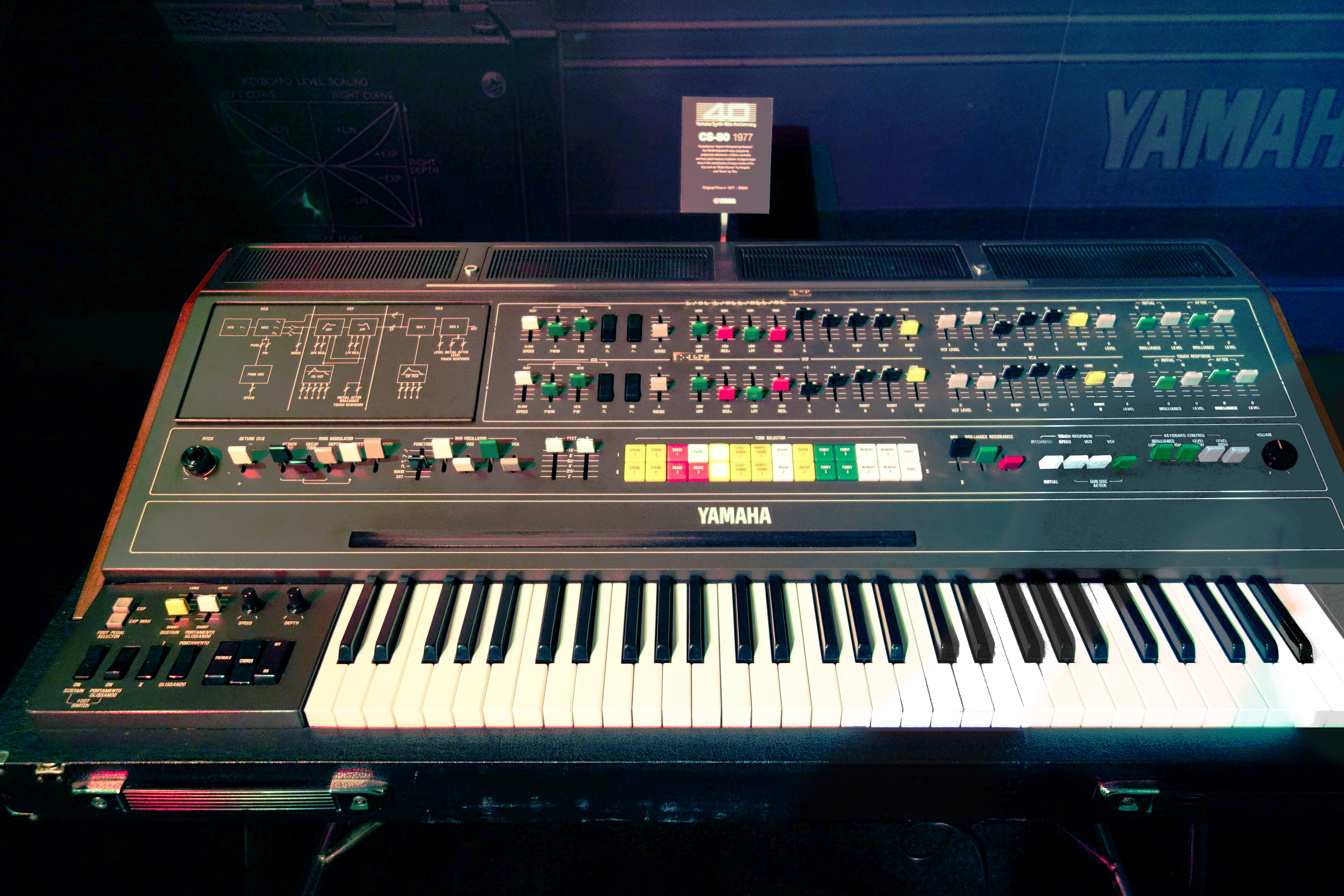
CS-80

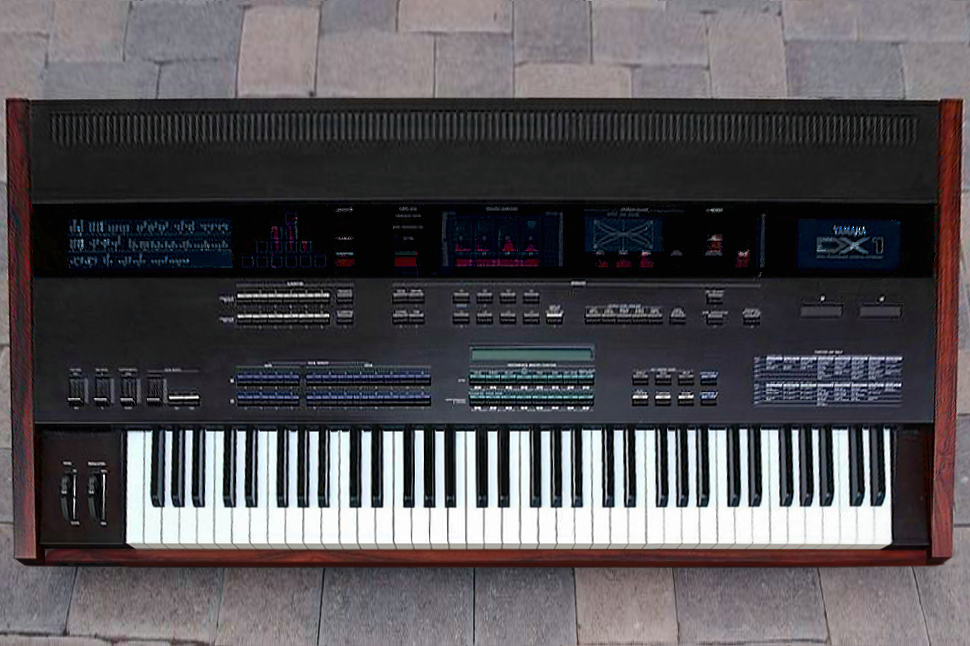
DX1

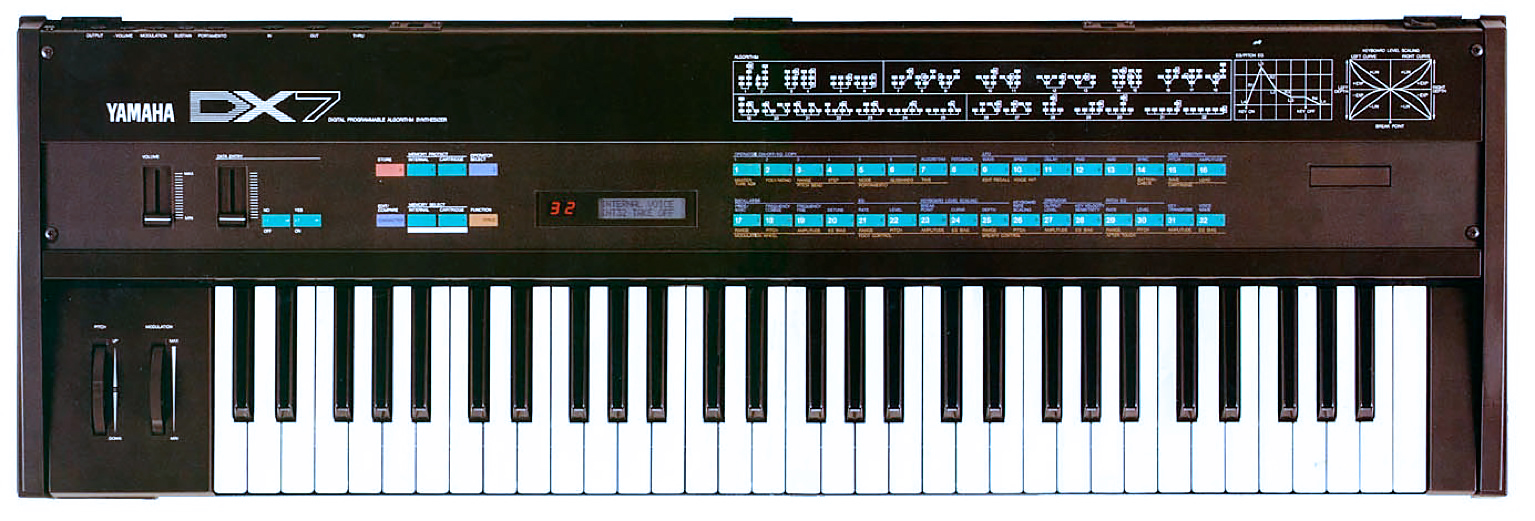
DX7

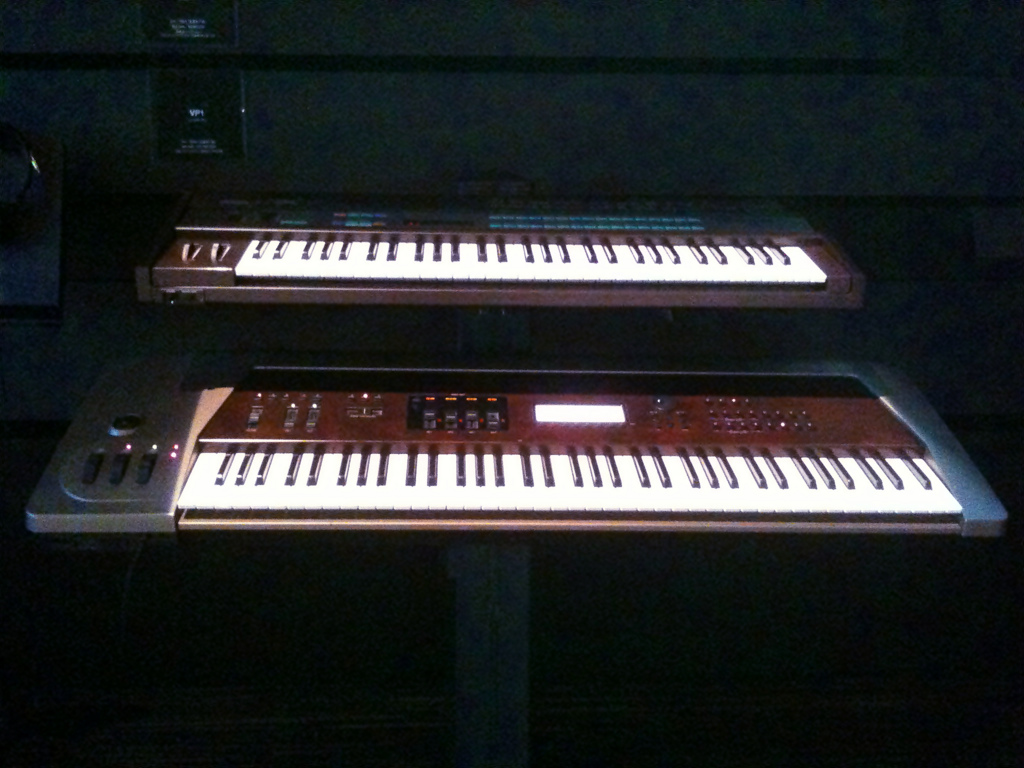
VP1

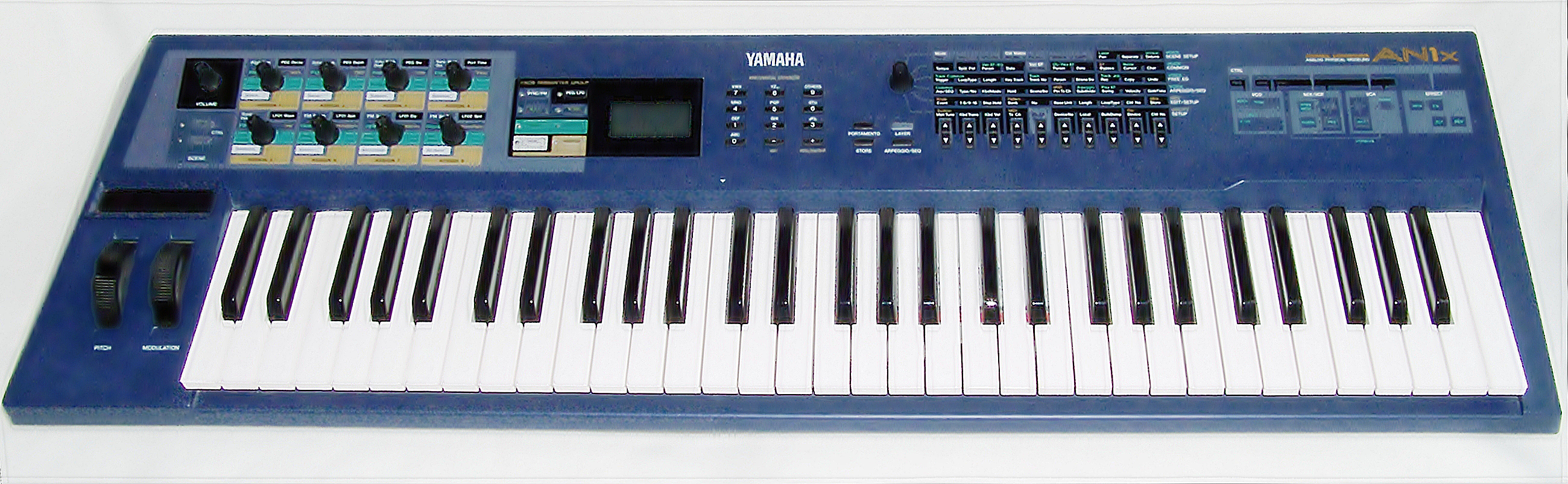
AN1x

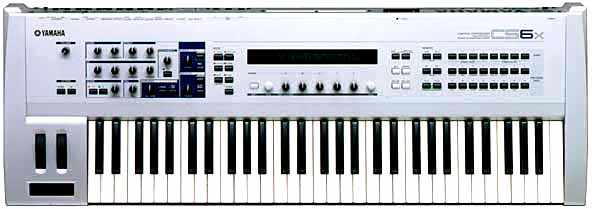
CS6x

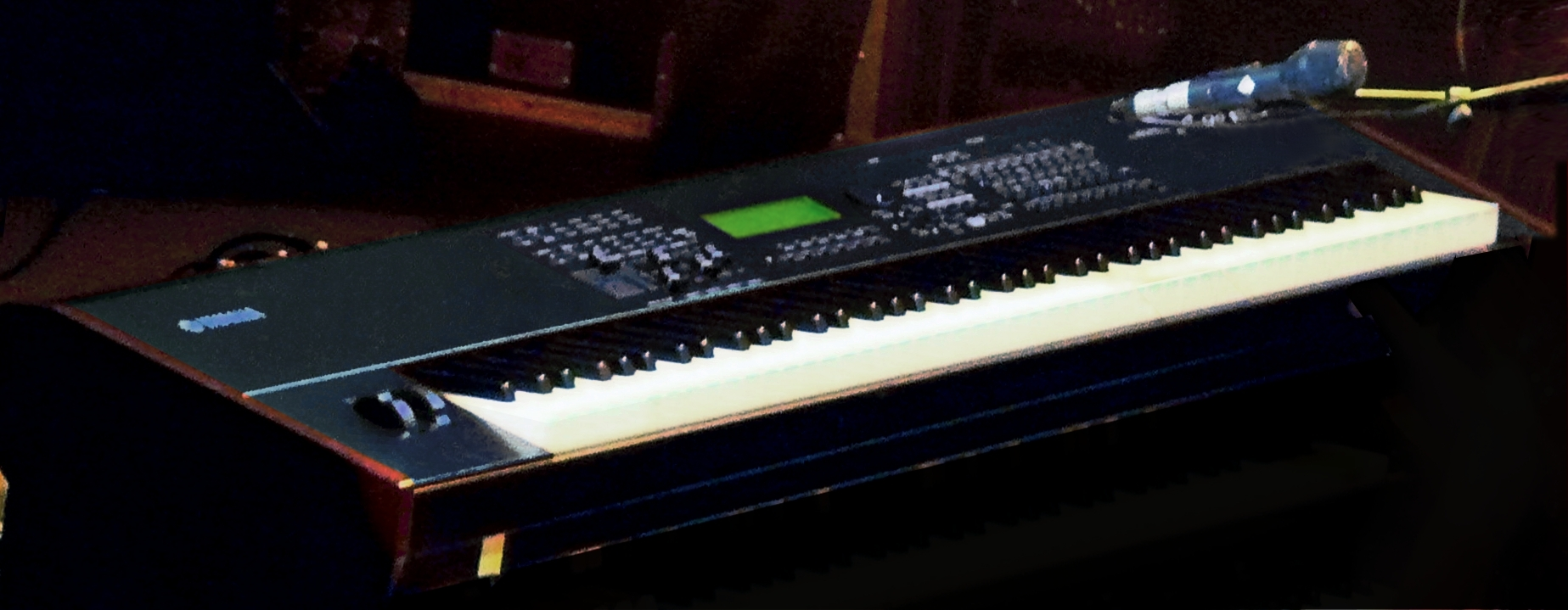
S90 ES

GX

- GX-1 (1973/1975–1982) — 1st polyphonic synthesizer of Yamaha, released as Electone electronic organ

SY series

- SY-1 (1974, solo part of GX-1, monophonic synth with initial/after touch)
- SY-2 (c. 1975, a successor of SY-1)
- For the workstations, see below

CS series (monophonic)

- CS-01 (1982, shoulder keyboard, with breath controller)
- CS-5 (1978)
- CS-10 (1977)
- CS-15 (1978, monophonic dual channel)
- CS-15D (1978, monophonic dual channel)
- CS-20M (1979, monophonic, patch memory)
- CS-30 / CS30L (1977, monophonic dual modules, L = live performance version without analog seq.)

CS series (polyphonic)

- CS-40M (1979, 2-voice, patch memory)
- CS-50 (1977, 4-voice)
- CS-60 (1977, 8-voice)
- CS-70M (1981, 6-voice dual channel, patch memory, polyphonic seq.)
- CS-80 (1976, 8-voice dual channel)

DX/TX series

- DX1 (1983, dual DX7 with display)
- DX5 (1985, dual DX7)
- DX7 / DX7S (1983/1987)
- DX7IID / DX7IIFD (1986)
- DX7IIFD centennial / DX7IIC (1987)
- DX9 (1983, 4op FM)
- DX11 (1987, 4op FM)
- TX816 — clustering rack version of 8× DX7
- TX7 (1985) — desktop module version of DX7
- TX802 — rack mount version of DX7II except for unison
- TX81Z (1987) — rack mount versions of DX11

- DX21 (1985, 4op FM)
- DX27 / DX27S / SDX27S (1985/1986/1986, S = speakers, SDX = classroom model)
- DX100 (1985, 4op FM, DX27 with mini keyboard)

VL/VP series (virtual acoustic)

- VL1 / VL1m (1993/1994, Self oscillation/Virtual Acoustic synthesizer)
- VL7 / VL70m (1994/1996, cost down version of VL1/VL1m)
- VP1 (1994, Free oscillation/Virtual Acoustic synthesizer)

CSx/ANx series (virtual analog / sample-based synthesis)

- AN1x (1997, virtual analog)
- CS1x (1996, similar to MU50. AWM2 engine, sample-based synthesis.)
- CS2x (1998, similar to MU90 except for insertion effects. AWM2 engine.)
- CS6x / CS6R (1999, support MSPS. AWM2 engine.)

S series

- S03[BL] / S03SL (2001/2004, BL = black, SL = silver)
- S08 (2002, extended version of S03, support XG and GM2)
- S30 (2000, based on CS6x)
- S70 XS (2009, based on Motif XS without sequencer and sampler)
- S80 (1999, based on CS6x)
- S90 (2002, based on Motif 8 without sequencer and sampler)
- S90ES (2005, based on Motif 8 ES without sequencer and sampler, support MSPS)
- S90XS (2009, based on Motif XS without sequencer and sampler)
- MX49 / MX61 (2012) - successor to MM6/MM8, with more than 1000 sounds from Motif XS
- MX88 (2017)

Reface series

- Reface CS (2015, 8 voice (single multimode oscillator per voice), virtual analog synthesizer based on the CS series)
- Reface DX (2015, 8 voice, 4-op FM synthesizer based on the DX series)

==== Music workstations ====
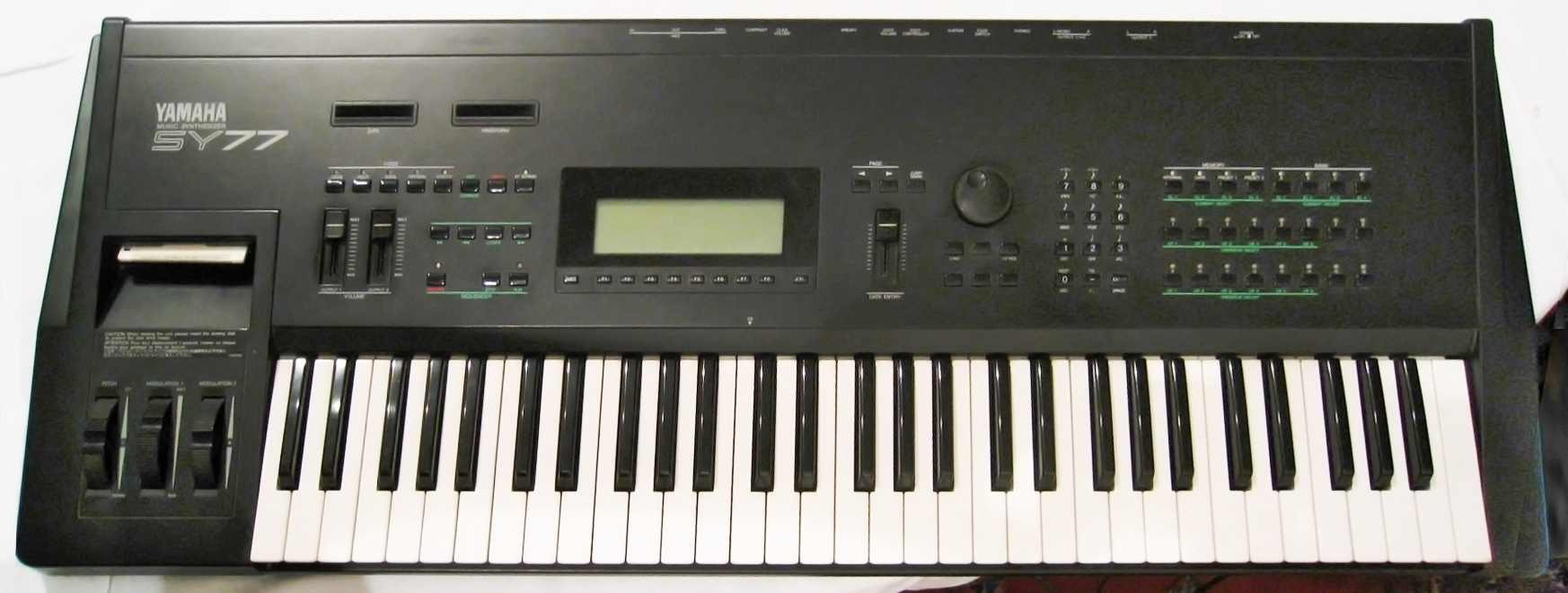
SY77

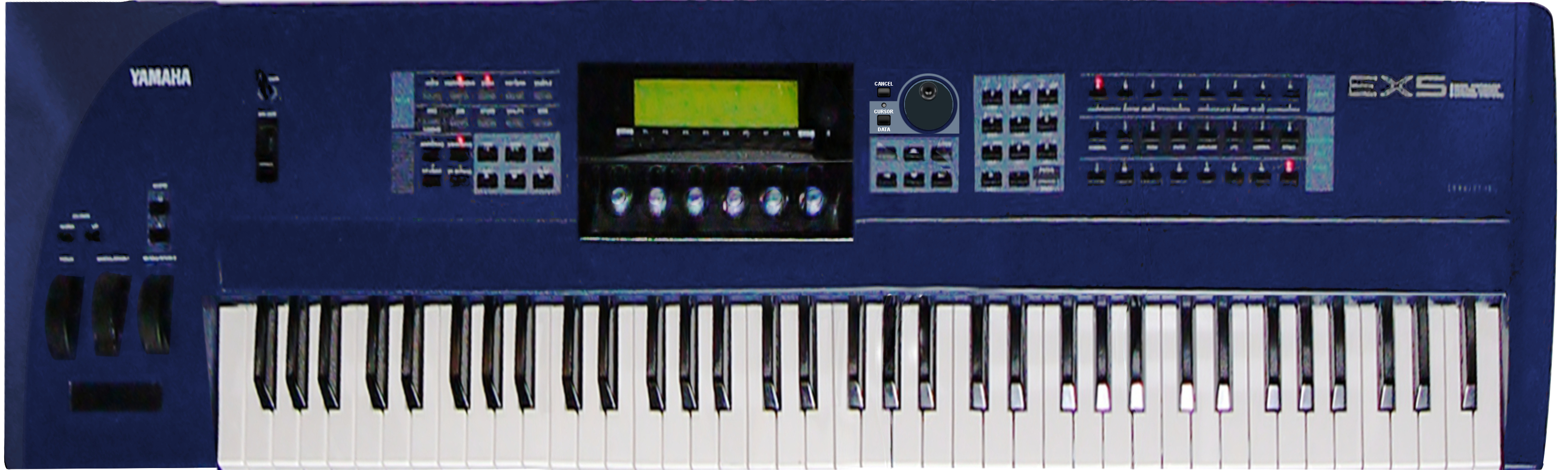
EX5

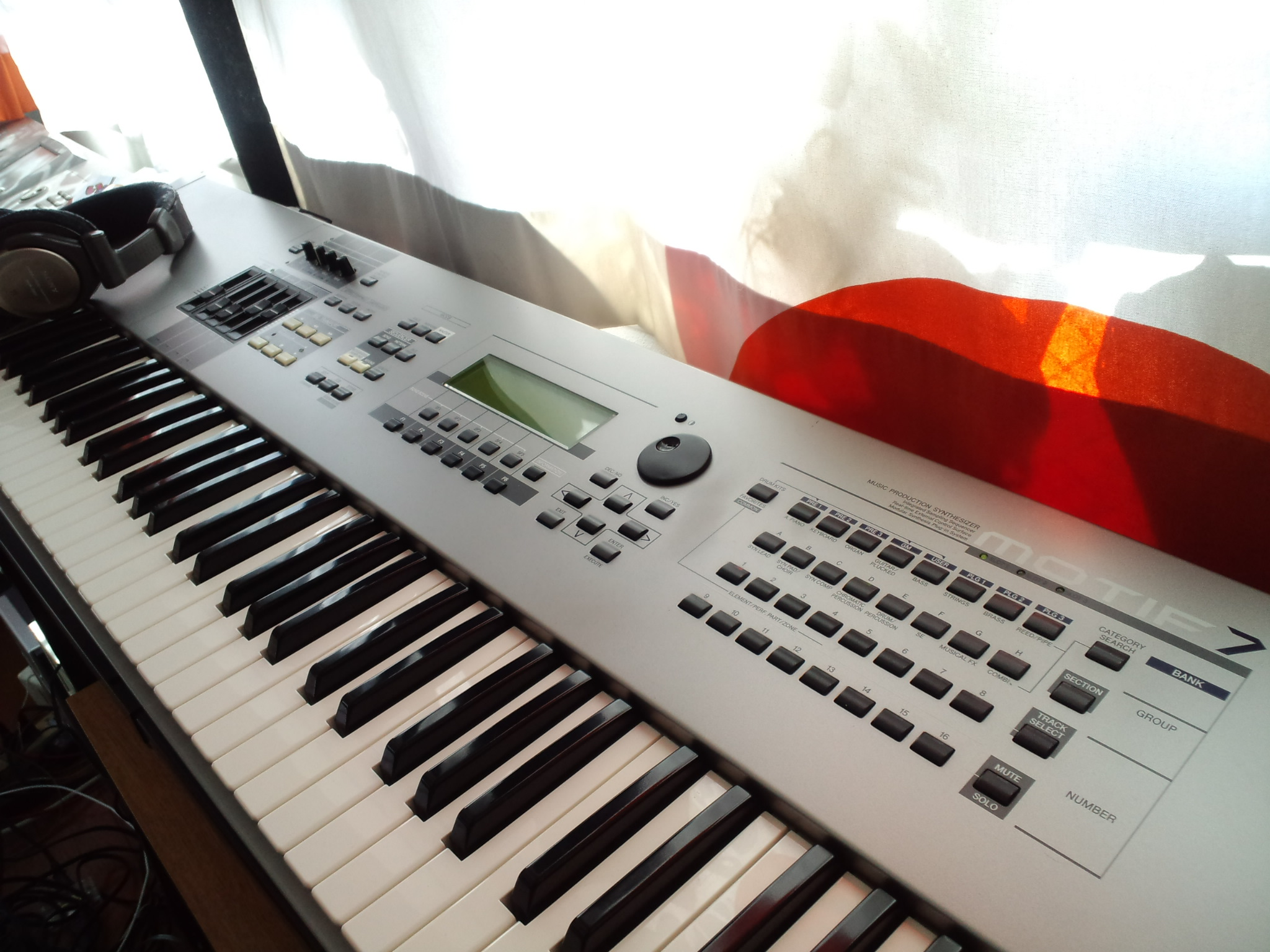
Motif 7

MM6

V series

- V2 (1987, marketed outside Japan as DX11. keyboard version of TX81Z)
- V50 (1989, music workstation, successor of DX11)

SY series (AFM/PCM/RCM(PCM×AFM))

- SY22 (1990) — AWM2 and FM-based Vector synthesis
- SY35 (1992) — AWM2 and FM-based Vector synthesis
- SY55 (1990) — PCM-only (AWM2), without Sample RAM (like SY77)
- SY77 (1989) — RCM synthesis
- SY85 (1992) — PCM-only (AWM2), with Sample RAM
- SY99 (1991) — RCM synthesis
- TG33 (1990) — rack mount version of SY22
- TG55 (1989) — rack mount version of SY55
- TG500 (1992) — rack mount version of SY85
- TG77 (1990)— rack mount version of SY77
- FS1R (1998) — FM and formant synthesis

W series

- W5 / W5 ver.2 (1994/1995)
- W7 / W7 ver.2 (1994/1995) — 61-key, AWM2 synthesis

EX series

- EX5 / EX5S / EX5R (1998)
- EX7 (1998)

Motif series

- Motif 6/7/8 (2001)
- Motif-Rack (2002)
- Motif ES 6/7/8 (2003)
- Motif-Rack ES (2004)
- MO6 / MO8 / SDX-4000 (SDX = classroom keyboard based on MO6S) (2005)
- MM6 / MM8 (2007/2008) - successor to EOS B2000
- Motif XS 6/7/8 (2007)
- Motif-Rack XS (2008)
- Motif XF (2010)
- MOX6 / MOX8 (2011) - with the sound engine and sample-ROM from Motif XS, half polyphony, no sampler
- MX49 / MX61 (2012) - successor to MM6/MM8, with more than 1000 sounds from Motif XS
- MOXF6 / MOXF8 (2013) - sound engine and sample-ROM from Motif XF, optional sample-flash-ROM
- Motif XF6/XF7/XF8 WH (2014) - 40th Anniversary, special edition MOTIF XF white
- MX88 (2017)

Montage series

- Montage 6/7/8 (2016–2023)
- MODX 6/7/8 (2018)
- Montage 6/7/8 WH (2019–2023) - white edition
- MODX+ 6/7/8 (2022)
- Montage M M6/M7/M8x (October 10, 2023)
- MODX M 6/7/8

Others

- QS300 (1995) — music workstation similar to EOSB900, based on QY300+MU50

===== Arranger Workstations =====
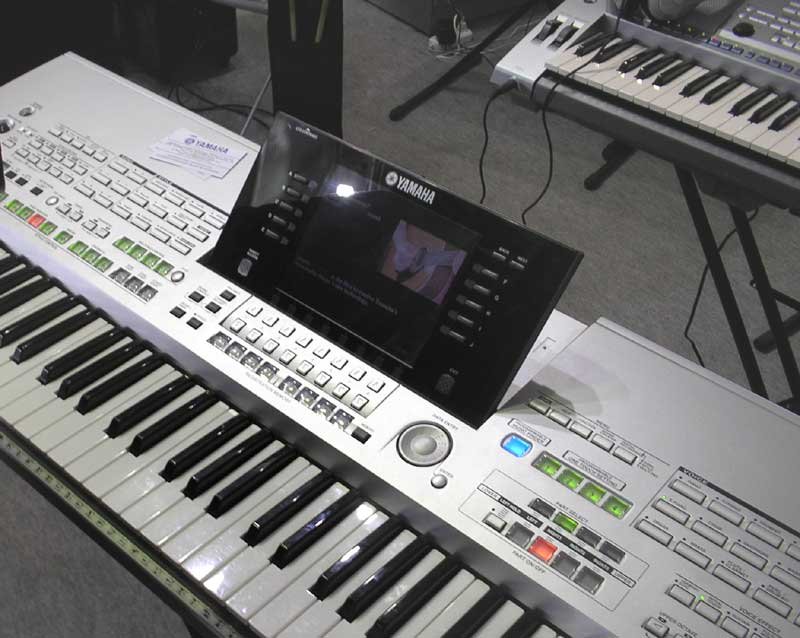
Tyros

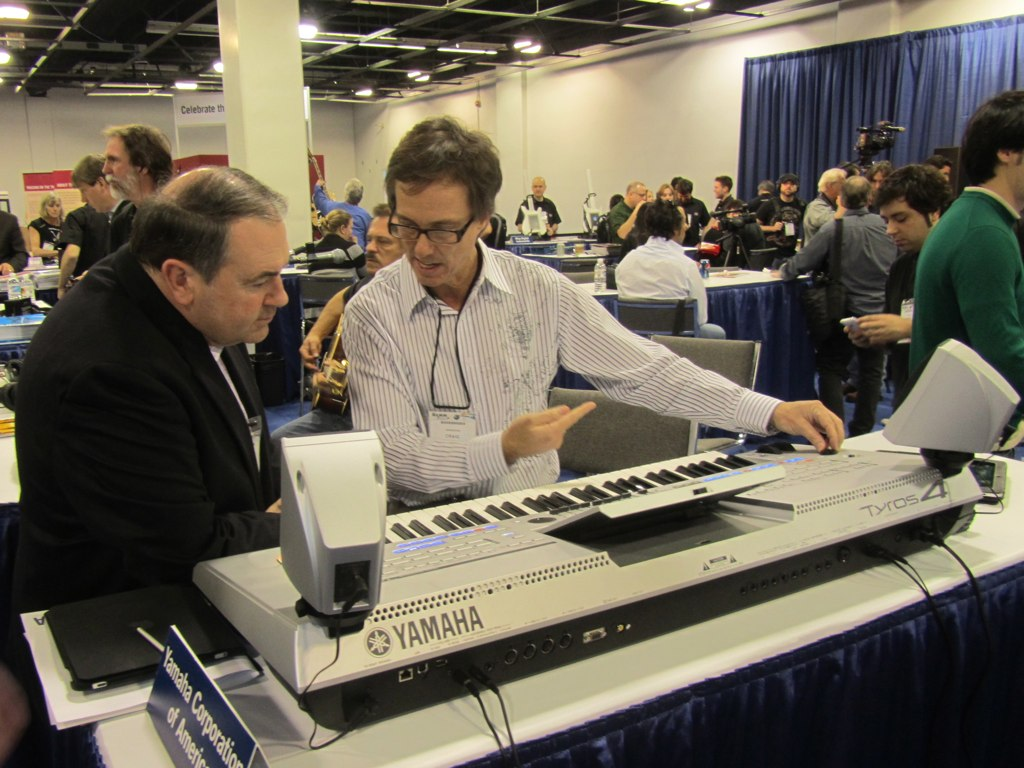
Tyros 4

Tyros series (Combination of the S and SX series) - (Not Continued)

- Tyros (1 May 2002)
- Tyros2 (21 June 2005)
- Tyros3 (17 April 2008)
- Tyros4 (16 June 2010)
- Tyros5 (13 July 2013)

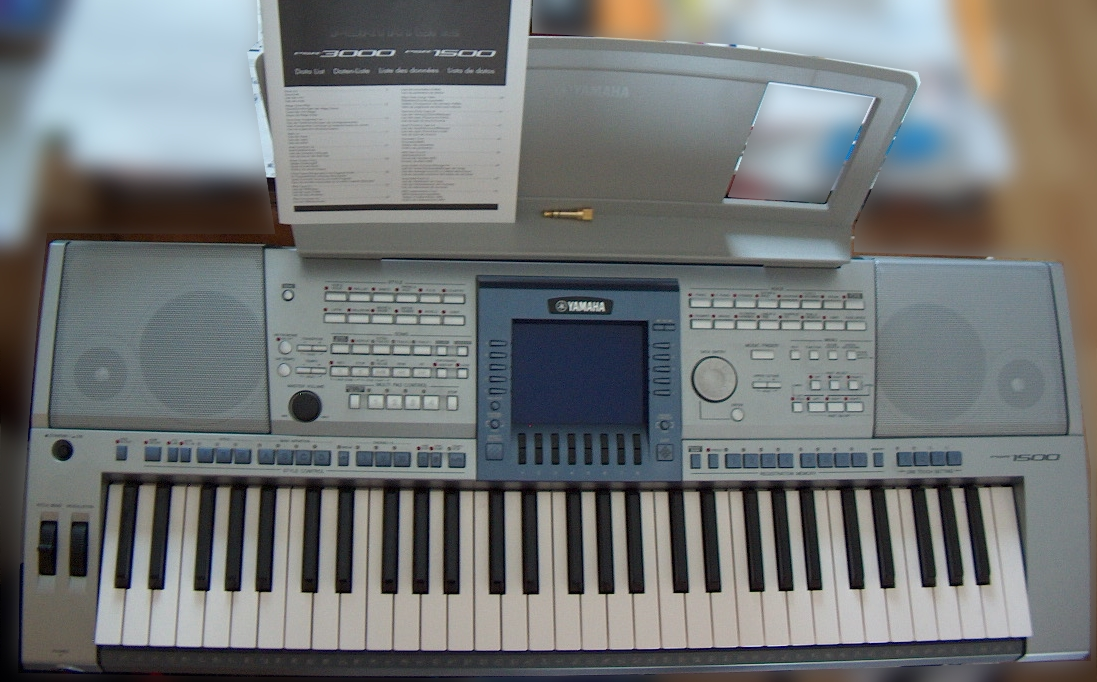
PSR-1500

PSR Arranger Workstations (before PSR-S series)

- PSR-1500 (21 January 2004)
- PSR-3000 (21 January 2004)
- PSR-7000 (1995, export model)
- PSR-6000 (1994)
- PSR-5700
- PSR-8000 (8 September 1997, export model)
- PSR-9000 (9 September 1999, export model)
- PSR-9000 Pro (2000, export model)
- PSR-640
- PSR-1000 (2001, export model)
- PSR-740
- PSR-1100 (2002, export model)
- PSR-2000 (2001, export model)
- PSR-2100 (2002, export model)

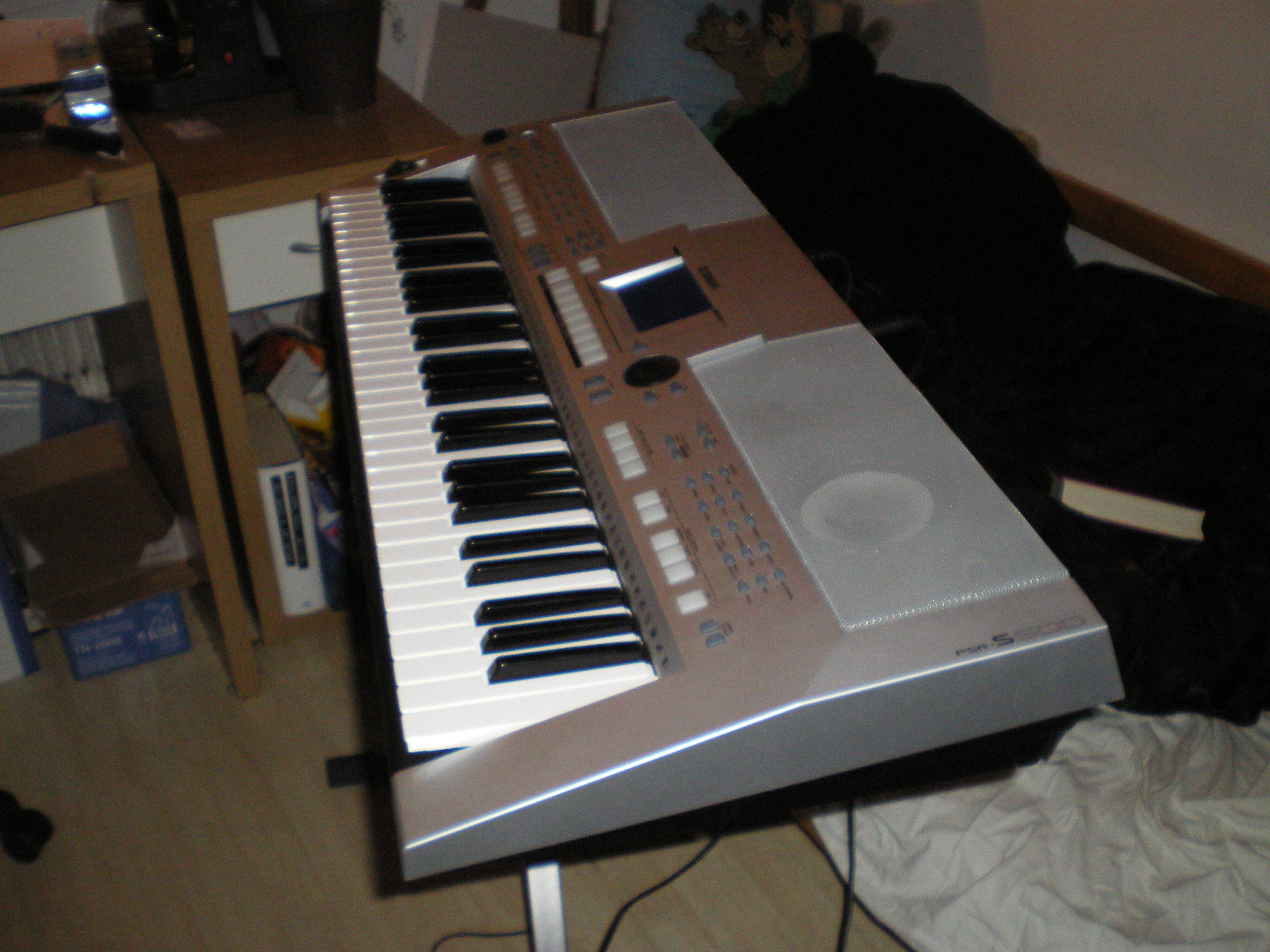
PSR-S500

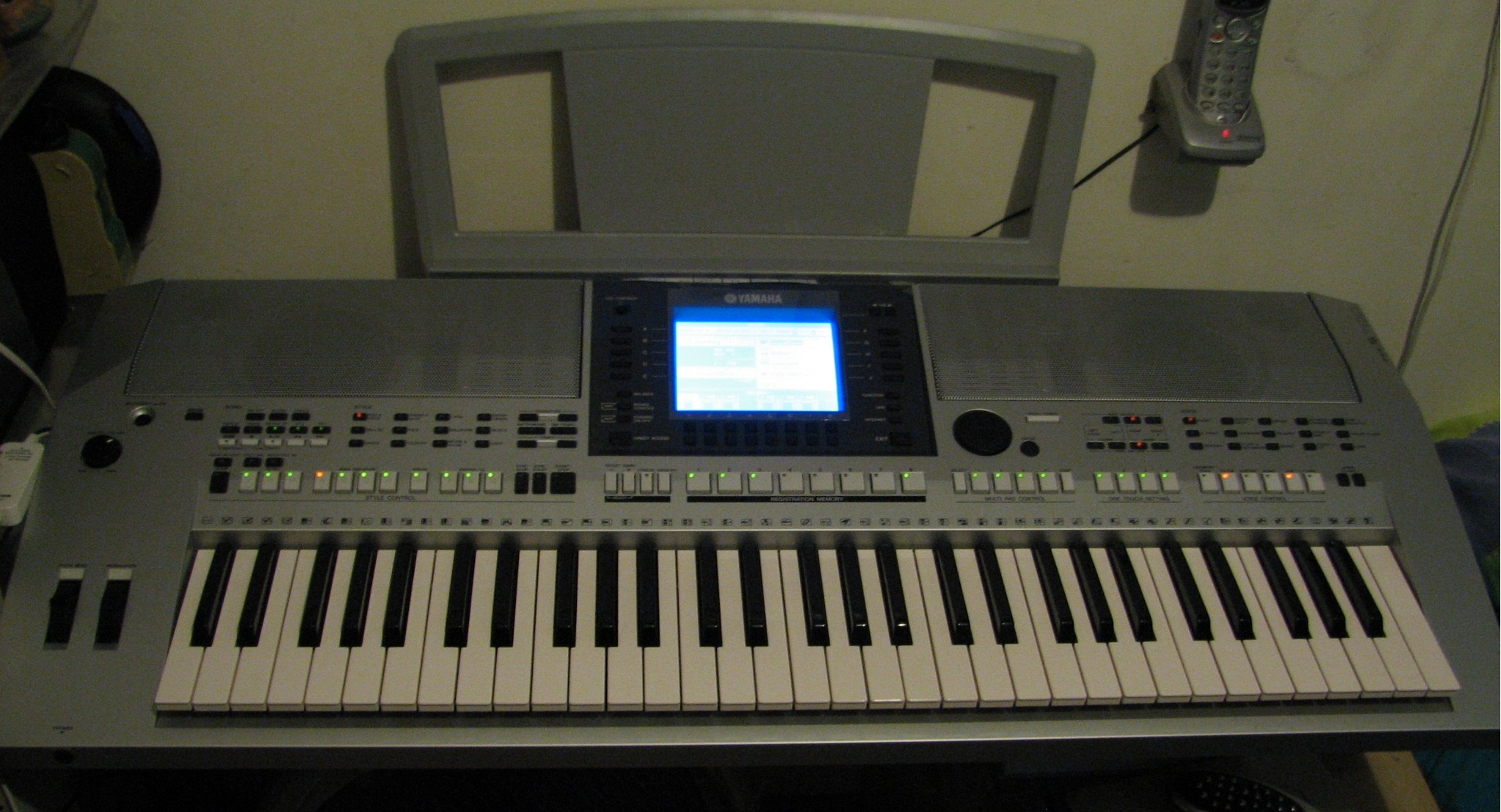
PSR-S700

PSR-S Series - (S and SX series based on Tyros series)

- PSR-S500 (18 July 2006)
- PSR-S550Si/PSR-S550Bl (April 22, 2008) (The S550Si was exported in many countries as a silver version of the Black S550)
- PSR-S650 (13 September 2010)
- PSR-S700 (8 May 2006)
- PSR-S710 (5 February 2009)
- PSR-S900 (8 May 2006)
- PSR-S910 (5 February 2009)
- PSR-S750 (26 April 2012)
- PSR-S950 (26 April 2012)
- PSR-S670 (25 February 2015)
- PSR-S770 (25 February 2015)
- PSR-S970 (25 February 2015)
- PSR-S775 (1 January 2018)
- PSR-S975 (1 January 2018)

PSR-SX Series (The series that replaces the PSR-S series. Uses Genos OS)

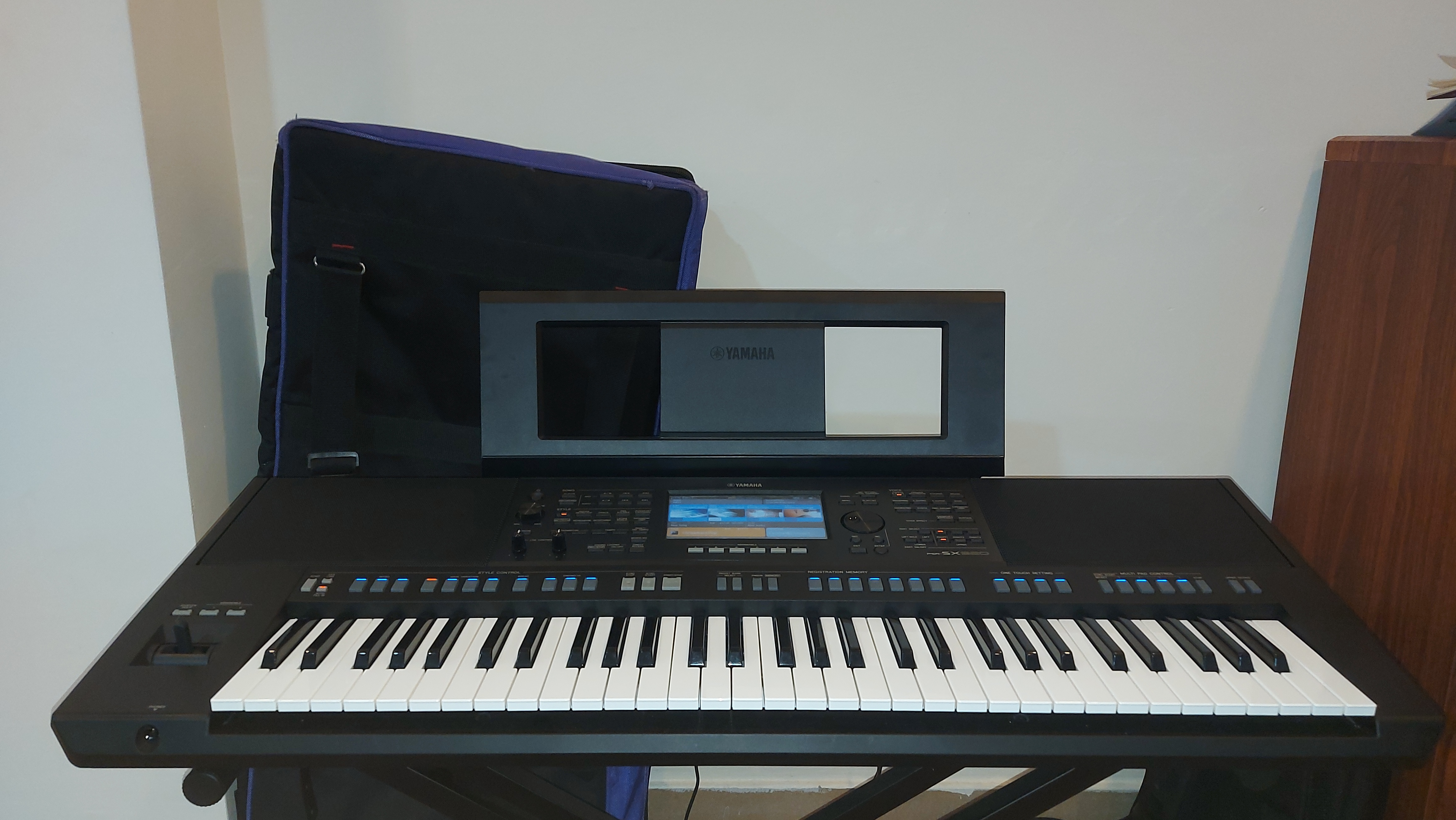
PSR-SX920

- PSR-SX900 - (1 June 2019)
- PSR-SX700 (1 June 2019)
- PSR-SX600 (13 September 2020) - (Successor to the PSR-S670)
- PSR-SX720 (10 September 2024)
- PSR-SX920 - Similar to a Genos, but missing 84% of Super Articulation 2 voices (10 September 2024)
- PSR-SX720+ (April 2026, with Bluetooth Audio)
- PSR-SX620 (21 August 2026)

Genos series (The successor series to the Tyros and the original PSR-SX series)

- Genos (31 August 2017)
- Genos2 (15 November 2023)

Regional Specific Arranger Workstations

- PSR-A1000 (2002, Oriental version of Yamaha PSR-1000)
- PSR-OR700 (2007, Oriental version of Yamaha PSR-S700)
- PSR-A2000 (2012, Oriental model and black version of Yamaha PSR S710. And the first A series whose Pitch Band and Modulation uses a Joystick)
- PSR-A3000 (2016, Oriental version based on Yamaha PSR-S770 and first A Series to have multiple colours in the board)
- PSR-A5000 (2021, Oriental version still based on Yamaha PSR-S770 sound library. Expansion memory, Audio styles, same as the Yamaha PSR-SX900)
- PSR-A700 (October 28th, 2026, lightweight version of PSR-A5000 that based on PSR-SX620, except for sound library still based on PSR-S770. 700MB expansion memory, Chord Looper, and Bluetooth Audio)

==== Sequencing workstations ====
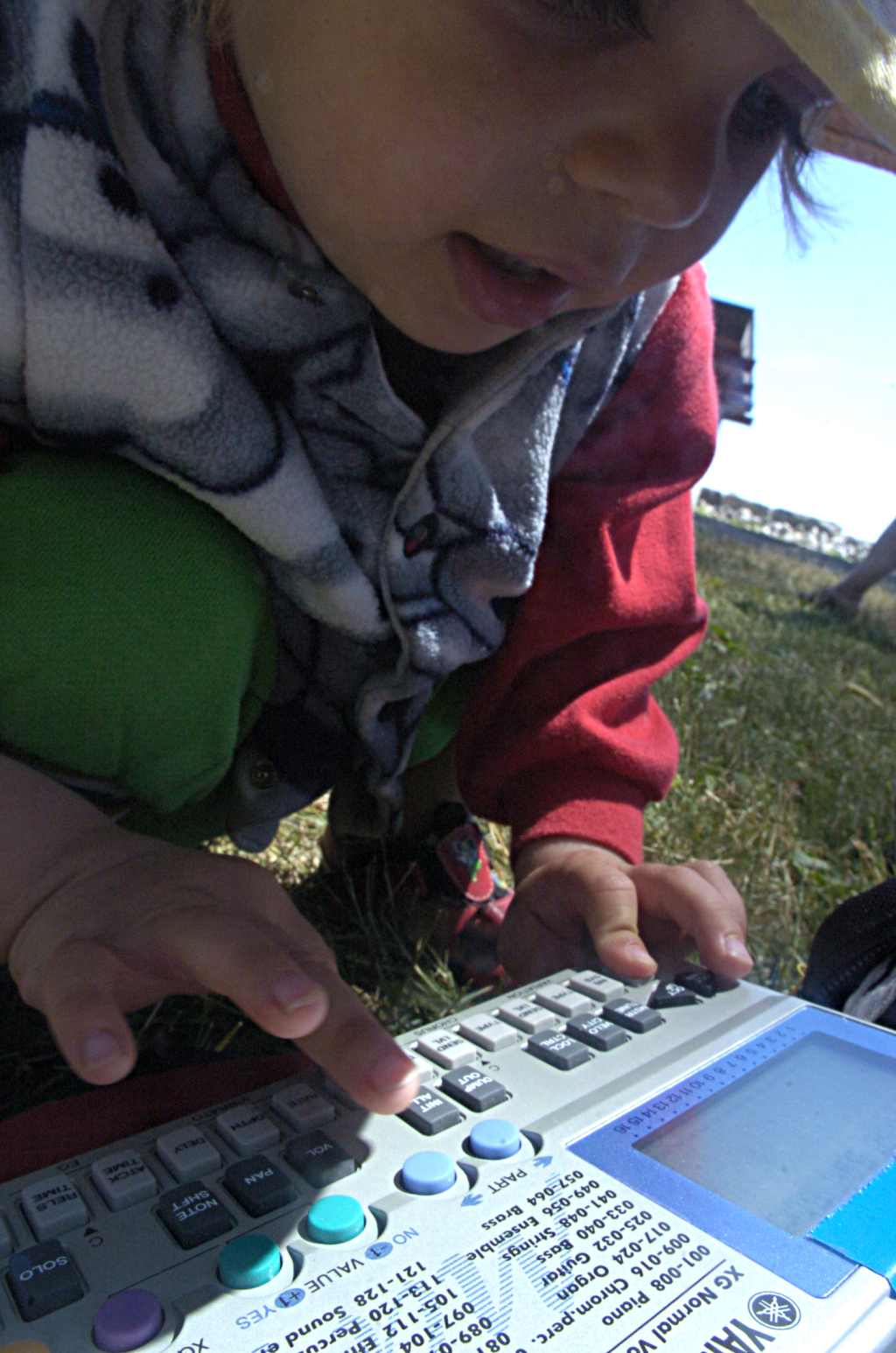
MU15

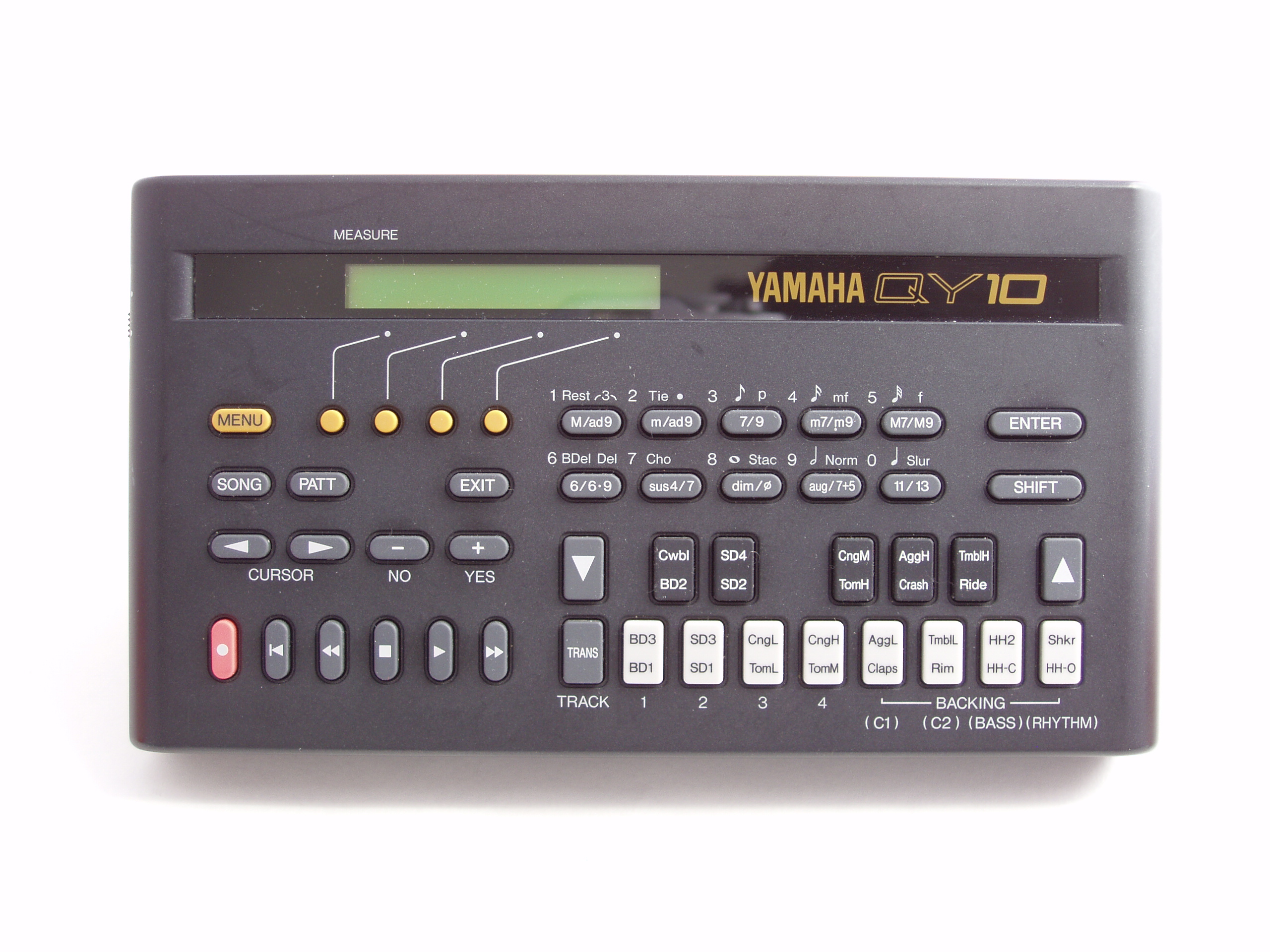
QY10

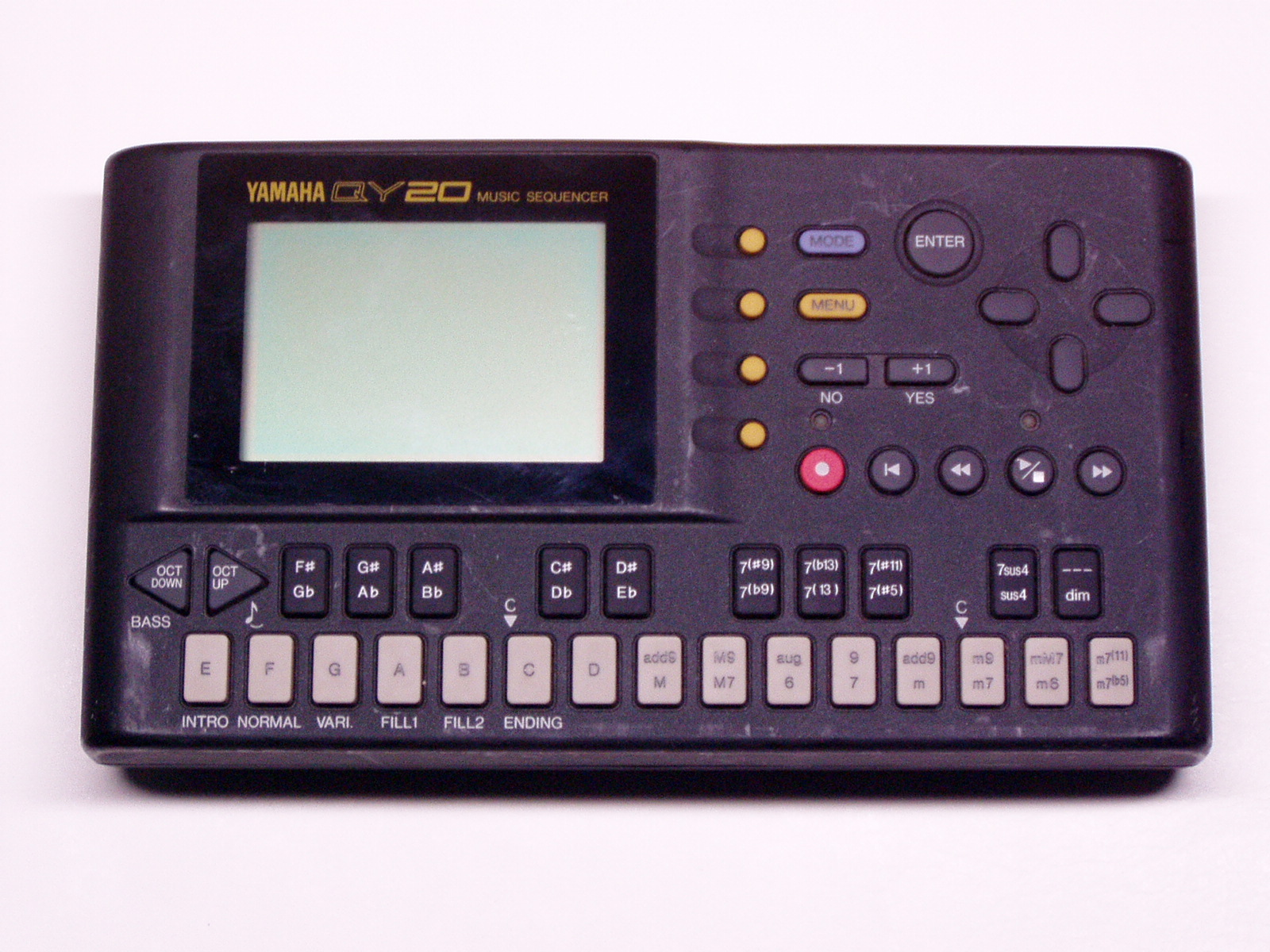
QY20

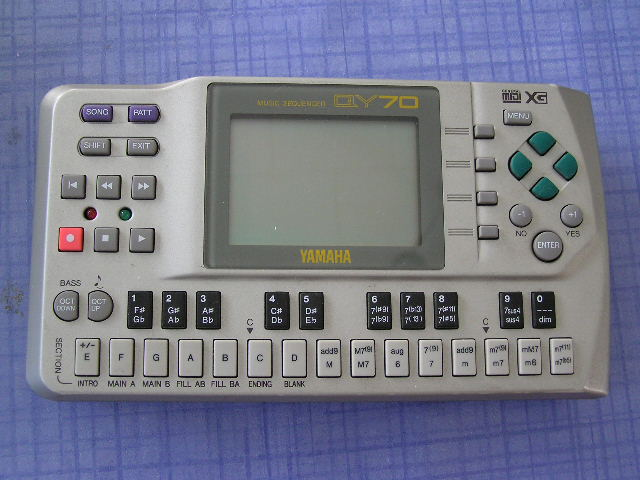
QY70

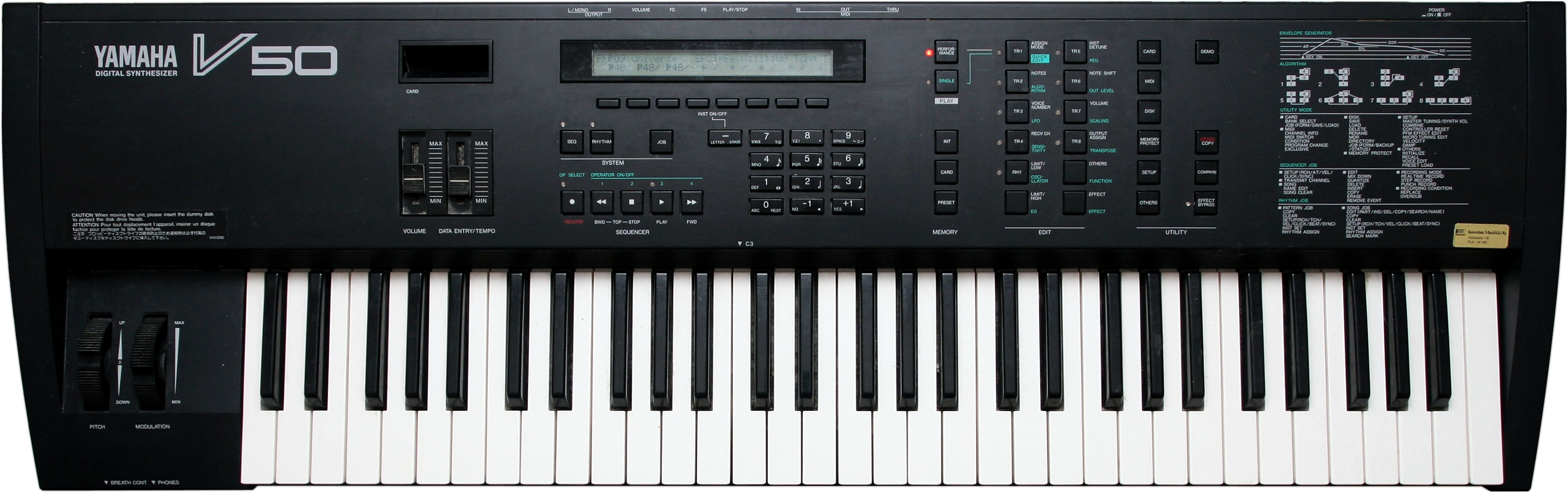
V50

- QR10 (c. 1993, Music Accompaniment Player with sampler and speaker)
- QY8 (1994)
- QY10 (1990)
- QY20 (1992)
- QY22 (1995)
- QY70 (1997)(AWM2 engine)
- QY100 (2000)(AWM2 engine)
- QY300 (c. 1994)
- QY700 (1996)
- V50 (1989)

==== Groove machines ====
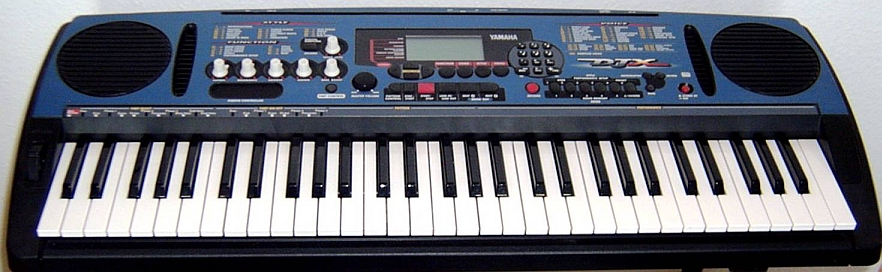
PSR D1-DJX

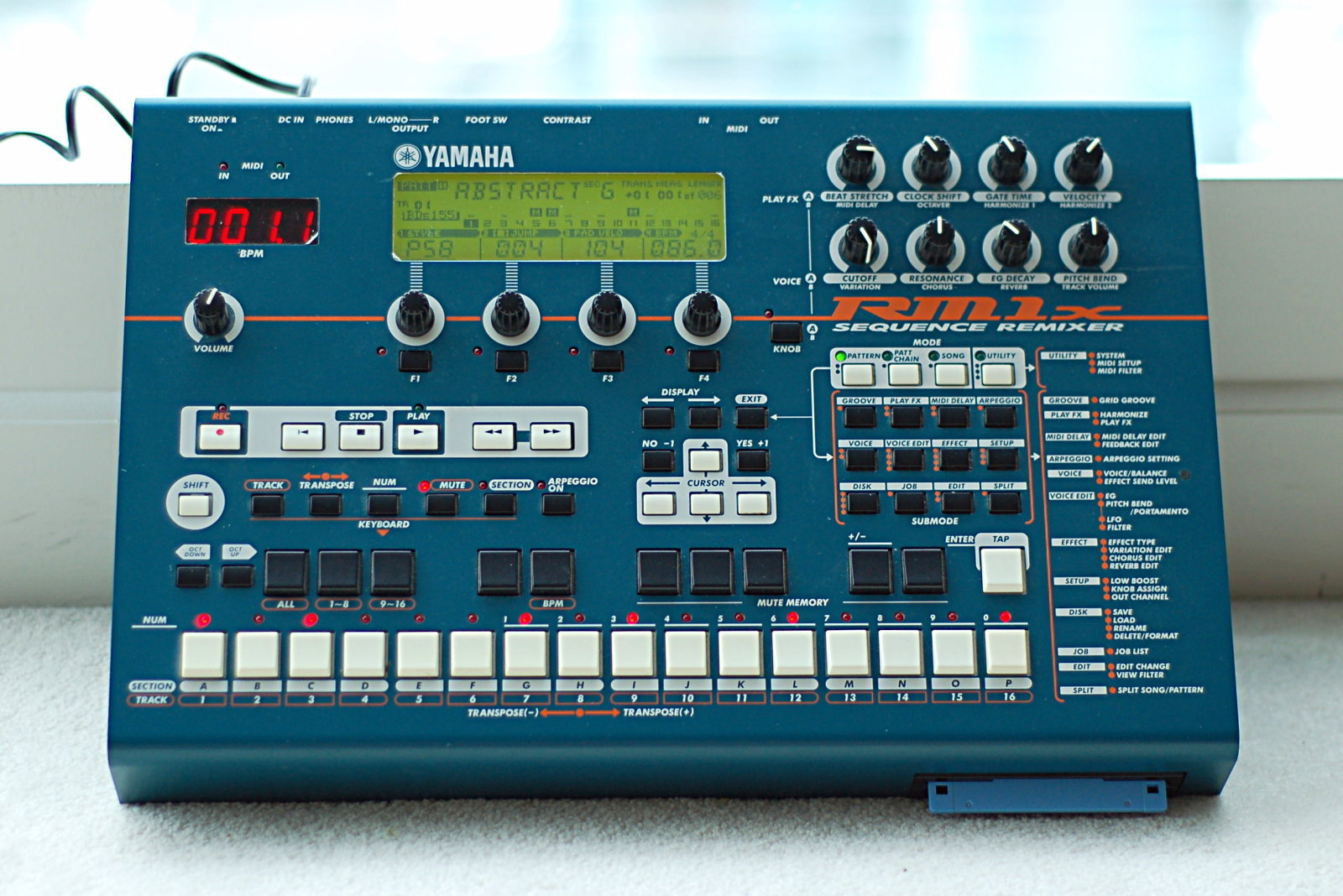
RM1x

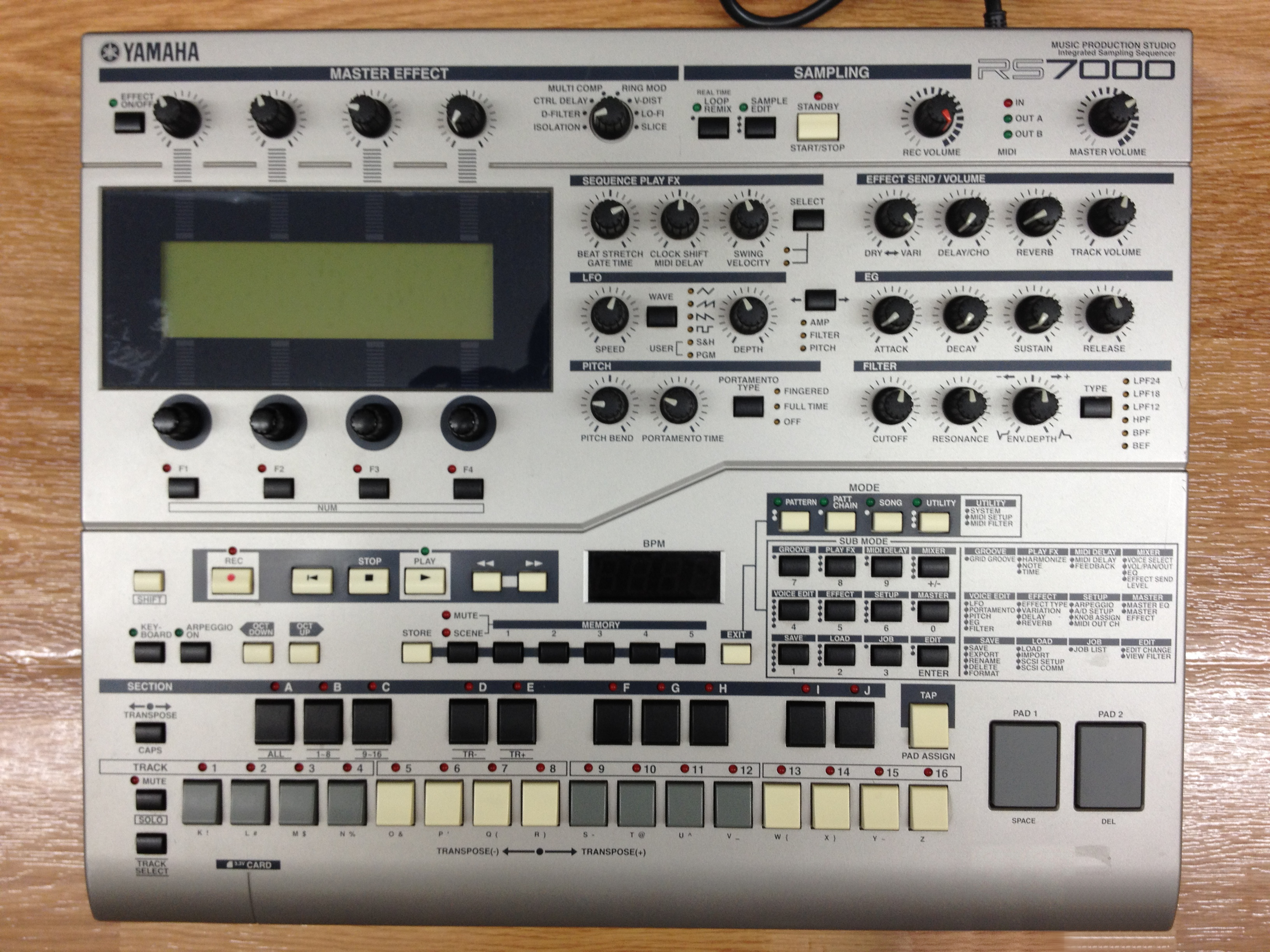
RS7000

- AN200 (2001) — desktop module based on PLG150-AN similar to AN1x, with drum sound and step sequencer.
- DX200 (2001) — desktop module based on PLG150-DX compatible with DX7, with additional filter & envelope, drum sounds and step sequencer.
- PSRD1 / PSR

D1-DJX (1998, DJ keyboard)

- DJX-II / DJX-IIB (2000, DJ keyboard/DJ groove machine)
- RM1x (1998)
- RS7000 (2001)

==== Drum machines ====
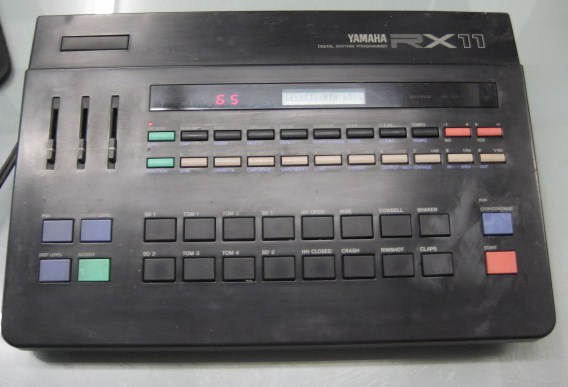
RX11 (1984)

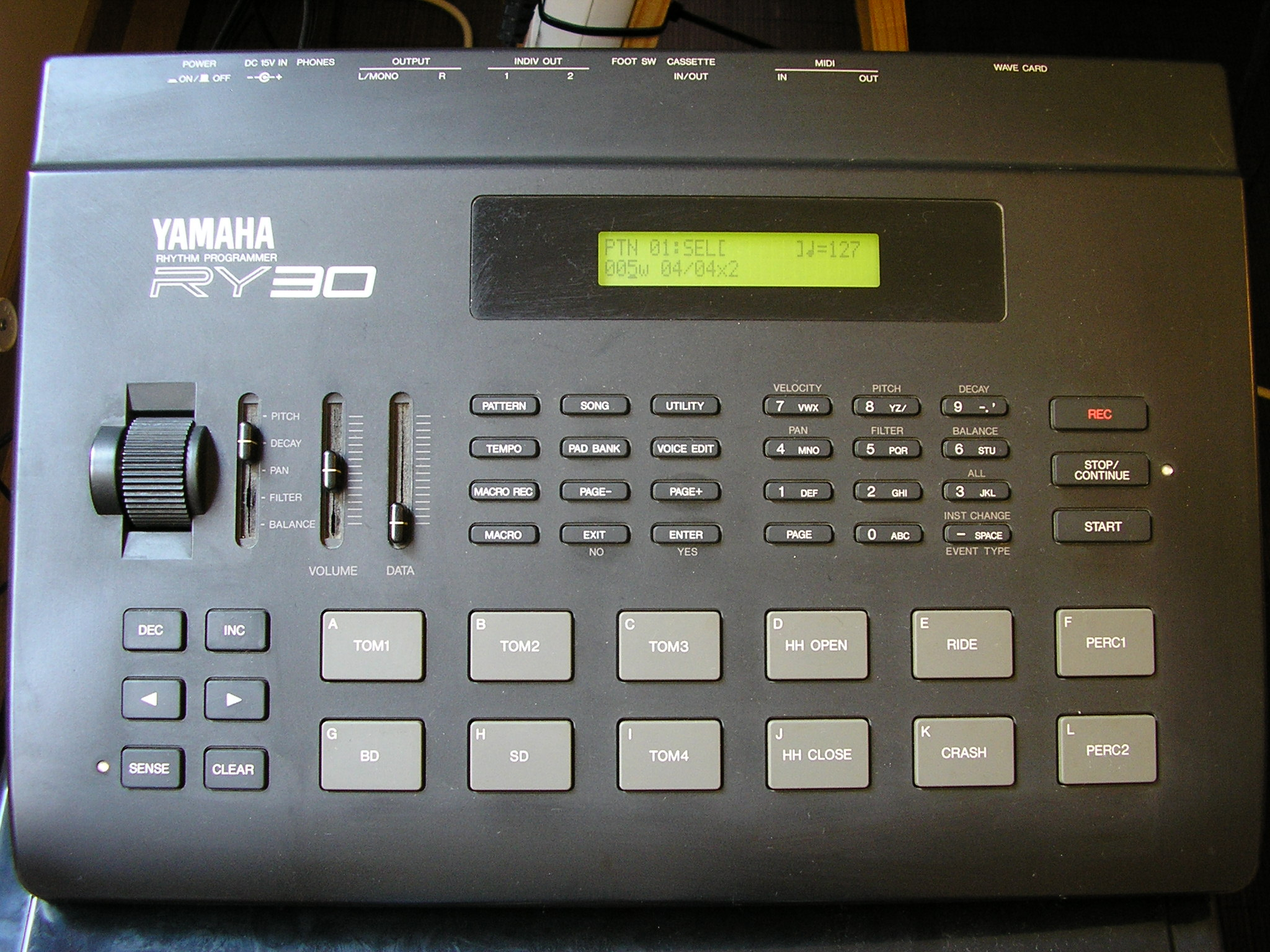
RY30 (1991)

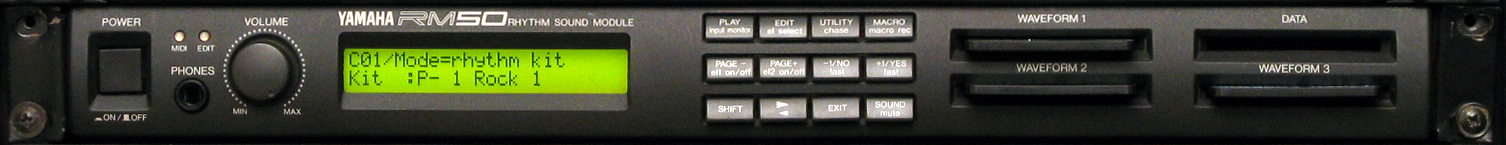
RM50 (1995)

RX series

- RX5 (1986)
- RX7 (1987)
- RX8 (1988, 43 samples)
- RX11 (1984)
- RX15 (1984)
- RX17 (1987)
- RX21 / RX21L (1985, L = Latin percussion)
- RX120 (1988, 38 samples)

RY series

- RY8 (1994)
- RY9 (1999)
- RY10 (1992)
- RY20 (1994)
- RY30 (1991, AWM2(16bit PCM))

RM series

- RM50 (1993) - drum sound module

MR series

- MR10 (1983)

DD series

- DD5 (c. 1989)
- DD10

PTX series

- PTX8 (1986) Percussion Tone Generator

TXM series

- TMX (1992) Drum Trigger Module

==== Samplers ====
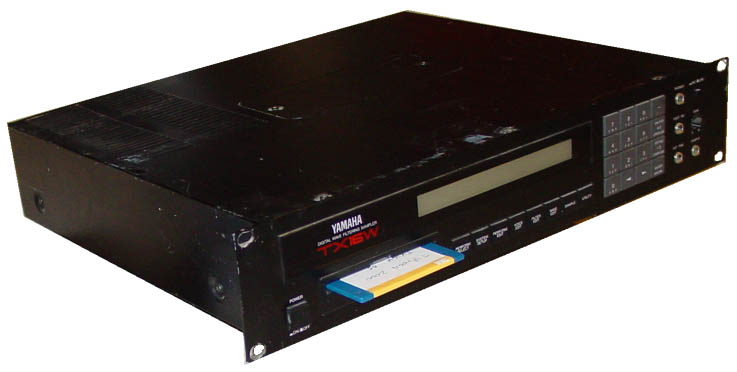
TX16W

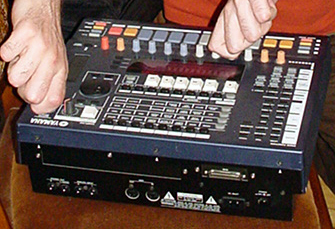
SU700

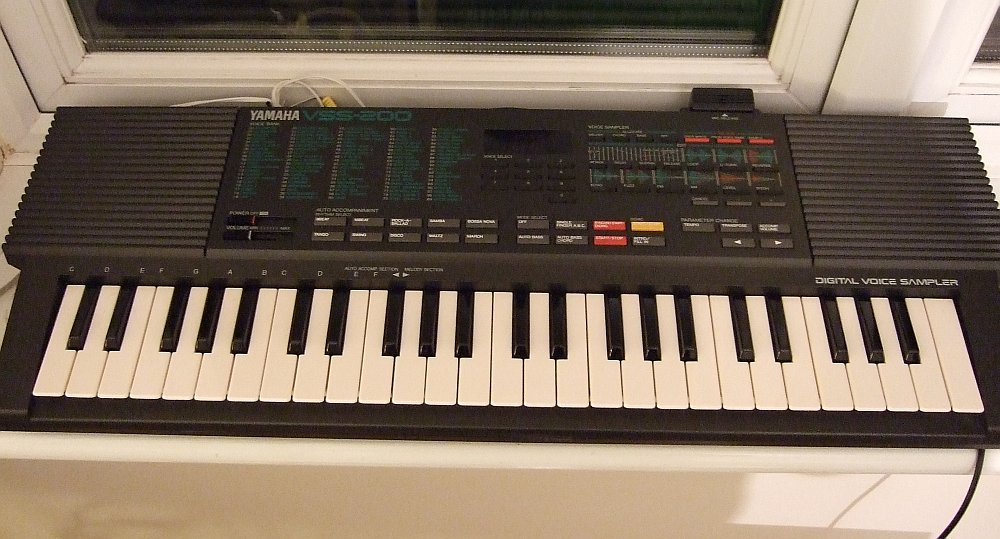
VSS-200

- TX16W (1987)

VSS series (mini keyboard)

- VSS-30 (1987)
- VSS-100 (1985)
- VSS-200 (1988 or 1989)

A series (rack mount)

- A3000 / A3000 ver.2 (1997)
- A4000 (1999)
- A5000 (1999)
- A7000 / A7000 ver.2 (1995)

SU series (desktop module)

- SU10 (1995)
- SU200 (2000)
- SU700 (1998)

==== Sound modules ====
Sound modules that do not fit into other categories

- CBX-T3 — General MIDI and other modes supported (same as TG100, but with LEDs instead of LCD)
- FB-01 (1986) — 4op FM/8 multi-timbral sound module, suitable for CX5M system. a forerunner of TG & MU series
- FS1R (1998) — FM/Formant synthesis
- MU5 (1994) — General MIDI desktop sound module, not XG-compatible.
- TG100 (1991) — General MIDI sound module
- TG300 / TG300GRAY (1993/1994) — PCM, GS compatible
- TG500 (1992) — 19" rack version of the SY85.
- TX1P (1987, piano)

===== XG tone generators =====
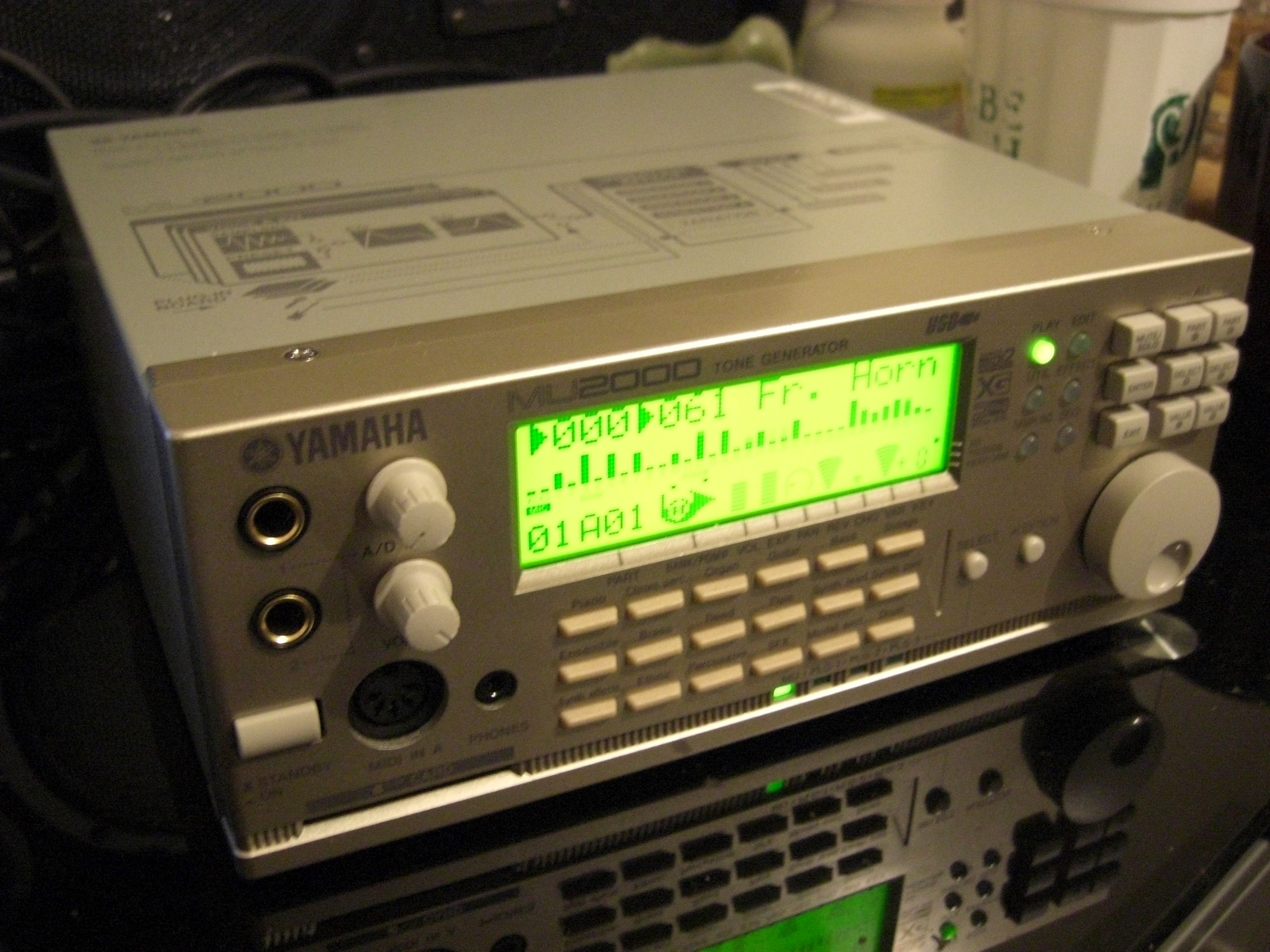
MU2000

- MU10 (1996) — Desktop unit, no LCD.
- MU15 (1995) — Desktop unit.
- MU50 (1995) — Half-rack unit.
- MU80 (1994) — Half-rack unit.
- MU90 (1996) — Half-rack unit.
- MU90B (1996) — Half-rack unit, no LCD or buttons.
- MU90R (1996) — 19" rackmount version.
- MU100 (1997) — Half-rack unit, one PLG slot.
- MU100B (1998) — Half-rack unit, no LCD or buttons, one PLG slot.
- MU100Bs (1998) — Silver-finished MU100B.
- MU100R (1997) — 19" rackmount version, two PLG slots pre-configured with PLG100-VH and PLG100-VL.
- MU128 (1998) — Double height half-rack unit, three PLG slots
- MU500 (2000) — Half-rack unit, no LCD or buttons.
- MU1000 (1999) — Double height half-rack unit, three PLG slots.
- MU1000 EX (2000) — Firmware update with new effects, licensed GS mode.
- MU2000 (1999) — Double height half-rack unit, three PLG slots, basic sampling and MIDI recording/playback.
- MU2000 EX (2000) — Firmware update with new effects, licensed GS-mode.

==== Wave Blaster compatible plug-in boards ====
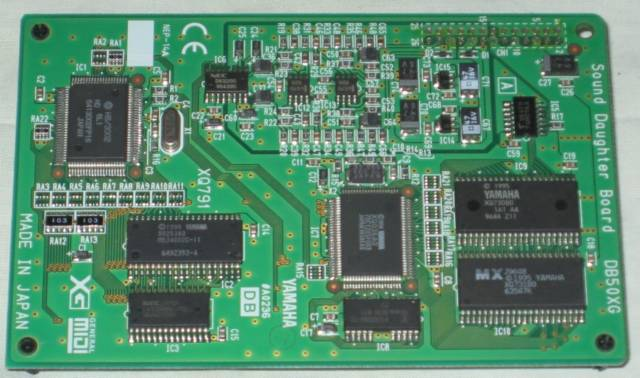
DB50XG XG daughter-board for Wave Blaster port

- DB50XG (1995) — XG-compatible daughter-board for Wave Blaster port.
- DB51XG (1998?) — Updated DB50XG with smaller footprint, main processor is XU94700.
- DB60XG (?) — A DB50XG with audio-input. Japan only, not sold separately.
- NEC XR385 (?) — OEM/Licensed version of the DB60XG.

==== XG Plug-in System ("Plug for XG") expansion boards ====
For the PLG slots in compatible synthesizers.

- PLG100-DX (1998) — Plug-in board version of DX7
- PLG100-SG (1997) — Formant Singing synthesizer, forerunner of Vocaloid
- PLG100-VH (1998) — Vocoder/harmonizer effect board
- PLG100-VL (1998) — Plug-in board version of Vl70m, similar to VA algorithm on EX5.
- PLG100-XG (1999) — XG soundset, equivalent to the MU50 but without its TG300B mode.

==== Modular Synthesis Plug-in System ("MSPS") expansion boards ====
For the PLG slot in compatible synthesizers. With internal bulk function for the host synthesizer to recall user patches.

- PLG150-AN (1999) — Analog physical modeling synthesis, similar to AN1x.
- PLG150-AP (2004) — Multisampled Yamaha CFIIIS grand concert piano.
- PLG150-DR (2002) — Drum kits, equivalent to a drum part on the Motif.
- PLG150-DX (1999) — Updated PLG100-DX.
- PLG150-PC (2002) — Percussion kits, based on Latin Groove Factory/Q Up Arts
- PLG150-PF (1999) — Piano sounds.
- PLG150-VL (1999) — Updated PLG100-VL.

==== Software synthesizers ====
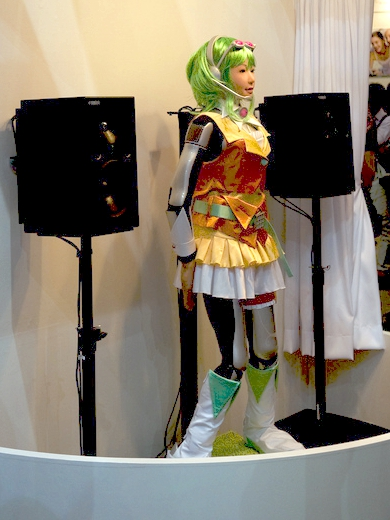
VOCALOID demo - collaborating with HRP-4C Miim by AIST

- BODiBEAT
- MIDPLUG (1997)
- S-YG20
- S-YXG50 (1997)
- S-YXG70
- S-YXG100
- S-YXG100 PVL
- VOCALOID
- VOCALOID2
- VOCALOID3
- VOCALOID4
- VOCALOID5
- VOCALOID6

==== MIDI controllers ====
KX series

- KX25 (2008)
- KX49 (2008)
- KX61 (2008)
- KX8 (2008, GHS action)
- KX76 (1985, initial/after touch)
- KX88 (1984, piano touch, initial/after touch)

CBX series

- CBX-K1 / CBX-K1XG (1995, XG = XG sound)
- CBX-K2 (1998)
- CBX-K3 (1993)

===== Keytars =====
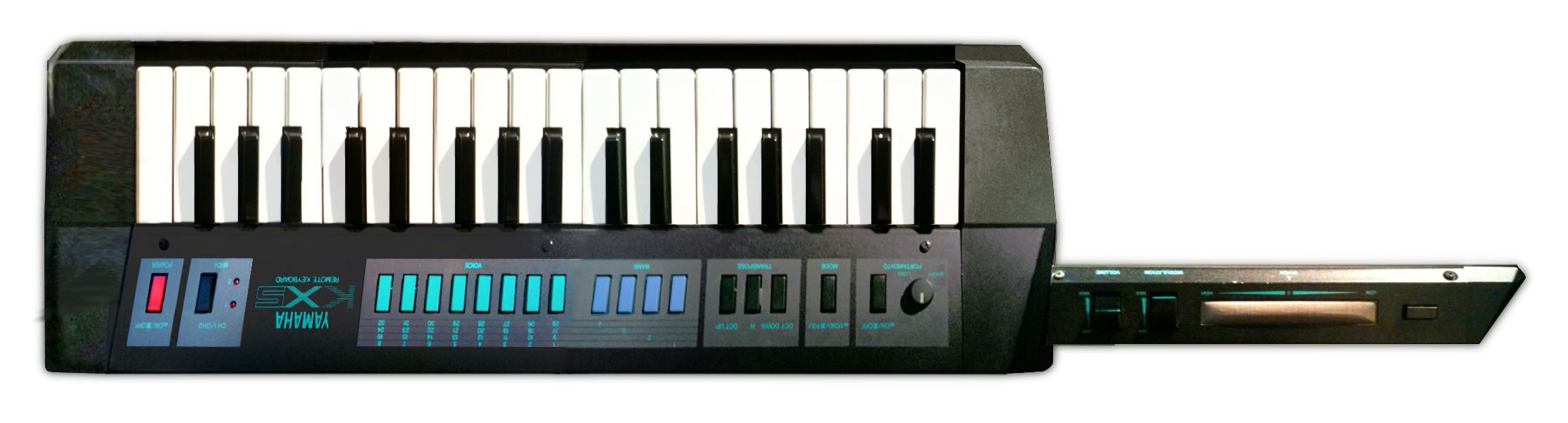
KX5

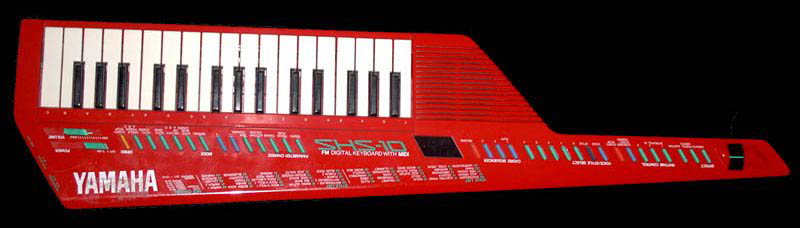
SHS-10

- CS-01 (1982, shoulder analog synth with breath controller)
- KX-1 (1983)
- KX-5 (1984)
- SHS-10[R][S][B] (1987/1988, FM & MIDI, similar to PSS-390, R = red, S = silver, B = black (1988))
- SHS-200 (1988)

===== Guitar synthesizers =====
- G10 (1988, guitar MIDI Controller (using super sonic sensor)/Sound module, compatible with TX802/TX81Z)
- G1D (1996, HEX pickup)
- G50 (1996, guitar MIDI converter for G1D/B1D/B5D)
- B1D / B5D (1997/?, bass HEX pickup)

EZ series guitar style

- EZ-EG (2002 or 2003, EZ series, electric guitar style, 6strings, 12frets)
- EZ-AG (2003 or 2005, EZ series, acoustic guitar style, 6strings, 12frets)

===== Wind controllers =====
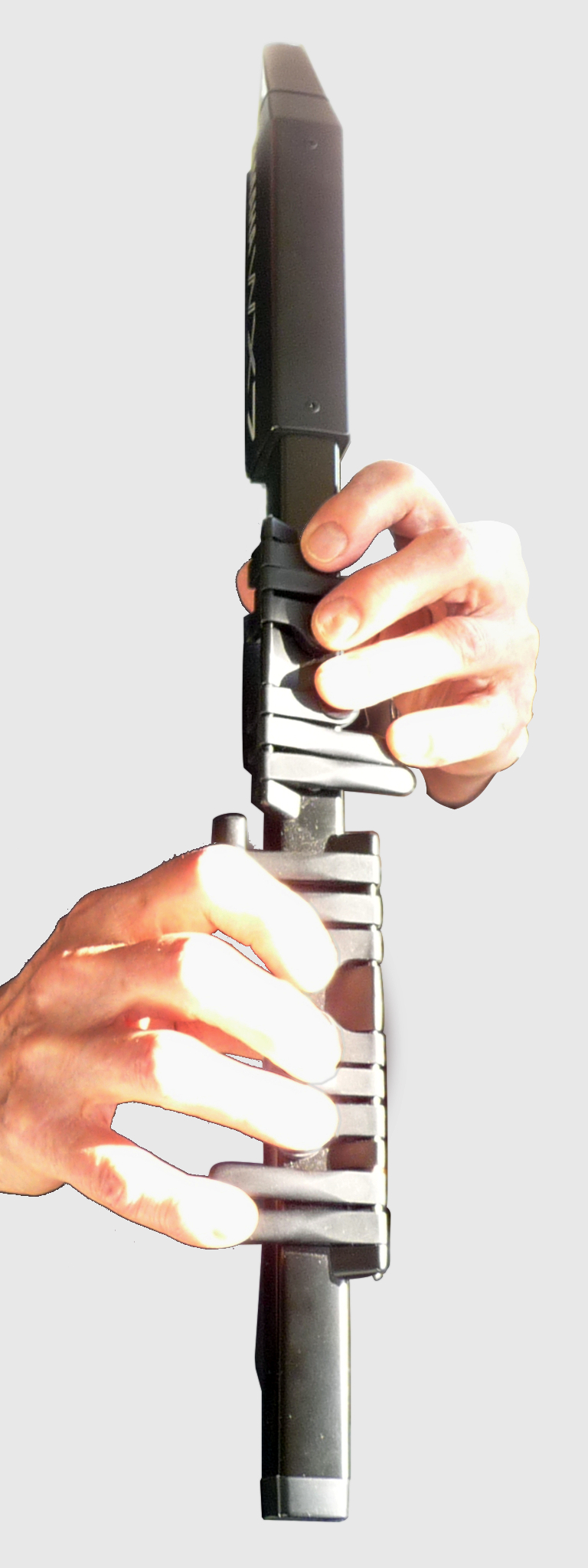
WX7 wind controller (with hands of player)

====== WX series ======
- WX5 (1998)
- WX7 (1987)
- WX11 / WT11 (1988, Wind controller/sound module)

The Yamaha WX5, WX7, and WX11 are models of monophonic MIDI wind controller musical instruments manufactured by the Yamaha Corporation that have since been discontinued. The fingering system is based on the saxophone basic fingering. Like a keyboard controller, wind controllers send MIDI note information electronically to an external sound module or tone generator which in turn synthesizes a tremendous variety of musical tones. Unlike a keyboard controller which is usually polyphonic, a wind controller is monophonic. The only limits to the kinds of sounds available are the limitations of the external module/tone generator, not the WX5 itself. A WX5 performer can sound like any melodic instrument: wind, string, percussion, keyboard, or purely electronic, including special sound effects. In addition most tone generators a mix of instruments can be programmed.

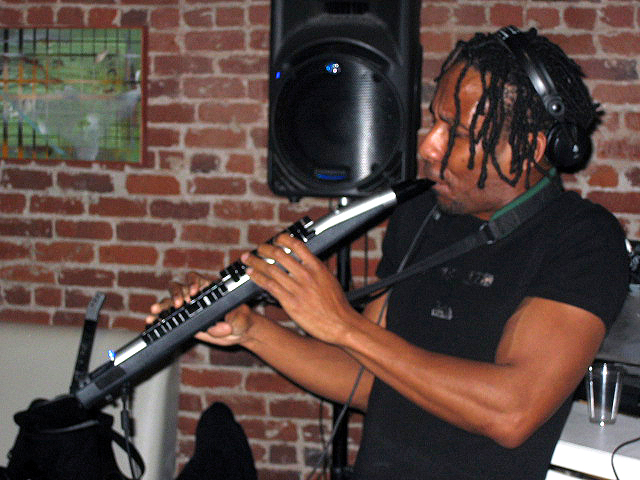
Yamaha WX5

The WX5 wind controller simulates a wind instrument because of the way it is played, the key layout, and because it responds to breath (wind) pressure as well as lip pressure on a simulated reed mouthpiece similar to that of a saxophone or clarinet. The wind and lip pressure information is converted to MIDI data which is interpreted by the external sound module. Usually the wind pressure is interpreted as loudness and lip pressure is interpreted as pitch bend; thus, the instrument responds much like an acoustic wind instrument and extremely realistic musical phrasing is available to the player.

The WX5 has a 16-key layout similar to a standard saxophone. It also includes a built-in MIDI output connector, a dedicated connector and cable for direct connections to Yamaha WX-Series tone generators, a high-resolution wind sensor, and a thumb-controlled pitch bend wheel. Yamaha recommend that this device be used with the Yamaha VL70m Virtual Acoustic Tone Generator.

The WX7 was the first model that Yamaha produced, beginning in 1987. This was followed by the WX11 in 1988, and then the WX5 in 1998. The WX5 was discontinued in October 2017.

====== References ======
- Electric Wind Music
- MIDI Electronic Wind Instrument: A Study of the Instrument and Selected Works

====== EZ series wind instruments ======
- EZ-TP (2004, EZ series, trumpet style, 3valves)

====== Breath controllers ======
- BC2
- BC3

===== Tenori-on =====
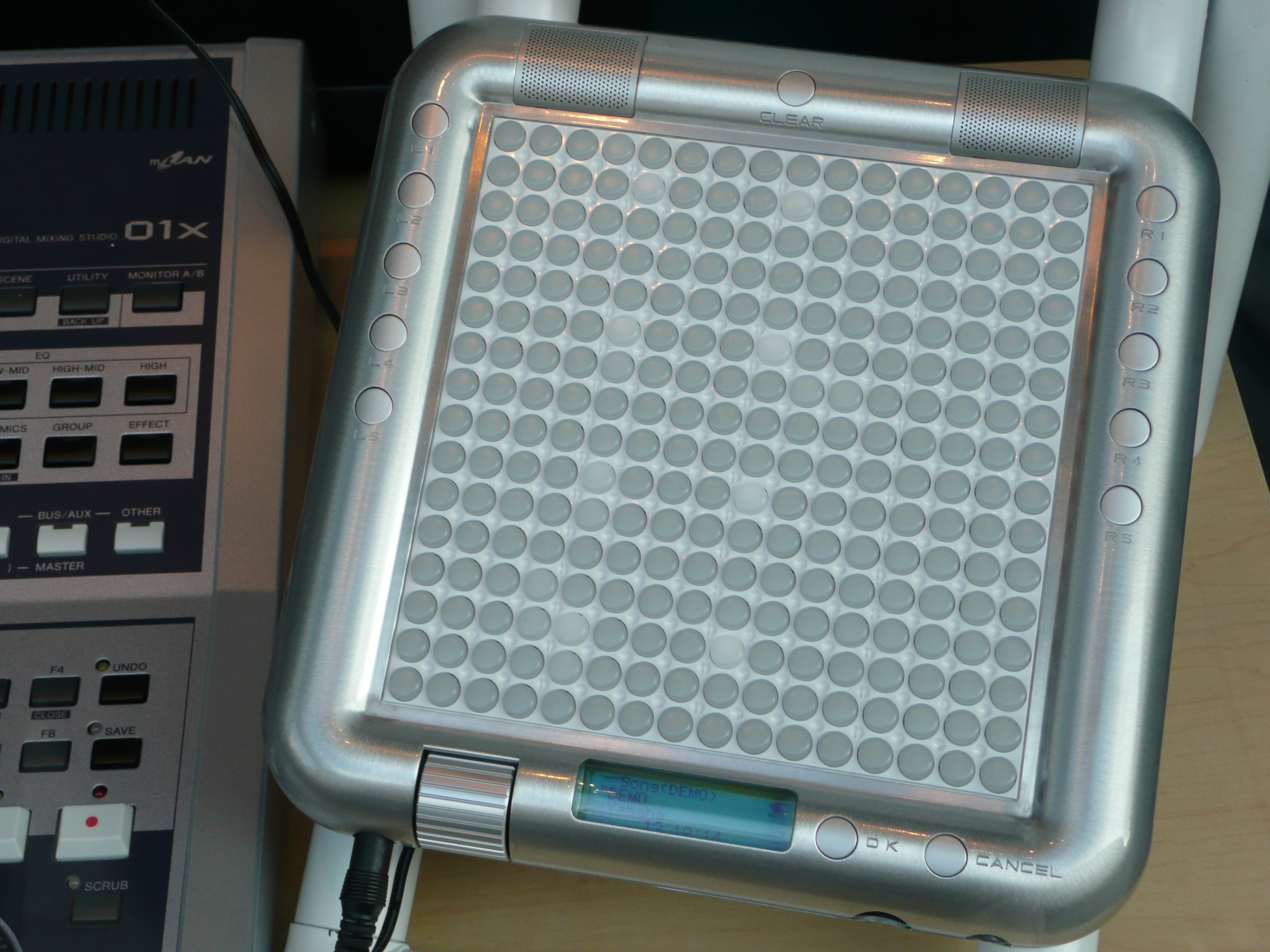
Tenori-on TNR-W

- TNR-W (2008, white LED buttons)
- TNR-O (2009, orange LED buttons)

===== Wearable Instruments =====
- Miburi (1995)

==== Interfaces ====
===== MIDI interfaces =====
- UX16
- UX96
- UX256
- MI-3100 for the Toshiba 3100

===== MIDI effects =====
- MEP4 (c. 1988) MIDI Event Processor

===== MLAN =====
- mLAN8P
- mLAN8E
- mLAN16E
- mLAN-EX
- i88X

==== Music sequencers ====
- QX1 (1984)
- QX3 (1987)
- QX5 / QX5FD (1986/1988 or 1989)
- QX7 (1985)
- QX21 (1985)

===== Music data recorders =====
Data recorders for player pianos, digital pianos, Electones, and more
MDF series
MIDI Data Filer

- MDF1 (1986, media: 2.8-inch Quick Disk)
- MDF2 (media: 3.5-inch 2D FD)
- MDF3 (media: 3.5-inch 2HD FD)

DSR series

- DSR-1 (1987, digital sequencer recorder)

MDR series

- MDR-1
- MDR3
- MDR4
- MDR-10

===== Music data player =====
- MDP-30 (2008, music data player for accompaniment/lesson, PCM sound:XG/GM2/GS, USB memory/USB FDD ready)

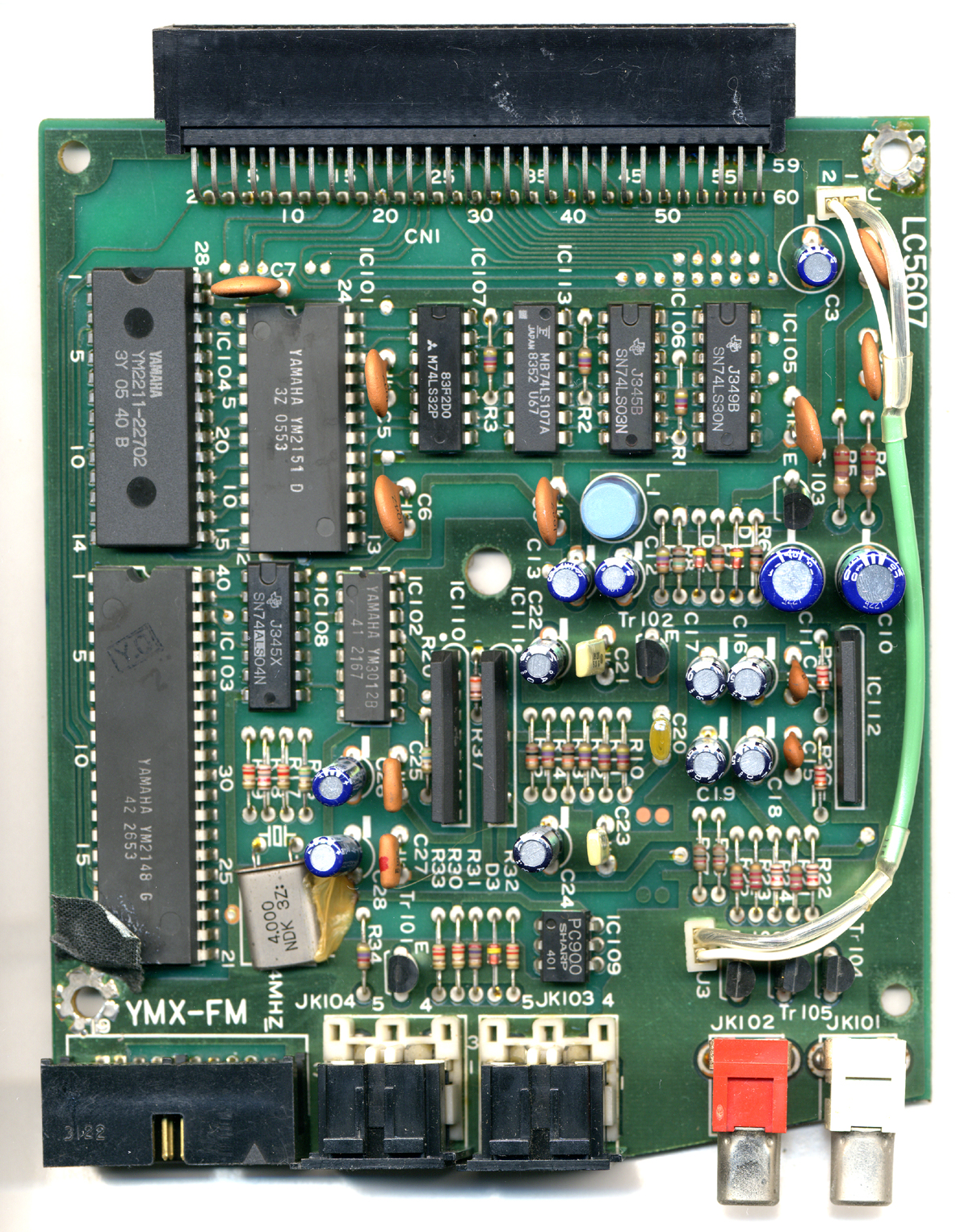
SFG-01 FM synthesizer unit

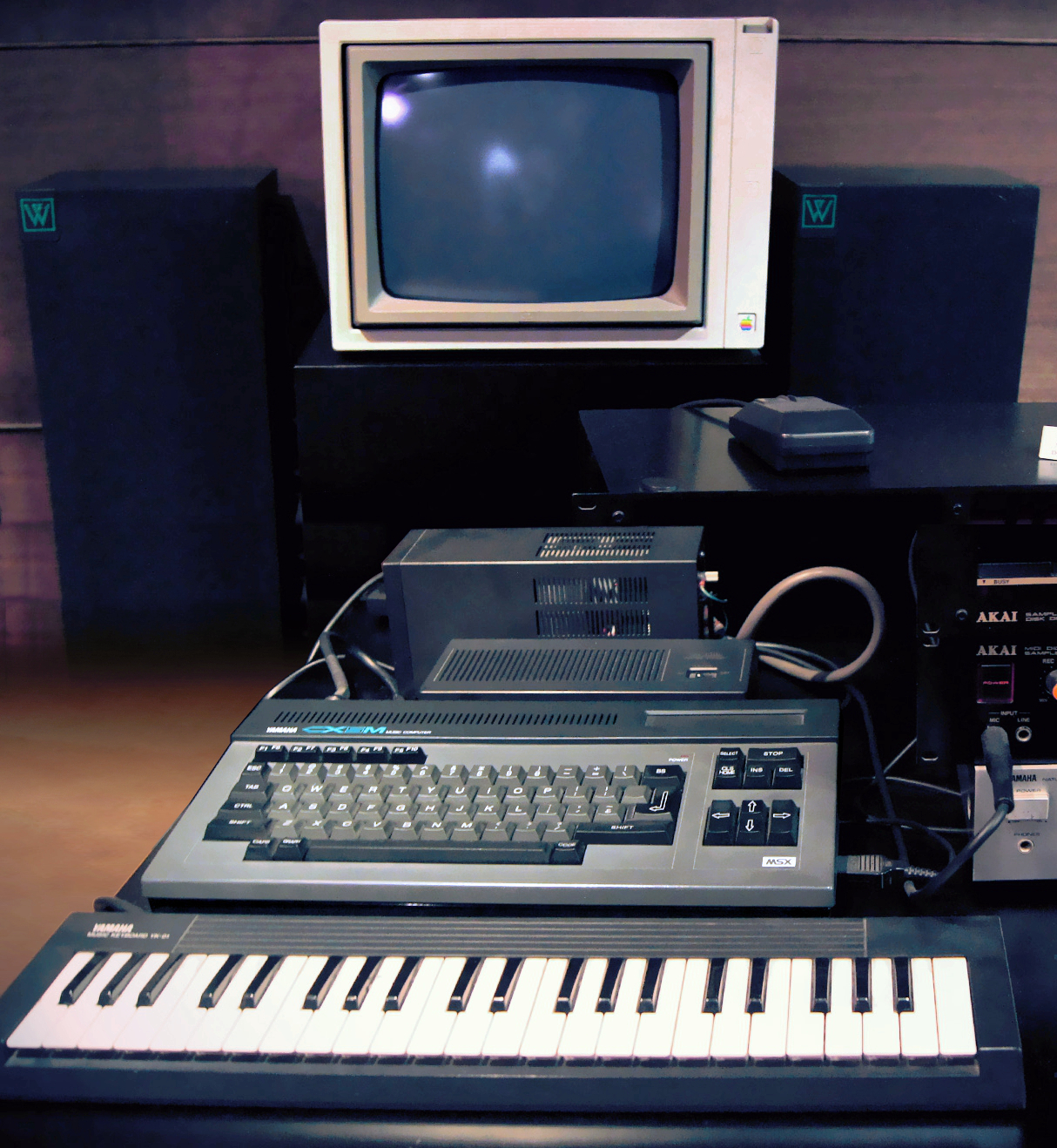
CX5M

==== Music computers ====
- C1 / C1/20 (1987) — IBM PC compatible laptop PC for music production (i286@10 MHz), with 8 MIDI ports and Voyetra sequencer. /20 = 20M HD
- CX5M / CX5F (1984) — MSX computer for music production, with SFG-01 FM synthesizer unit including MIDI I/O
- CX7M/128 (1985)— successor of CX5M, MSX2 version, with SFG-05 FM synthesizer unit

==== Sequencing software ====
- XGworks V1.0 (1996) — For Windows 95 (p/n: MA-61W).
- XGworks V2.0 (1997) — For Windows 95 (p/n: MA-62W). Distributed worldwide with the SW1000XG sound card.
- XGworks V3.0 (1998) — For Windows 95 (p/n: MA-63W) or MAC OS8 (p/n: MA-63M).
- XGworks V4.0 (1999) — For Windows 95/NT4 (p/n: MA-64W), Japan only.
- SOL (2001) — For Windows 98/XP (p/n: MA-161W), Japan only.
- SQ01 (2001) —For Windows 98/XP. Light version of SOL, distributed worldwide with Yamaha synthesizers.
- SOL2 (2003) — For Windows 98/XP (p/n: MA-162W), Japan only.
- SQ01 V2 (2003) — For Windows 98/XP.
- XGworks ST (2003) — For Windows 98/XP (p/n: MA-65W). Based on SOL2, Japan only.

==== Computer music packages ====
Hello! Music!
computer music packages comprises CBX hardware and software (XGworks, etc.)

- CBX-101 (1992)
- CBX-201 (1992)
- CBX-302 (1993)
  - CBX-S3 (1993, stereo speaker)
  - CBX-T3 (1993, tone generator with MIDI I/F)
- CBX-PCC10 (1996, unknown)

==== Classroom keyboards ====
- SY20 (1982, ensemble synthesizer for classroom)
- SDX27S (1986, classroom version of DX27S)

Hello! Music! for Education

- SDX-2000 (1989, classroom keyboard based on EOS B200)
- SDX-3000 (1995, classroom keyboard based on EOS B900)
- SDX-4000 (classroom keyboard based on MO6S)

=== Portable keyboards ===
TYU series
Music Card ROM cartridge & LED key guide

- TYU-30 Fun-Keyboard (mini KB, squarewave tone)
- TYU-40 (mini KB, squarewave tone, pitchbender & microphone)

==== PortaSound ====
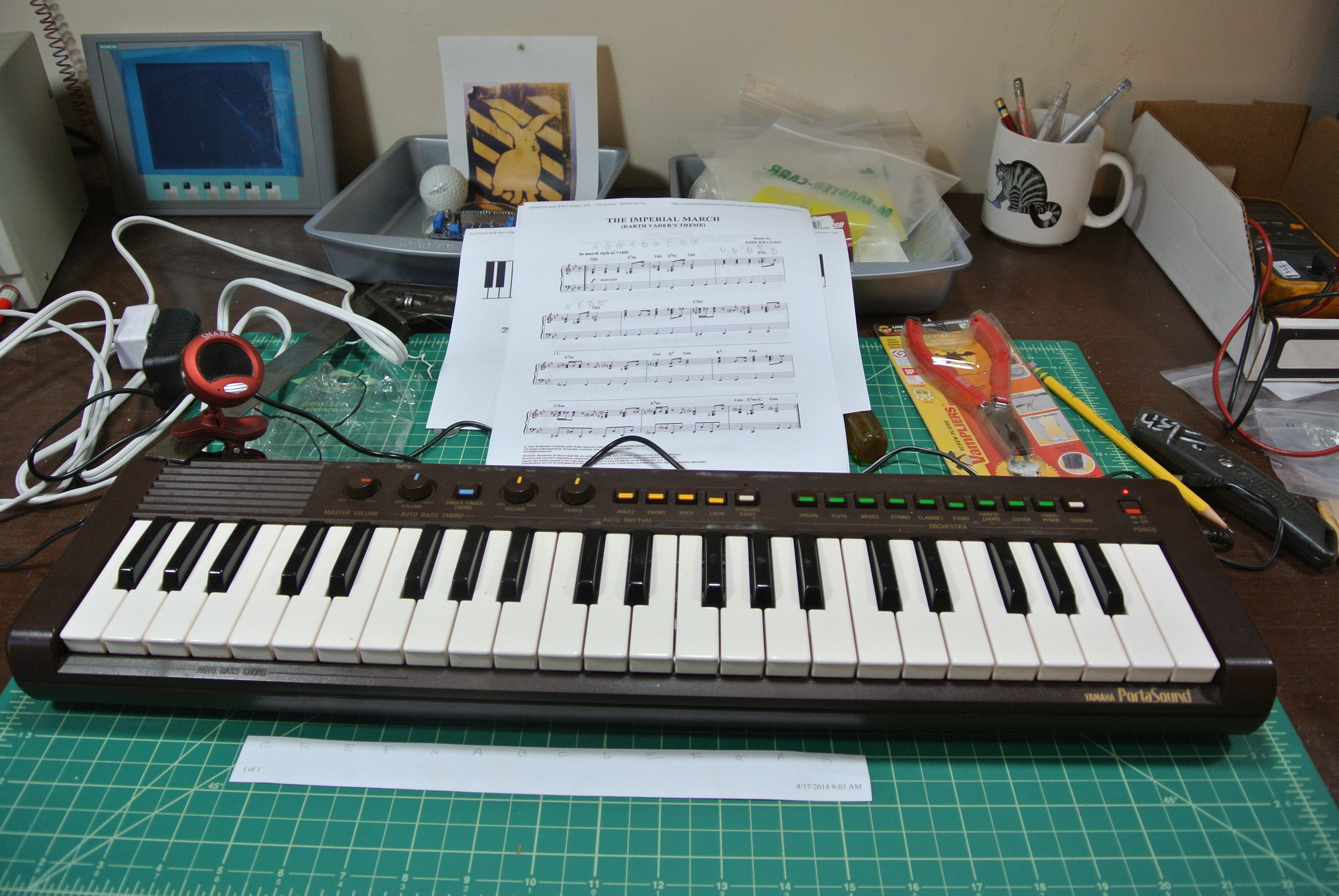
PS-3

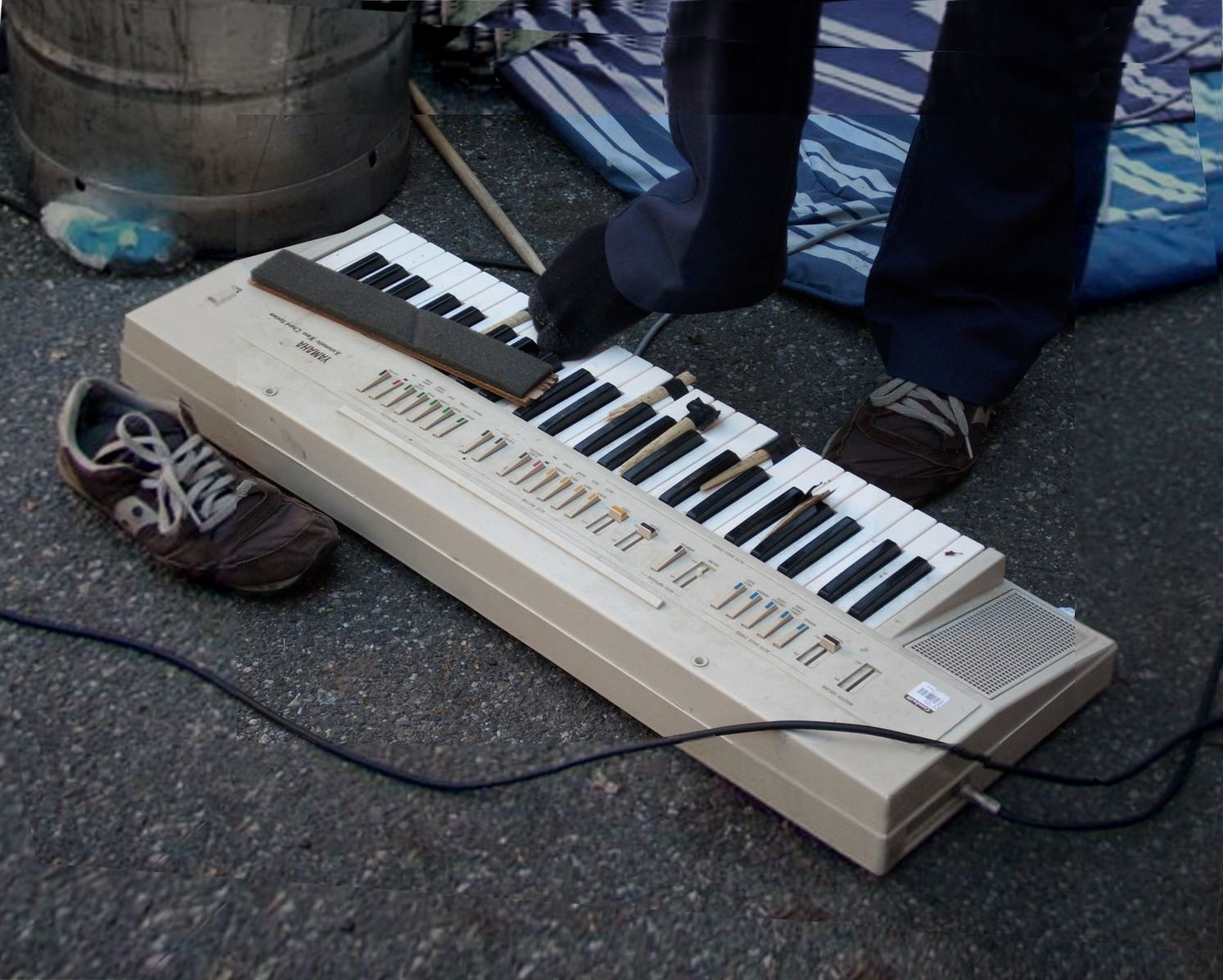
PS-20

- PS-1 / PS-2 / PS-3 (1980, mini KB)
- PS-10 / PS-20 / PS-30 / PS-30B (1981/1982, 44-48key)
- PS-300 / PS-400 (1982, mini KB)
- MP-1 (1982, mini KB, with built-in musical score printer)
- PS-25 / PS-35 / PS-35S (1983, S = Silver)
- PS-55 / PS-55S (1983, stereo, S=Silver (colour), CPU Intel 8085, Waveform Synth IG09510)
- MK-100 (1983, mini KB, digital sound)
- PS-200 (1984, mini KB)
- PS-6100 (1984)

===== PortaSound PlayCard series =====
PlayCard music card reader models

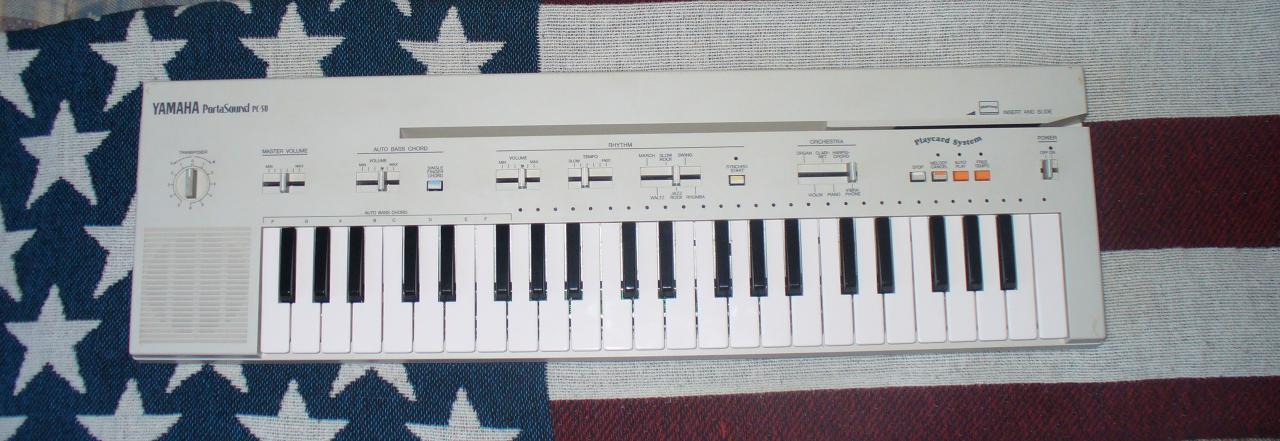
PC-50

- PC-50 (1983, mini KB)
- PC-100 (1982, mini KB)
- PC-1000 (1983)
- PCS-30 / PCS-500 (1984)
- PCR-800 (1985)

===== PortaSound PSS series =====
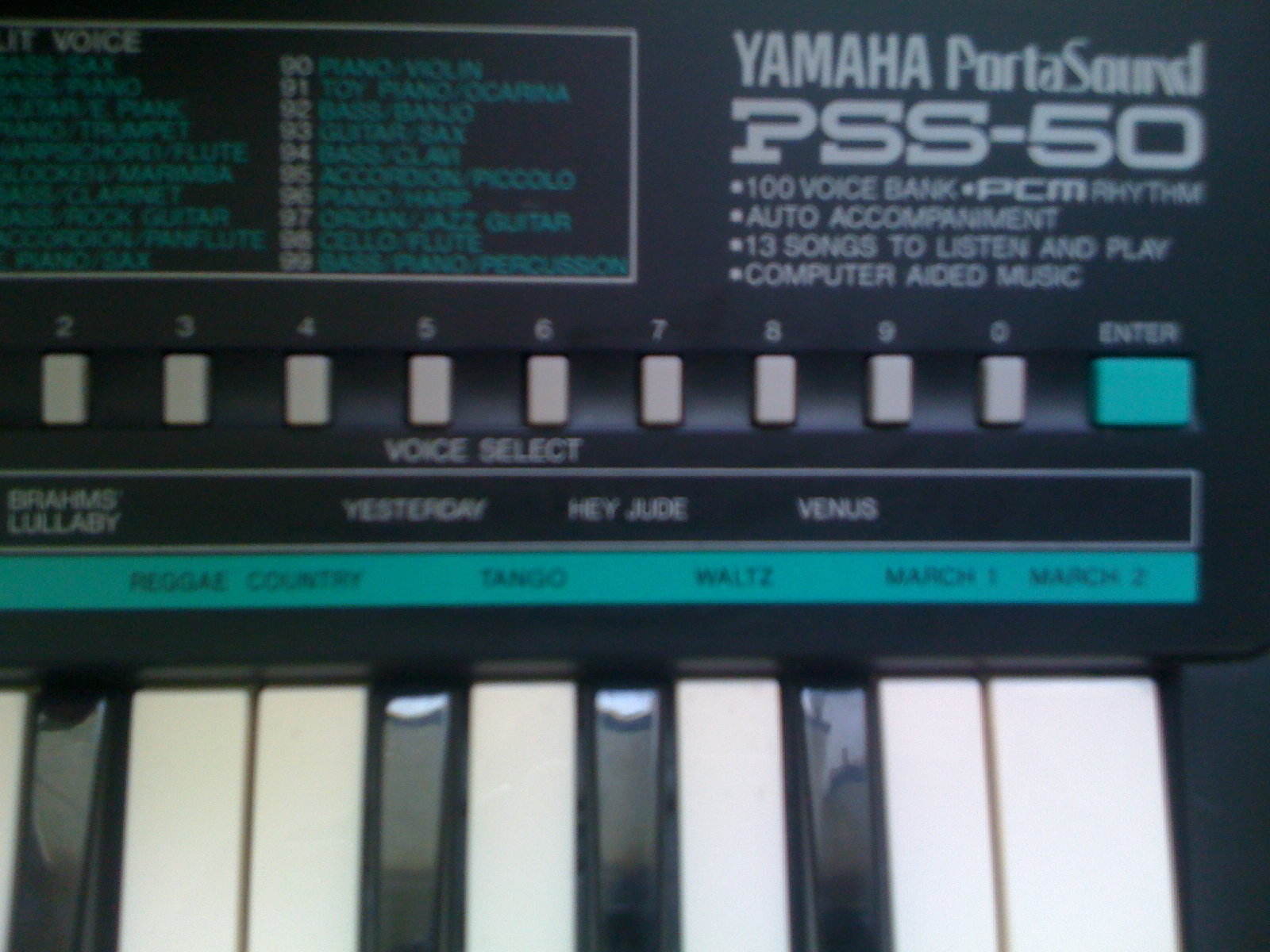
PSS-50

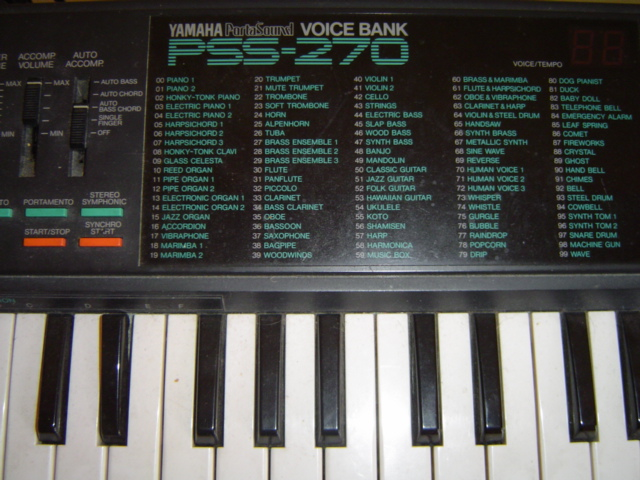
PSS-270

- PSS-6 (1994, sample)
- PSS-7 (1997, ellipse shape body; wavetable (or sample) with granular sounds)
- PSS-8 (1988)
- PSS-9 (1990)
- PSS-11 / PSS-21 / PSS-31 / PSS-51 (1992, sample)
- PSS-12 (1994)
- PSS-14 (1997, wavetable (or sample) with granular sounds)
- PSS-15 (1997)
- PSS-16 (FM, acc.&demo) (1990)
- PSS-20 (1989)
- PSS-26 (1995)
- PSS-30 (1982)
- PSS-50 (1990, FM with realtime sliders)
- PSS-51 (1992)
- PSS-80 / PSS-80R / PSS-100 / PSS-280 / PSS-380 / PSS-580 / PSS-780 (1989, R = red)
- PSS-102 / PSS-104 (1991, with music card, music cartridge (PSS-102) and microphone)
- PSS-110 / PSS-150 / PSS-260 / PSS-450 (1985, squarewave/squarewave/digital/?)
- PSS-125 (8 voice polyphony, 32 Keys, squarewave)
- PSS-120 / PSS-160 (1986)
- PSS-130 (1987)
- PSS-140 37-keys 100-sounds, YM2413 / PSS-480 / PSS-680 (1988, FM&acc)
- PSS-170 44-keys 100-sounds, YM2413 (1986)
- PSS-190 / PSS-290 / / PSS-590 / PSS-790 (1990, FM with realtime sliders)
- PSS-270 49-keys 100-sounds, YM2413 (1986, two FM operators, nine voice polyphony), XC194AO
- PSS-280 (1986, reduced feature version of PSS-270)
- PSS-360 (1986, squarewave)
- PSS-370 (1987)
- PSS-390 (1990)
- PSS-401 (c. 1985, 44-key edition of PS-300, with additional octave control, reduced rhythm section)
- PSS-460 49-keys 21-sounds, YM3812, (1986)
- PSS-470 49-keys 21-sounds, YM3812, (1987)
- PSS-560 49-keys 21-sounds, YM3812, additional drum chip (1986)
- PSS-570 49-keys 21-sounds, YM3812, additional drum chip (1987)
- PSS-680 (FM, MIDI & drum pads) (1988)
- PSS-780 (FM, MIDI & drum pads) (1989)
- PSS-790 (1990)
- PSS-795 (1990)
- PSS-A50/PSS-F30/PSS-E30 (2020)

==== HandySound ====
- HS-200 / HS-400 / HS-500 / HS-501 (1982, extra mini KB)

==== PortaTone ====
===== PortaTone DSR series =====
- DSR-500 (1988)
- DSR-1000 (c. 1987)
- DSR-2000 (c. 1987)

===== PortaTone PSR series =====
PSR

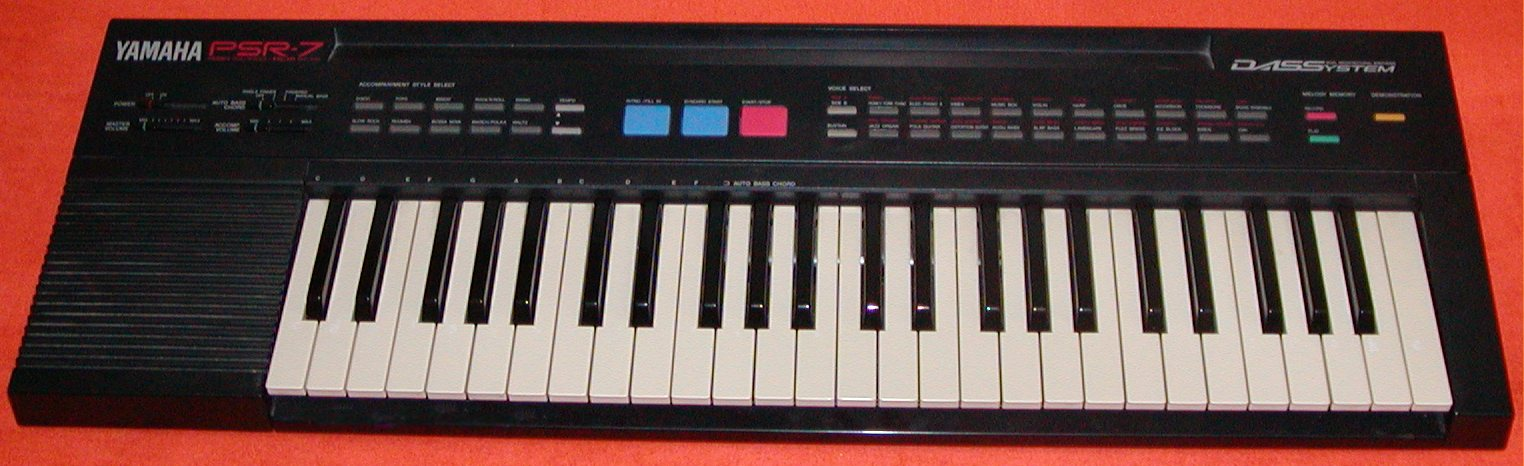
PSR-7

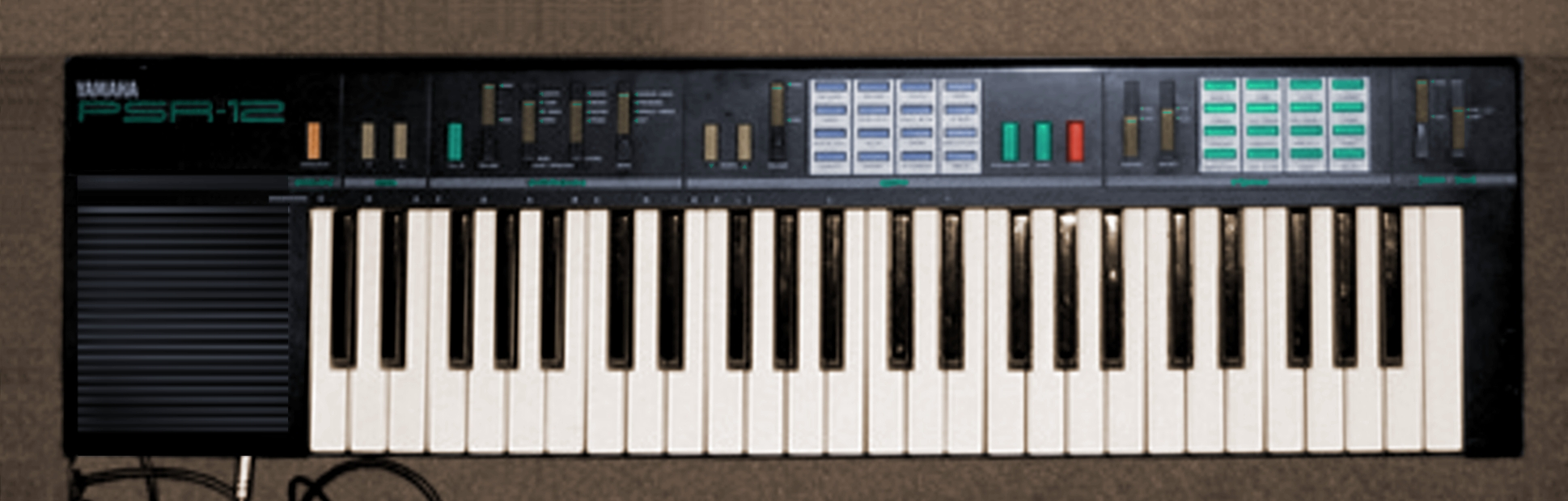
PSR-12

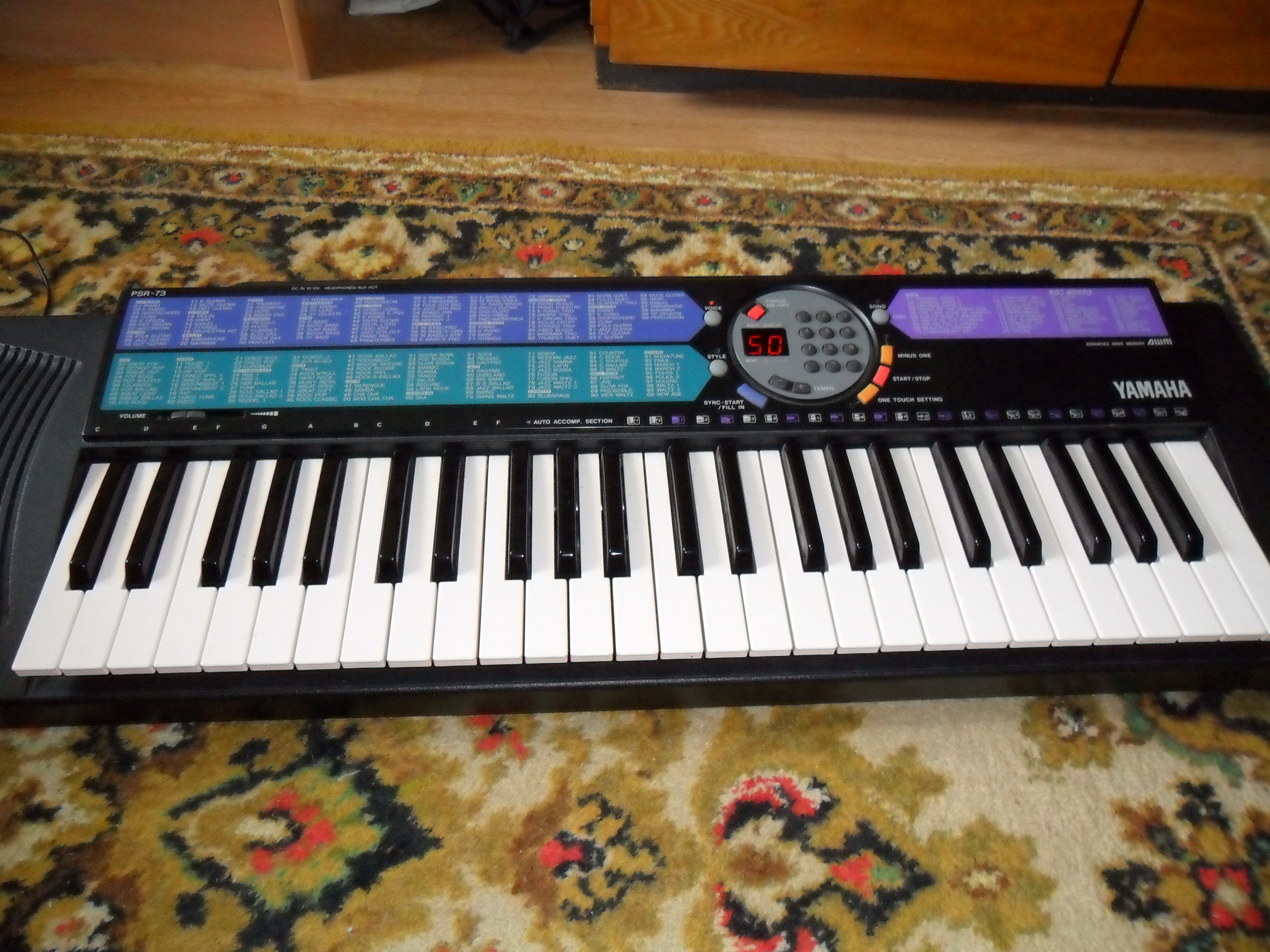
PSR-73

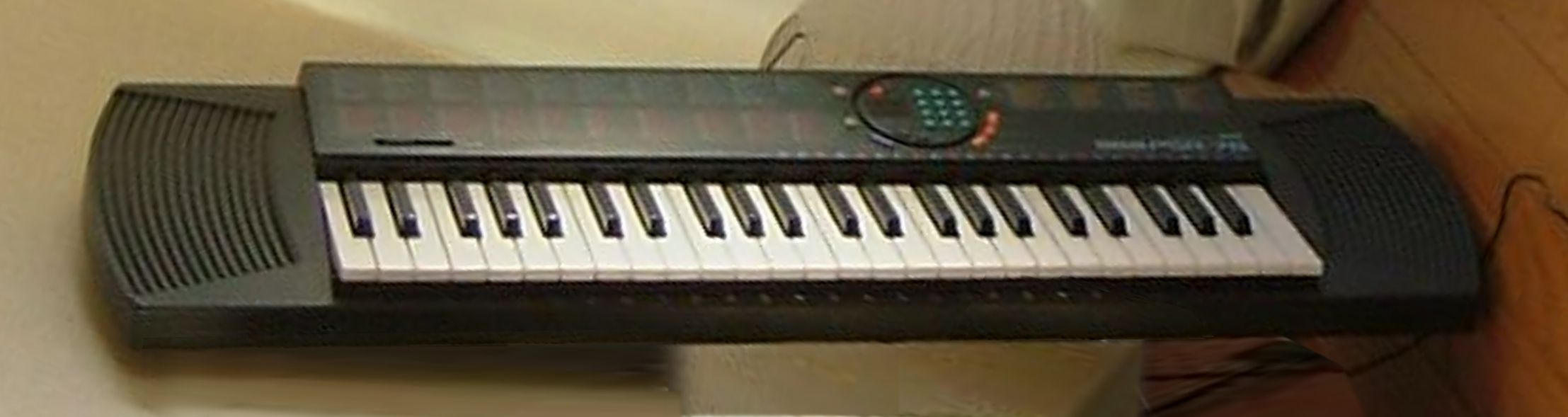
PSR-76

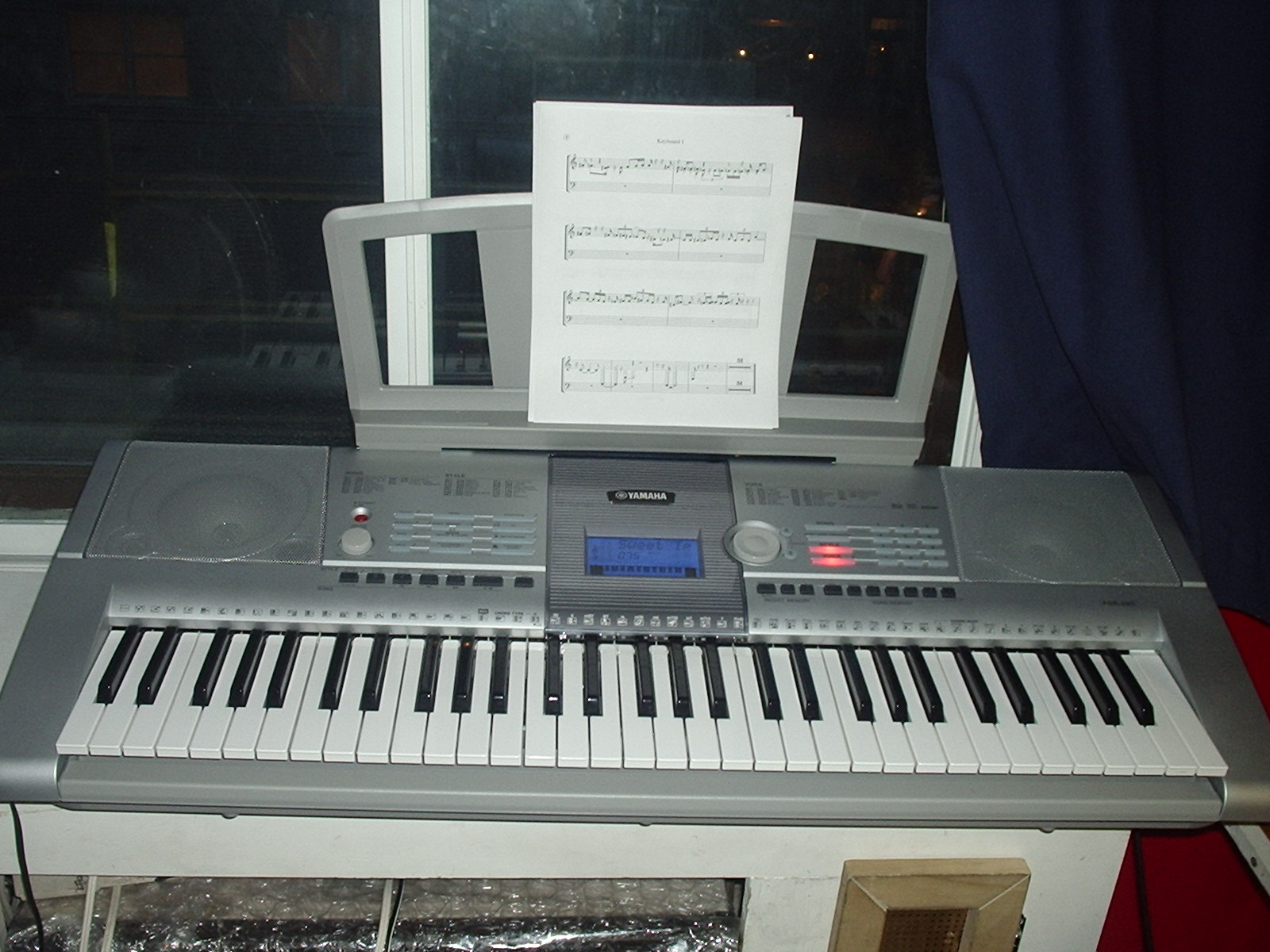
PSR-295

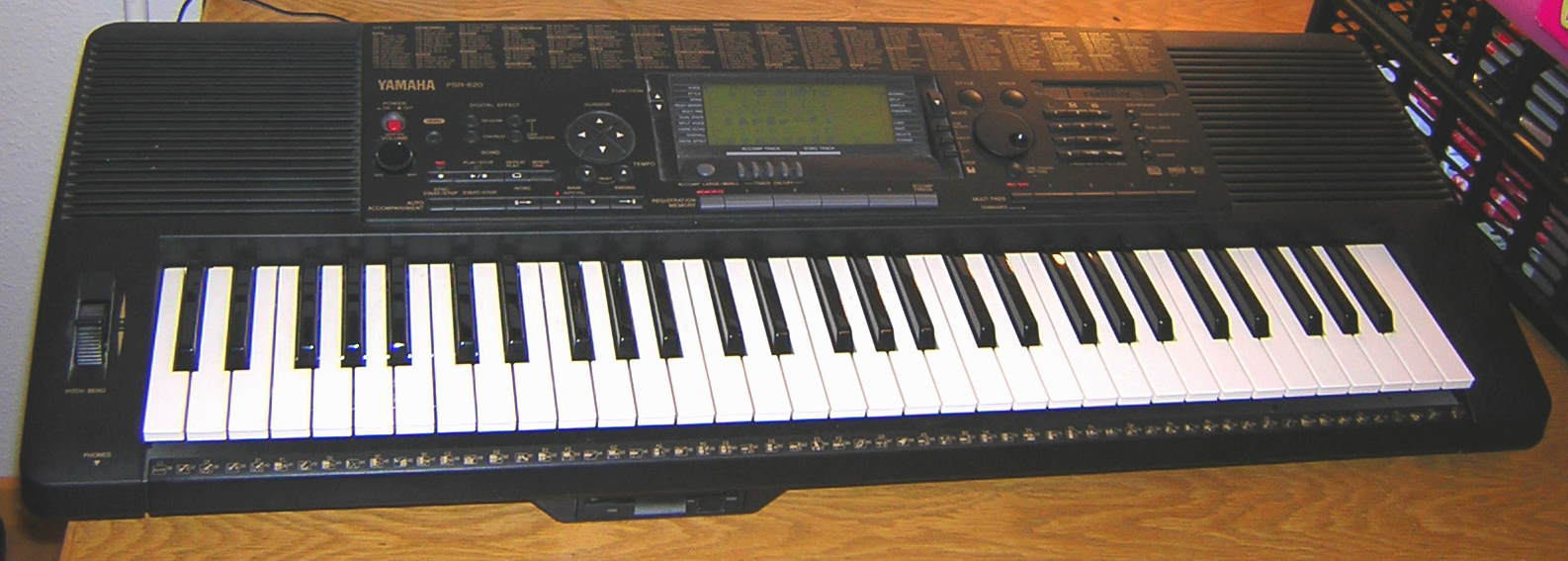
PSR-620

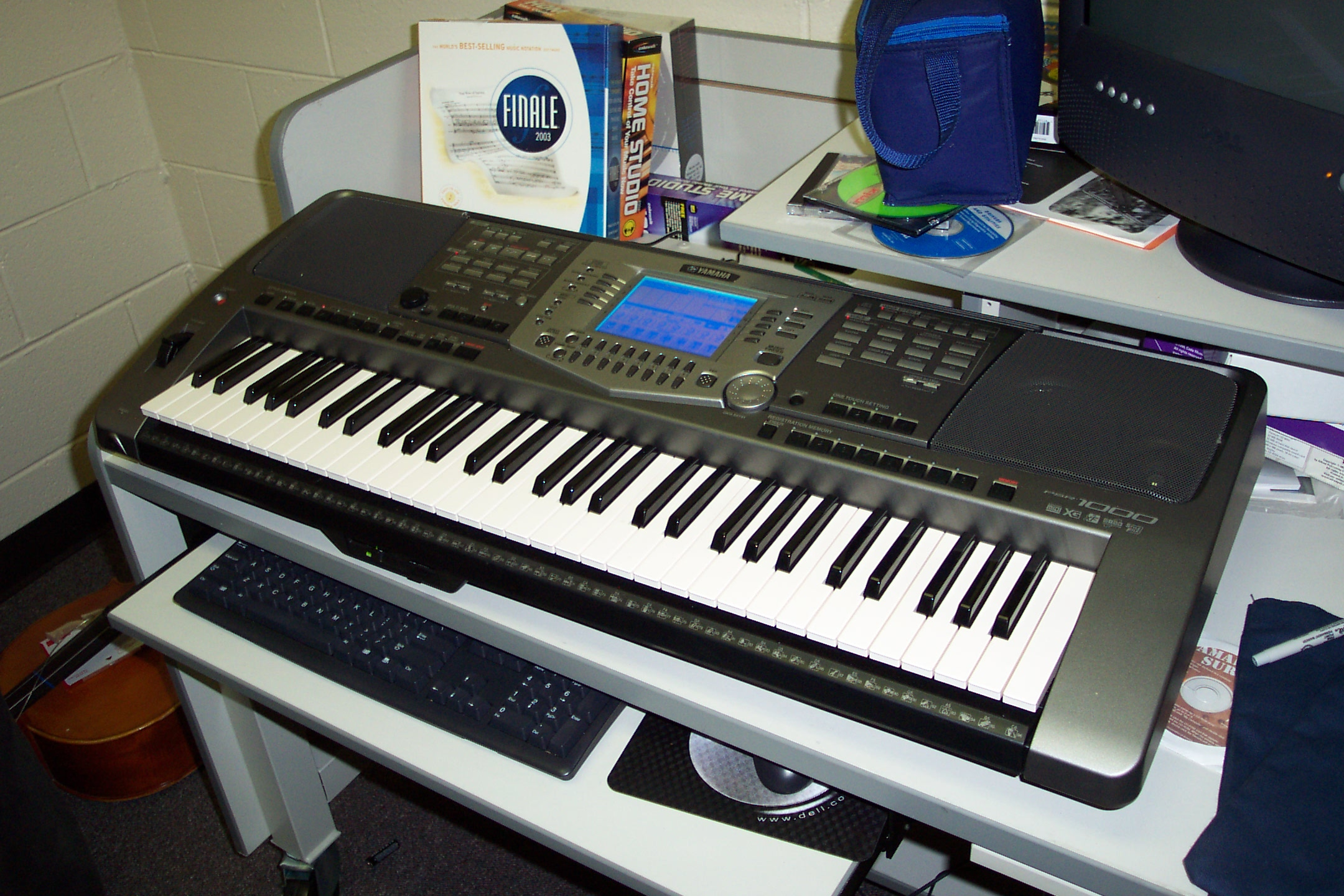
PSR-1000

- PSR-2 (1990)
- PSR-3 (1991)
- PSR-6 49-keys 100-sounds YM2413 chip (1989)
- PSR-7 49-keys 40-sounds (1989)
- PSR-11 49-keys 16-sounds, YM3812 chip, (1986)
- PSR-12 49-keys 32-sounds, YM3812 chip, (1987)
- PSR-15 (1984)
- PSR-16 (1988)
- PSR-18 / PSR-28 / PSR-38 / PSR-48 (1990)
- PSR-19 (1990)
- PSR-21 (1986)
- PSR-22 / PSR-32 (1987)
- PSR-27 / PSR-37 / PSR-47 (1989)
- PSR-31 61-keys 16-sounds, YM3812, additional chip for drums (1991)
- PSR-32 61-keys 32-sounds, YM3812, additional chip for drums (1987)
- PSR-36 (1988)
- PSR-40 / PSR-50 (1985)
- PSR-62, (1985) / oriental model.
- PSR-60, contains YM2154 rhythm chip, (1985)
- PSR-70, contains YM2154 rhythm chip, (1985)
- PSR-73 (1991)
- PSR-74 (1999)
- PSR-75 (1992)
- PSR-76 (1994)
- PSR-77 (1995)
- PSR-78 (1996)
- PSR-79 (1998)
- PSR-80, contains YM2414 (fm) and YM2154 (rhythm) chips (1987)
- PSR-90 (1987)
- PSR-85 (1994)
- PSR-100 (1991)
- PSR-110 (1993)
- PSR-125 (2002)
- PSR-130 (1997)
- PSR-140 / PSR-140PC (1999)
- PSR-150 (1992)
- PSR-160 (2000, export model)
- PSR-170 (2001 or 2002)
- PSR-172 (2003)
- PSR-175 (2004, export model)
- PSR-180 (1994)
- PSR-185 (1995)
- PSR-190 (1996)
- PSR-195 / PSR-195PC (1998)
- PSR-200 (1991)
- PSR-201 (2000)
- PSR-202 (2002, export model)
- PSR-210 (1993)
- PSR-215 (1995)
- PSR-220/PSR-220PC (1996)
- PSR-225/PSR-225GM/PSR-225PC (1998/2001/1998)
- PSR-230 (1996)
- PSR-240 (1999)
- PSR-260 (26 January 2000)
- PSR-262 (26 January 2000)
- PSR-270 (7 December 1998)
- PSR-273 (29 January 2003, export model)
- PSR-275 (29 January 2003)
- PSR-280 (8 March 2001)
- PSR-282 (26 January 2000, export model)
- PSR-290 (25 January 2002)
- PSR-292 (25 January 2002, export model)
- PSR-293 (27 January 2004, export model)
- PSR-295 (27 January 2004, export model)
- PSR-300 (7 March 1991)
- PSR-310 / PSR-310M (11 January 1993)
- PSR-320 (23 March 1995)
- PSR-330 (31 January 1997)
- PSR-340 (1 March 1999)
- PSR-350 (26 January 2001)
- PSR-400 (19 May 1991)
- PSR-403 (24 September 1992)
- PSR-410 (15 June 1993)
- PSR-420 (23 March 1995)
- PSR-450 (2004)
- PSR-500 / PSR-500M (19 May 1991)
- PSR-510 / PSR-510M (15 June 1993)
- PSR-520 (18 May 1995)
- PSR-530 / PSR-530PC (14 April 1997)
- PSR-540 / PSR-540PC (3 March 1999)
- PSR-550 (30 November 2000)
- PSR-600 (1992)
- PSR-620 (1995)
- PSR-630 (14 April 1997)
- PSR-640 (3 March 1999)
- PSR-730 (14 April 1997)
- PSR-740 (3 March 1999)
- PSR-1000 (25 June 2001)
- PSR-1100 (10 September 2002)
- PSR-1700 (1993, export model)
- PSR-2000 (25 June 2001)
- PSR-2100 (10 September 2002)
- PSR-2500 / PSR-3500 / PSR-4500 (1989)
- PSR-2700 (1993, export model)
- PSR-4000 (1995)
- PSR-4600 (1990, export model)
- PSR-5700 (1992)
- PSR-6000 (1994, export model)
- PSR-6300 (1986), contains two YM2414 (FM) and YM2154 (rhythm) chips
- PSR-6700 (1991, export model)

PSR-E

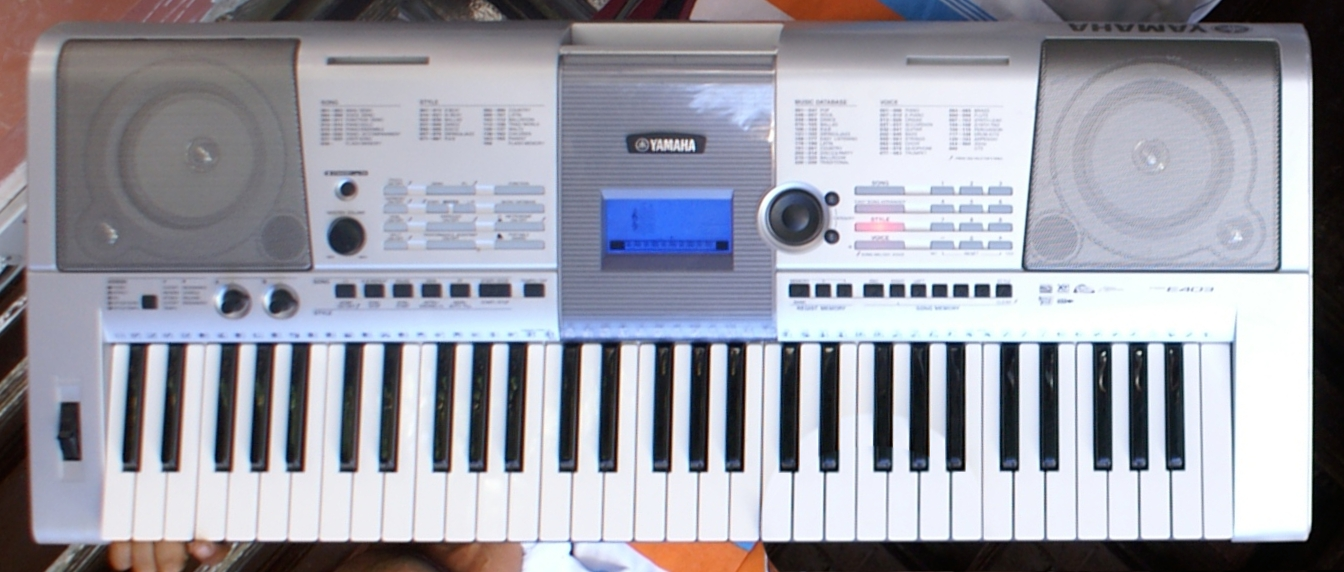
PSR-E403

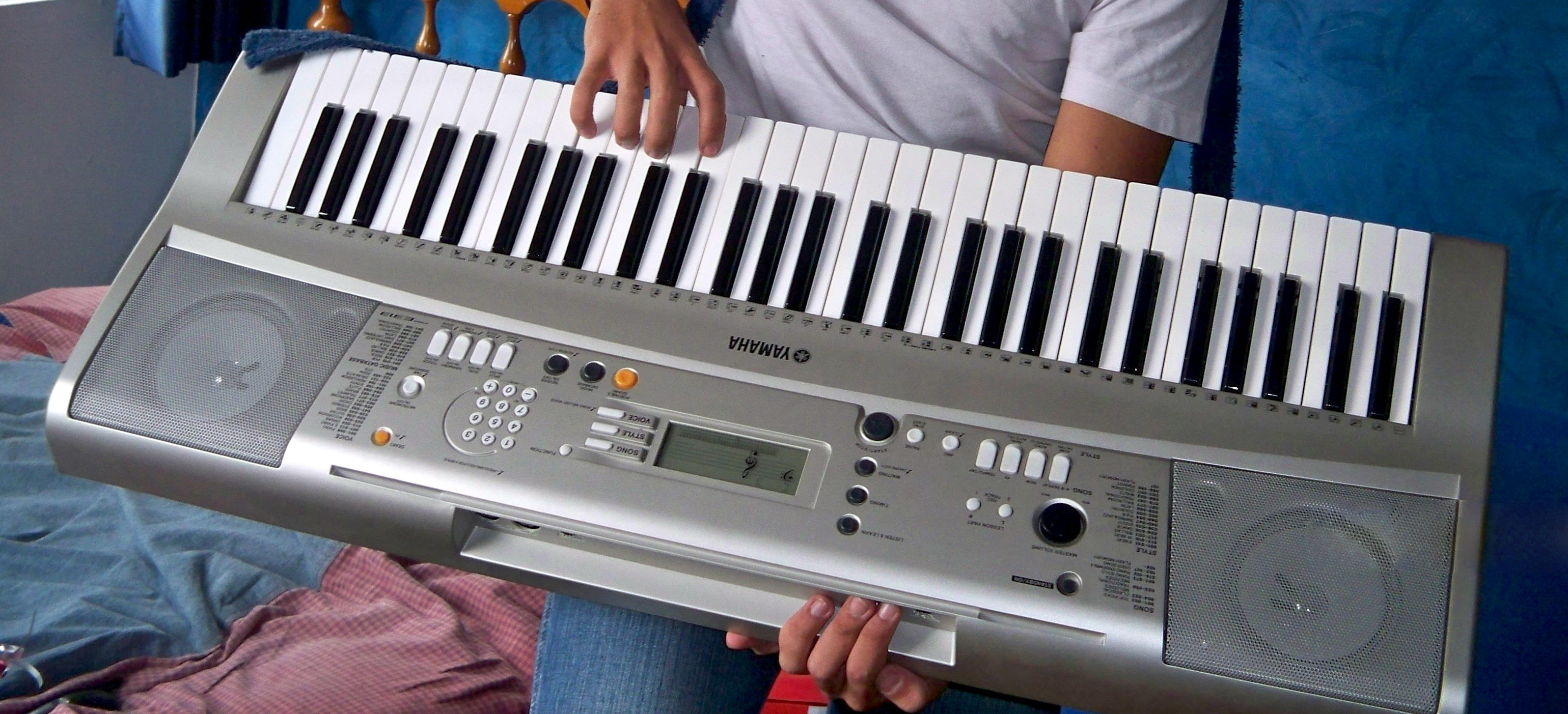
PSR-E313

- PSR-E203 (2005)
- PSR-E213 (2007)
- PSR-E223 (2009)
- PSR-E233 (2011)
- PSR-E243 (2013)
- PSR-E253 (2015)
- PSR-E263 (2017)
- PSR-E273 (2020)
- PSR-E283 (2024)
- PSR-E303 (2005)
- PSR-E313 (2007)
- PSR-E323 (2009)
- PSR-E333 (2011)
- PSR-E343 (2013)
- PSR-E353 (2015)
- PSR-E363 (2017)
- PSR-E373 / PSR-EW310 (2020)
- PSR-E383 / PSR-EW320 (2024)
- PSR-E403 (2005)
- PSR-E413 (2007)
- PSR-E423 (2009, with touch response)
- PSR-E433 (2011)
- PSR-E443 (2013)
- PSR-E453 / PSR-EW400 (2015, Stadium Rock is first style, SurfRock, BeachRock, CanadianRock, ChartPianoPop, 70sRock added in 8Beat, New Style Collection is Movie & Show and 38 styles including WildWest, Showtune and TapDanceSwing, etc. in Movie & Show and Another Style collection is Entertainer and 34 styles in Entertainer)
- PSR-E463 / PSR-EW410 (2017, 758 high-quality voices with 1 sample voice for sampling, 235 styles, 30 built-in songs, 10 user songs, 8 banks with 4 registrations, and groove generator) The EW410 offers 76 keys and features phono jacks for connecting external powered speakers. The E463 has 61 keys.
- PSR-E473 / PSR-EW425 (2021, 820 high-quality voices with Super Articulation Lite and 1 sample voice for sampling, 290 styles,30 built-in songs, 10 user songs, 8 banks with 4 registrations, and groove generator) The EW425 offers 76 keys and features phono jacks for connecting external powered speakers. The E473 has 61 keys.
- PSR-E483 / PSR-E583 (2026, PSR-E483: 860 voices; PSR-E583: 890 voices with Super Articulation Lite and 1 sample voice for sampling, 345 styles, 2 built-in songs, 10 user songs, 8 banks with 4 registrations, auto chord play, Looper, and MegaBoost (2 steps: approx. +3 dB and +6 dB)) The E583 also has an added modulation wheel and a volume pedal connector. Both the E483 and E583 have 61 keys and feature a USB Type-C connector to host instead of the standard Type-B connector.

PSR others

- PSR-I510 / PSR-I610 (21 January 2026, respectively based on PSR-E483 and E583 with added Indian voices and styles)
- PSR-I400 (2019, with Indian styles)
- PSR-I500 (10 April 2018, with Indian styles)
- PSR-I455 (28 December 2011, with Indian styles)
- PSR-I425 (18 May 2007, with touch response)
- PSR-A3 (1995, with Arabic Scale)
- PSR-D1 / PSRD1-DJX (1998, DJ keyboard)
- PSR-SQ16 (1992)
- PSR-GX76 (2000, export model, with Portable Grand)
- PSR-K1 (6 February 2003, with Karaoke function and built-in microphone)
- PSR-F50/PSR-F51/PSR-F52

EOS series (including YS/SDX/TQ)

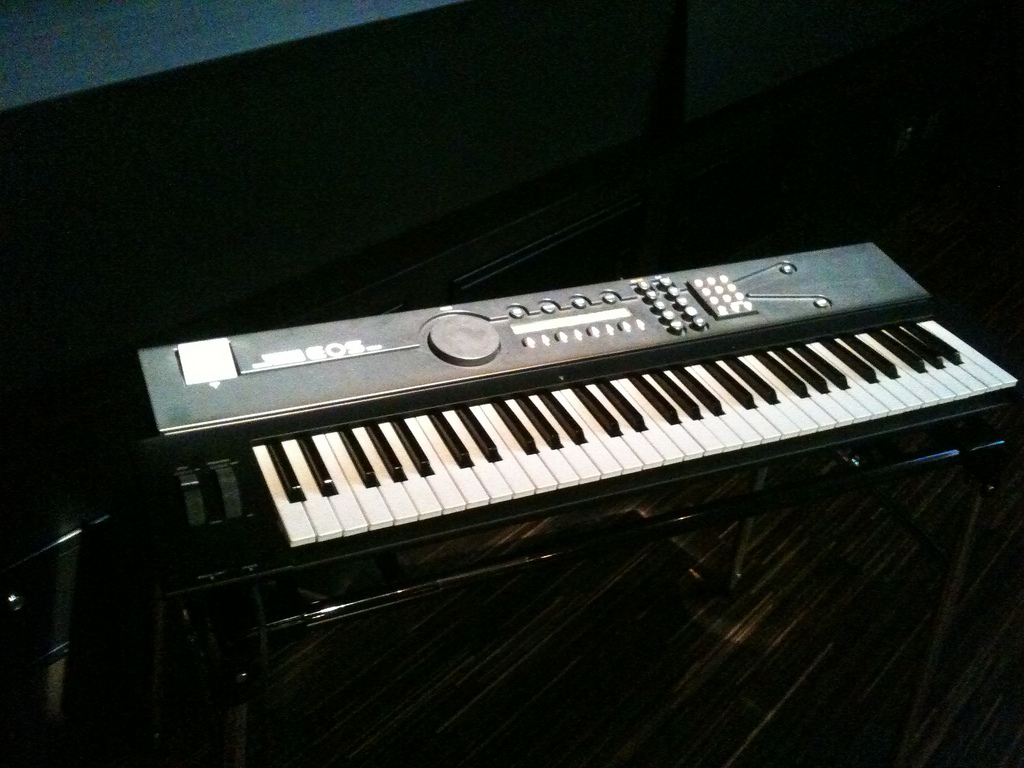
EOS YS200

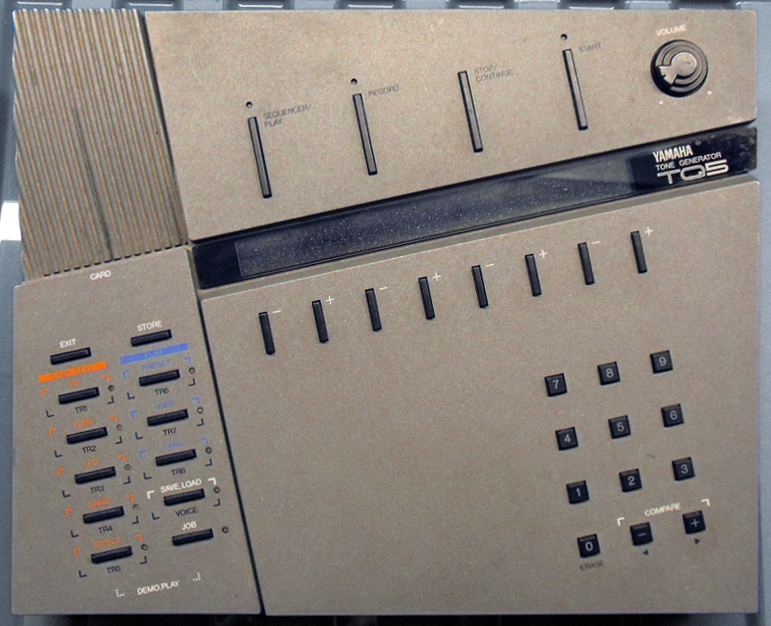
- TQ5 designed by Hartmut Esslinger (1988)
  EOS YS100 / YS100 (1988, easy operating FM synth, 4op FM/8 muti-timbral)
- EOS YS200 / YS200 / TQ5 (1988, YS100 with 8track sequencer, TQ = desktop module version)
- EOS DS55 (c. 1988)
- EOS B200 / SDX-2000 (1988/1989, SDX = classroom keyboard)
- EOS B500 (1990)
- EOS B700 (1993, minor change of B500)
- EOS B900 / SDX-3000 (1995/1995, floppy disk, SDX = classroom keyboard)
- EOS B900EX (1996, minor change of B900, with blue body and USB)
- EOS B2000 / EOS B2000W (1998, with sequencer similar to QY700, sampling similar to SU10, W = white)
- EOS BX (2001, produced by Daisuke Asakura, based on S03 with USB)

==== EZ series ====
PSR-J/EZ series keyboard

- EZ-J14 (2003)
- EZ-J15 (2005)
- EZ20 (2001, export model)
- PSR-J20 / PSR-J20C (1999)
- PSR-J21 (2000)
- EZ-J22 (2001)
- EZ-J23 (2002, silver & pink)
- EZ-J24 (2003)
- EZ-J25 (2005)
- EZ-30 (26 January 2001, export model)
- EZ-300 (2020)
- EZ-310 (2024)
- PSR-J51 (2000)
- EZ-J53 (2002)
- EZ-150 (2003, export model)
- EZ-200 / EZ-J200 (18 January 2007)
- EZ-220 (20 February 2012)
- EZ-J210 (2009)
- EZ-250i (17 March 2003, export model, bundled Konami Keyboard Mania)

=== Silent instruments ===
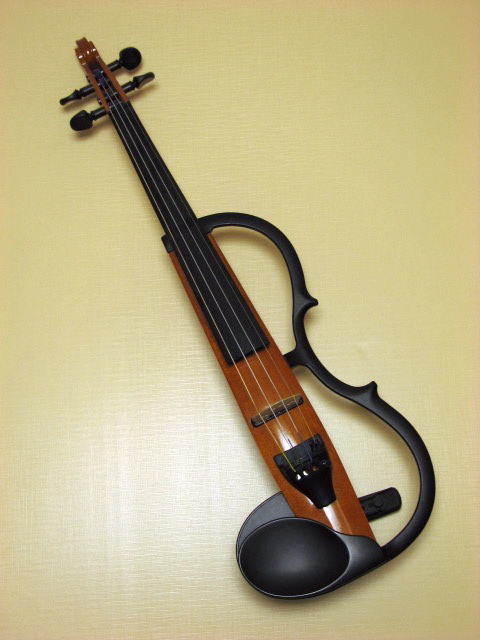
SV-100

==== Electric violins ====
- YSV-104
- SV-120 (discontinued)
- SV-130 (discontinued)
- SV-150 (discontinued)
- SV-200 (discontinued)
- EV-204 (discontinued)
- EV-205 (discontinued)
- SV-250
- SV-255

==== Electric violas ====
- SVV-200SK

==== Electric cellos ====
- SVC-50SK
- SVC-100 (discontinued)
- SVC-110SK
- SVC-200SK
- SVC-210SK

==== Electric upright basses ====
- SLB-100SK
- SLB-200SK
- SLB-200LTD
- SLB300

=== Guitars ===
==== Acoustic guitars ====
F310

===== Classical guitars =====
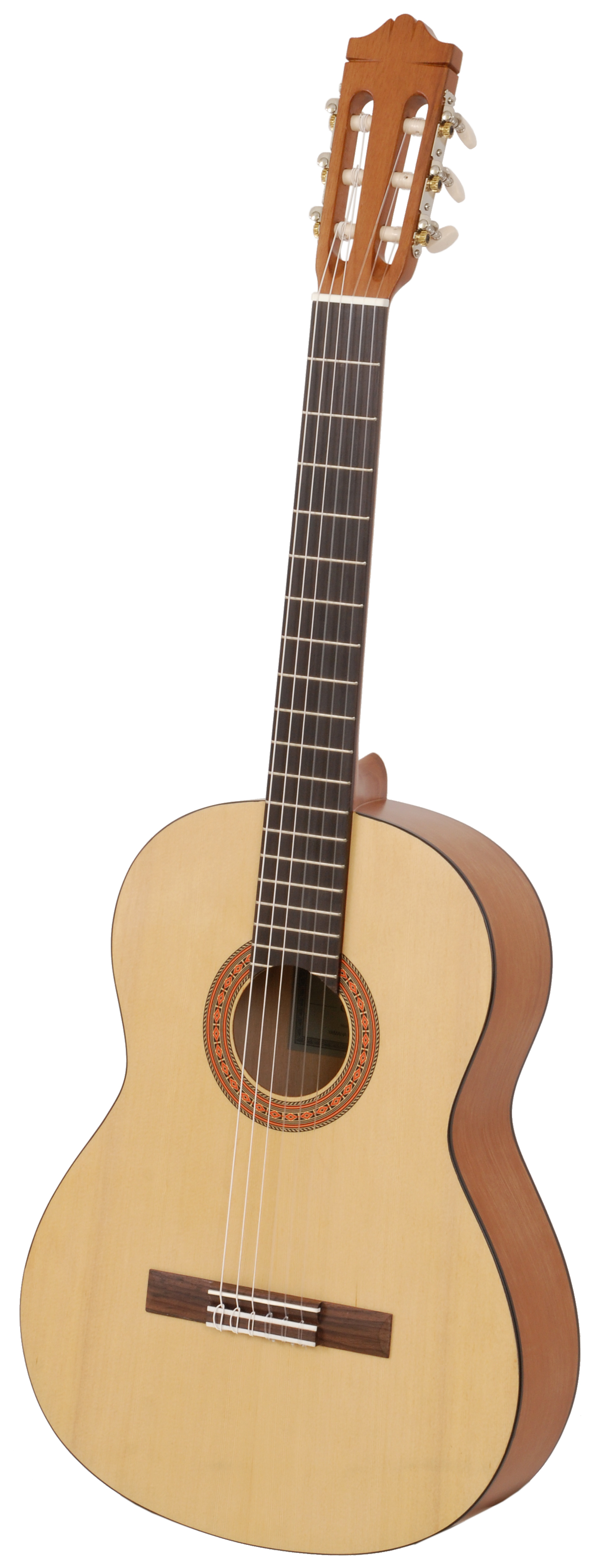
C-30M

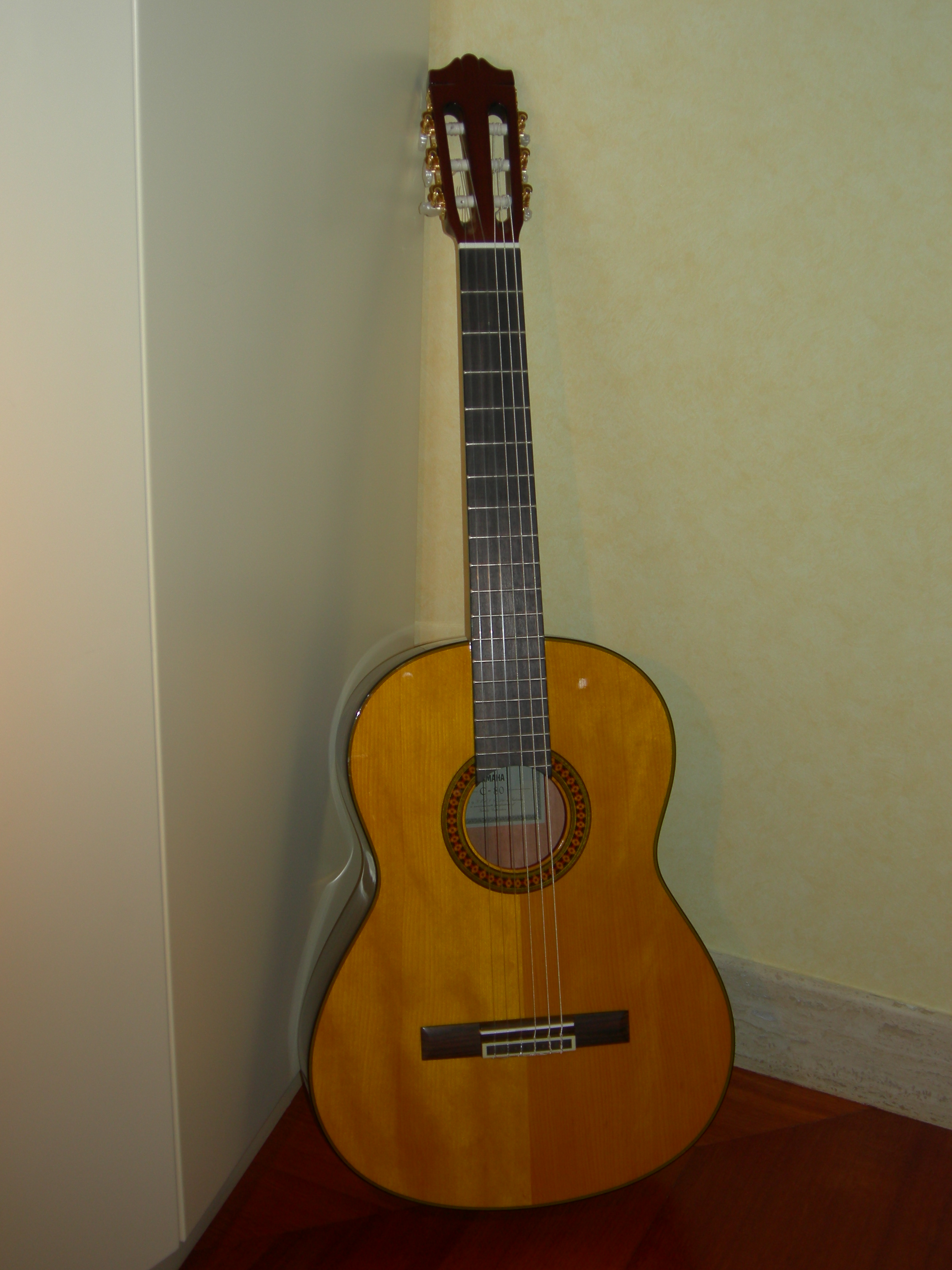
C-80

Concert Classic

- GC-3 (c. 1967)
- GC-5 (c. 1967) Solid cedar top, laminate rosewood back and sides
- GC-7 (c. 1967) Solid cedar top, laminate rosewood back and sides
- GC-10 (c. 1967) Solid cedar top, Solid rosewood back and sides
- gc 60 (c. 1968)
- Concert Classic 80 (c. 1968)
- Concert Classic 100 (c. 1968)
- Concert Classic 120 (c. 1968)
- Concert Classic 150 (c. 1968)

Flamenco series

- GC-5F (c. 1968)
- GC-7F (c. 1968)
- GC-10F (c. 1968)

Custom Classical guitars

- GC-30A (c. 1974)
- GC-30B (c. 1974)
- GC-30C (c. 1974)

C series
(S = small body model)

- C-30S (c. 1984, small body)
- C40
- C-50S (c. 1984, small body)
- C-170A (c. 1984)
- C-200A (c. 1984)
- C-250A (c. 1984)
- C-300A (c. 1984)
- C-400A (c. 1984)
- C-530 (c. 1988)

Grand Concert Classic

- CG-150 (c. 1968)
- CG-180SA (c. 1966)

CG series

- CG-100A
- CG-101A
- CG-120
- CG-120A
- CG-151
- CG-171SF

GD series

- GD-10[C] (1990)
- GD-20[C] (1990)
- GD-20[E][CE] (1992)

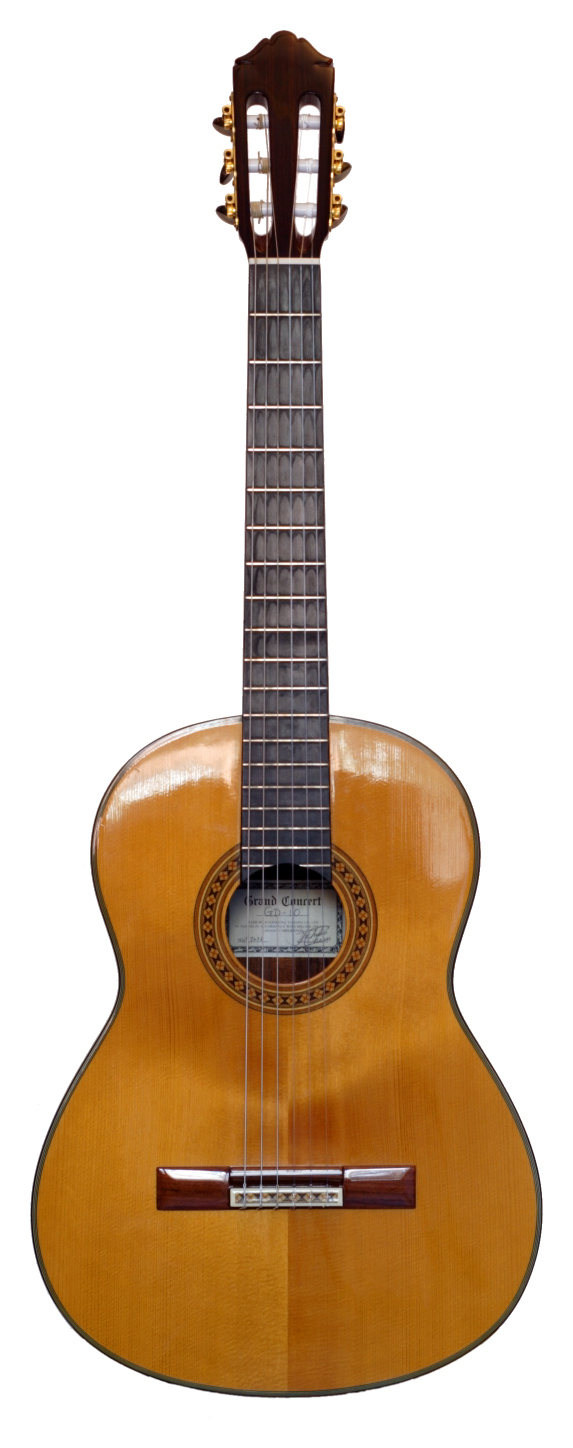
Grand Concert GD-10

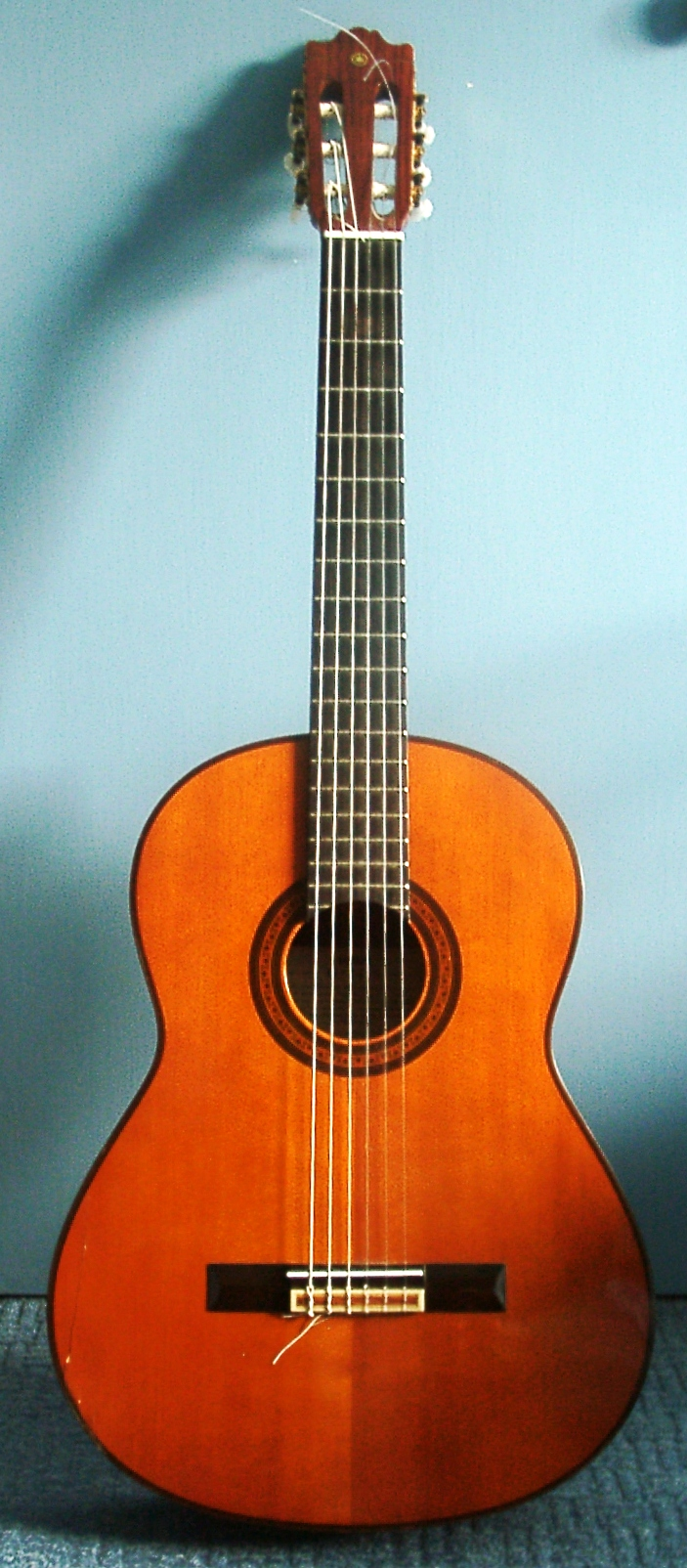
G-245S

G series
Model Years MSR Description

- G50A 1969-72 $69.50
- G-60 1966- $59.00 Two-piece spruce top, maple back and sides, rosewood fingerboard and bridge, length 39 1/4 inches, width 14 1/2 inches
- G60A 1969-73 $79.50
- G65A 1972-74 $95.50
- G70A 1969-$72 --.--
- G-80 1966- (1970 price $69.00) Two-piece spruce top, maple back and sides, rosewood fingerboard and bridge, nineteen nickel silver frets, length 39 1/4 inches, width 14 1/2inches
- G80A 1969-74 $75.00
- G85A 1970-72 $89.50
- G90A 1967-74 $125.50
- G-100 1967-76 (1970 price $79.00) Two-piece spruce top, maple back and sides, rosewood fingerboard and bridge with nineteen nickel silver frets, length 39 1/4 inches, width 14 1/2 inches
- G100A 1970-72 $99.50
- G-120 1966- (1970 price $89.00) Two-piece spruce top, curly maple back and sides, mahogany neck, rosewood fingerboard and bridge, length 39 1/4 inches, width 14 1/2 inches
- G120A 1970-76 $142.50
- G130A 1969-76 $119.50
- G-150 1966-
- G150A 1970-76 $166.50
- G-160 1970-1977-? (1970 price $109.00) Two-piece spruce top, rosewood back and sides, mahogany neck, nineteen nickel silver frets, six color wood marquetry around soundhole, length 39 1/4 inches, width 14 1/2 inches, 36-inch scale
- G280A 1972-74 $300
- G231S 1978-80 Spruce top, laminate mahogany back and sides, rosewood fretboard and bridge, nut width 2 inches - 51 mm
- G-245S 1977-81 $265.00 Solid spruce top, laminate rosewood back and sides, rosewood fretboard and bridge, Nato neck 658 mm scale
- G-245Sii 1981-$1985 --.--
- G-250S 1977-1981 $290 Solid spruce top/quarter sawn, real wood marquetry rosette, triple laminated veneer head, Ebony fingerboard, rosewood back and sides, rosewood bridge, transverse fan type bracing, concert scale size of 260mm with a 52mm nut width
- G255S 1977-81 $360.00 Solid spruce top/quarter sawn, real wood marquetry rosette, triple laminated veneer head, Ebony fingerboard, rosewood back and sides, Jacaranda bridge, transverse fan type bracing, concert scale size of 260mm with a 52mm nut width
- G255Sii 1981-85 $375.00 Solid cedar top
- G-260S 1981-$85 xxx.xx Concert guitar laminated back/sides

===== Steel and nylon string option guitars =====
Dynamic Guitar

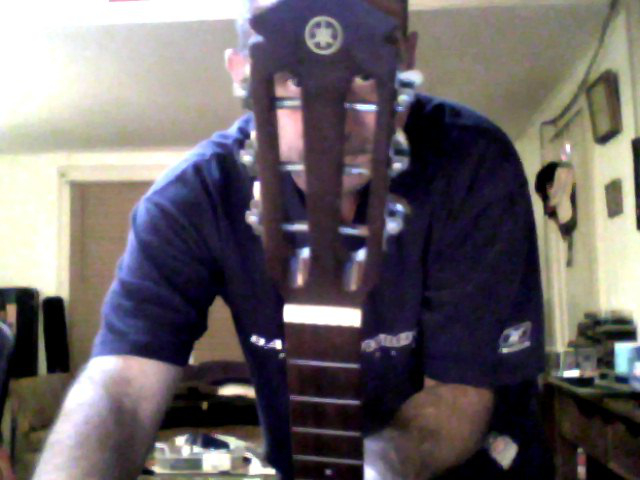
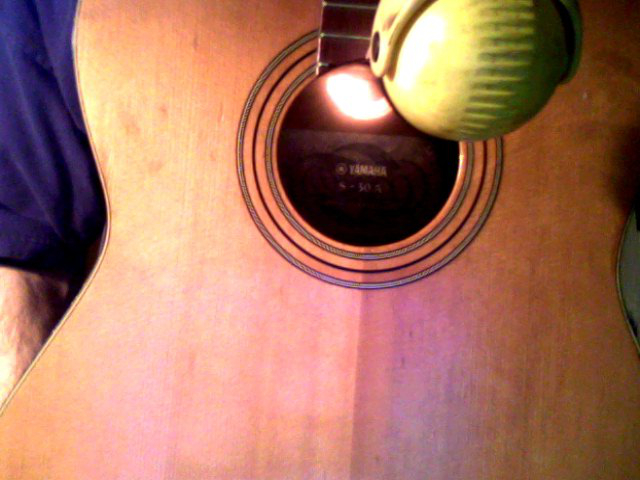
Yamaha Dynamic Guitar S-50A (c. 1969): headstock and soundhole.
- No. 30 (1950s)
- No. 50 (1950s)
- No. 70 (c. 1958)
- No. 1 / No. 1A / No. 1B (c. 1958)
- No. 2 (c. 1958 or 1961)
- No. 4 (1950s/1960s)
- No. 8 (c. 1958)
- No. 10A / No. 10B (before 1963)
- No. 15 (before 1963)
- No. 20 / No. 20A (before 1963/after 1963)
- No. 40 (c. 1958)
- No. 80 (before 1963)
- S-20
- S50 / S-50 (after 1963)
- S70 / S-70 (after 1963)
- No. 25 (c. 1964)
- No. 45 (c. 1964)
- No. 60 (c. 1964)
- No. 85 (c. 1964)
- No.100 (c. 1967)
- No. 120 (c. 1964)
- No. 300 (c. 1964)

===== Steel-string acoustic guitars =====
F series

F-310

- F-315
- F-325
- F-335 TBS
- F-370
- F-D01
- FD01S
- F-D02

FS Series

Early & Legacy FS Models

- FS-5 (original, 1960s Japan-made)
- FS-700S
- FS-720

FS800 Series (launched 2016)

- FS-800
- FS-v820
- FS-830
- FS-850

Acoustic-Electric (cutaway) versions

- FS-X800C
- FS-X820C
- FS-X830C

Special version

- FS-TA (TransAcoustic)

Red Label Series (launched 2019)

- FS-3
- FS-5

FG series
label colors: R,R2:red label, G,G2:green label, B:black label
body shapes: folk / '68jumbo / jumbo / new jumbo / HQ jumbo / yamaha jumbo / semi-jumbo / western / yamaha western

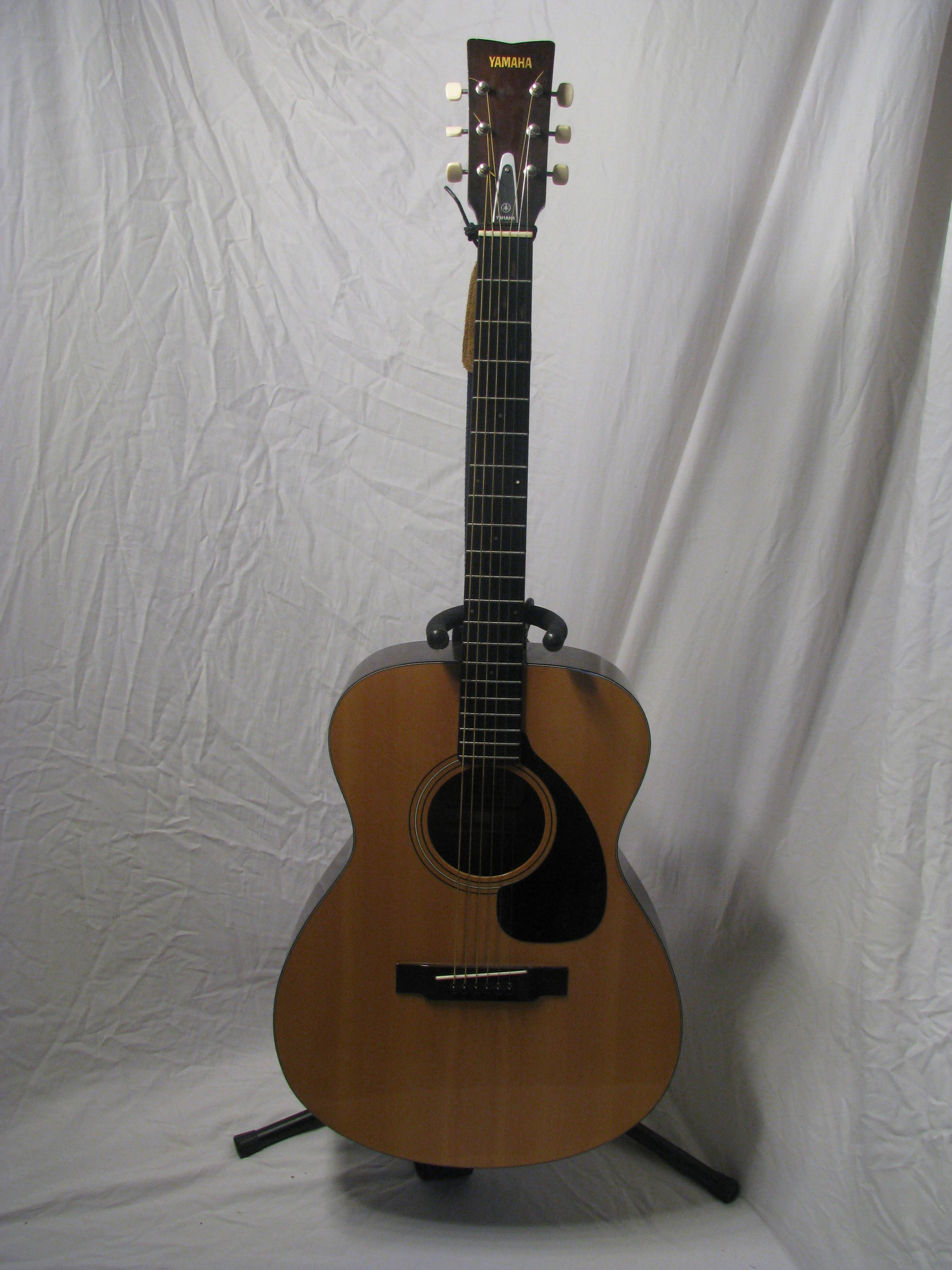
FG-110

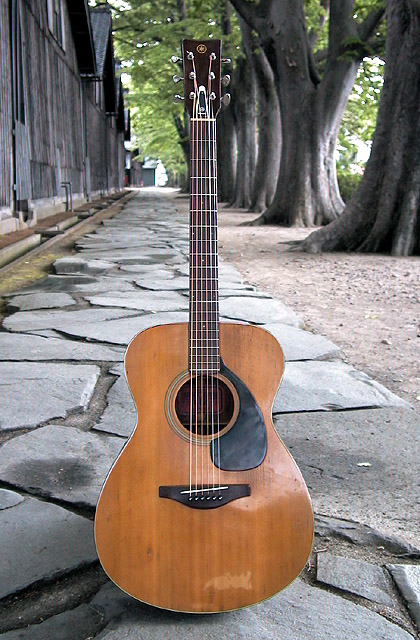
FG-150

- FG-75 (c. 1969R2, slightly small (length 40 inches))
- FG-75 1
- FG-110 (c. 1968R, folk)
- FG-120F (1974/1975 size 00 Black Label)
- FG-130 (1972G, folk)
- FG-140 (c. 1969R, '68jumbo)
- FG-150 / FG-150F (c. 1968R/1974B, folk)
- FG-151 / FG-151B (1976/1978, western)
- FG-152 (1976, folk)
- FG-160 (1972G, jumbo)
- FG-170 (1972G, folk)
- FG-180 (c. 1968R, '68jumbo)
- FG-180J (1974B, jumbo)
- FG-200 / FG-200J (1972G/1974B, jumbo)
- FG-200F (1974B, folk)
- FG-200D (1981, yamaha western)
- FG-201 / FG-201B (1976/1978, western)
- FG-202 / FG-202B / FG-202D (1976/1978/1981, folk)
- FG-220 (c. 1969R2, '68jumbo)

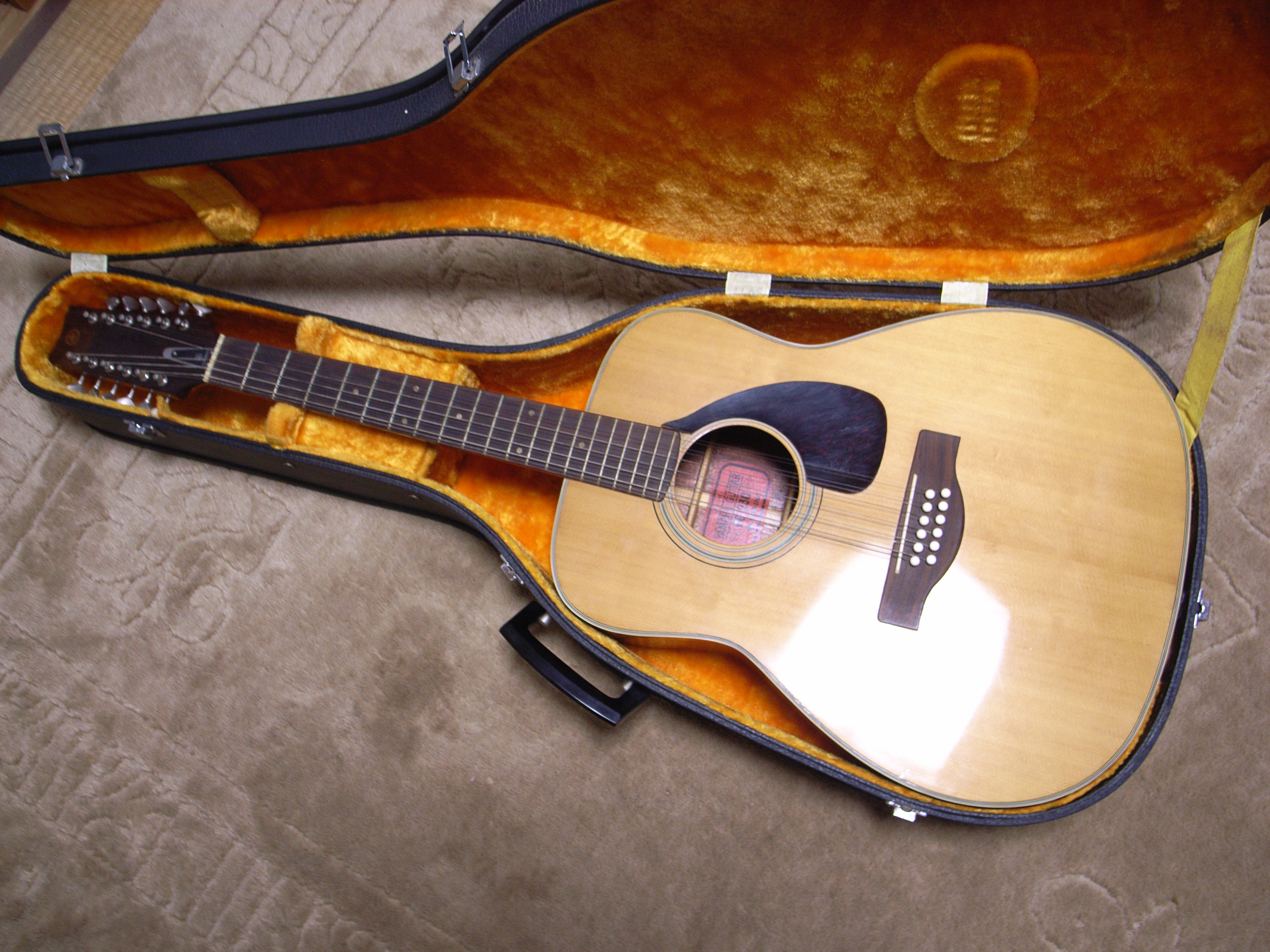
FG-230

- FG-230 (c. 1968R, 12strings '68jumbo)
- FG-240 (1972G, jumbo)
- FG-250 / FG-250F (1972G/1974B, folk)
- FG-250J (1974B, jumbo)
- FG-250D / FG-250M / FG-250S (1981/1984, yamaha western, M = mahogany side & back, S = sunburst)
- FG12-250 (1981, 12strings yamaha western)
- FG-251 / FG-251B (1976/1978, western)
- FG-252 / FG-252B / FG-252D / FG-252C (1976/1978/1981/1984, folk)
- FG-260 (1972G, 12strings jumbo)
- FG-280 (c. 1969R2/1972G, '68jumbo)
- FG-300 (c. 1969R2, '68jumbo)
- FG-300J (1974B, jumbo)
- FG-300N (1974/1975, jumbo, N = jacaranda sides & back)
- FG-300D / FG-300DE (1981, yamaha western, E = 2way piezo electric)
- FG-300S / FG-300M (1981/1984, yamaha western, S = sunburst, M = mahogany side & back)
- FG-12-300 (1974B, 12strings jumbo)
- FG-301 / FG-301B (1976/1978, western)
- FG12-301 / FG12-301B (1976/1980, 12strings western)
- FG-302 / FG-302B / FG-302D / FG-302C (1976/1978/1981/1984, folk)
- FG-303 / FG-303E (1981, semi-jumbo, E = 2way piezo electric)
- FG-310
- FG-325
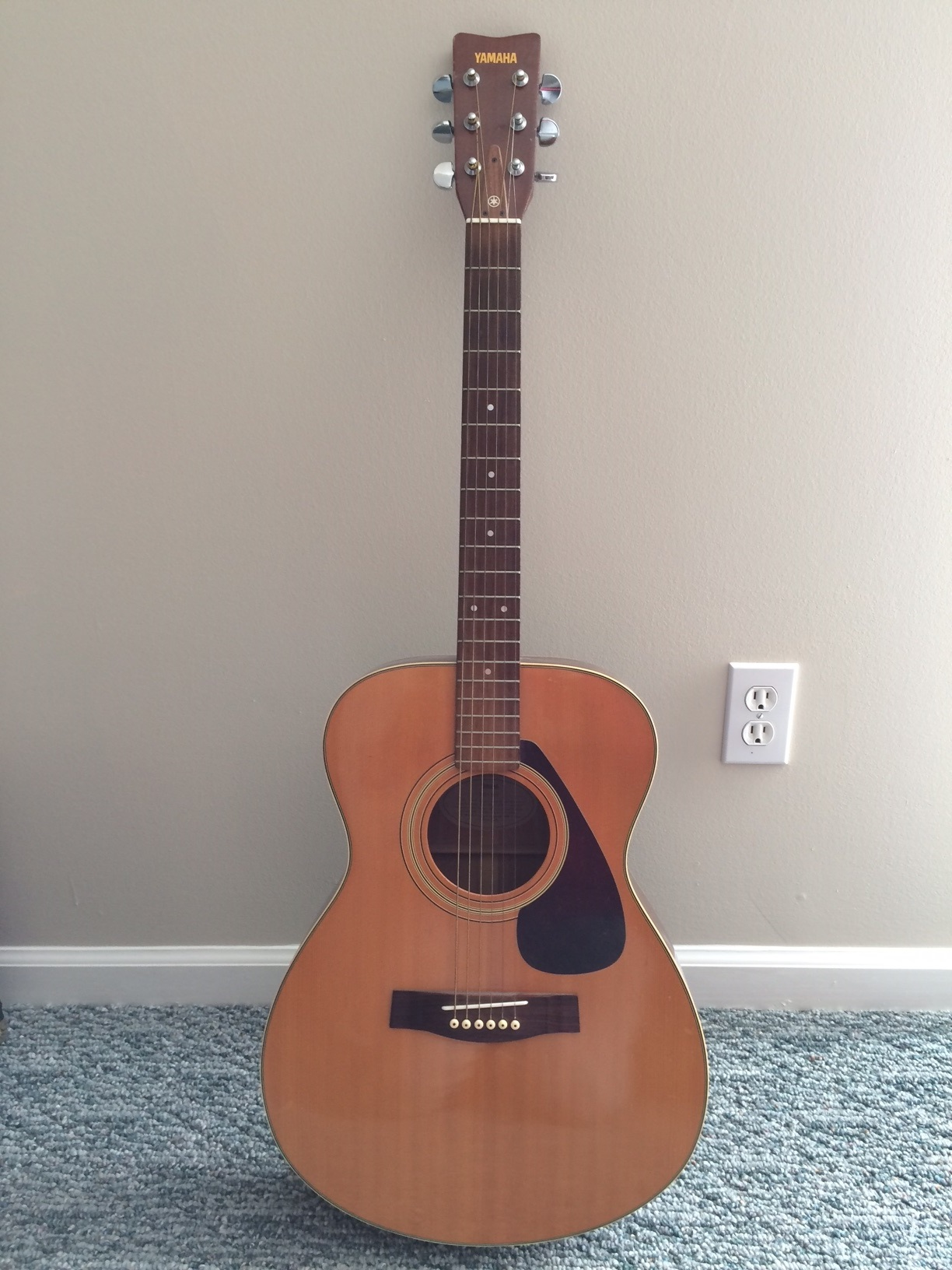
- Yamaha FG-331 acoustic guitar
  FG-331
- FG-332
- FG-335
- FG-335 II
- FG-340 (1972G, folk)
- FG-340 II (1981–85, western)
- FG-345 II (1981–1985)
- FG-350 (c. 1969R, '68jumbo)
- FG-350F (1974B, folk)
- FG-350J (1974B, jumbo)
- FG-350E (1972G2, western style jumbo, E = magnetic electric (Gibson J-160E style))
- FG-350D (1981, yamaha western)
- FG12-350 (1981, 12strings yamaha western)
- FG-351 / FG-351B (1976/1978, western)
- FG-360 (1972G, jumbo)

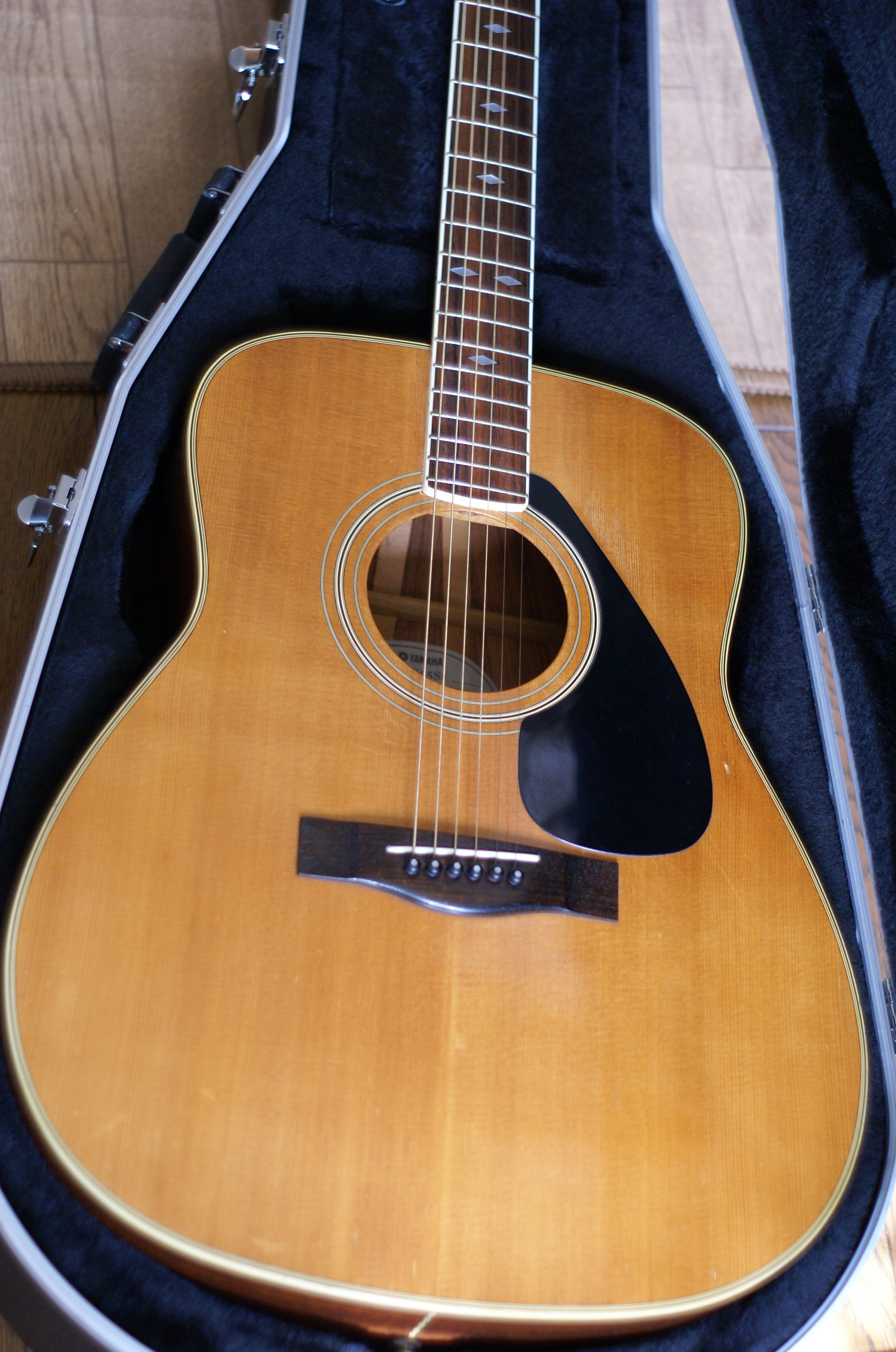
FG-365SII

- FG-400
- FG-400J (1974B, jumbo)
- FG-400W (1974B, western style jumbo)
- FG-400D / FG-400S / FG-400M (1981/1981/1984, yamaha western, S = sunburst, M = mahogany side & back)
- FG-401
- FG-401B (1978, western)
- FG-401W / FG-401WB (1976/1980, western, western style)
- FG-402 /FG-402B / FG-402C (1976/1978/1984, folk)
- FG-403 (1981, semi-jumbo)
- FG-410A
- FG-411S
- FG-412 BL
- FG-420
- FG-420A
- FG-420-12A (12 String)
- FG-430
- FG-440 (1972G, folk)
- FG-441
- FG-450 (1972G, jumbo)
- FG-450E (1974B, western style jumbo, E = magnetic electric (J-160E style))
- FG-455
- FG-460-12 (12 string)
- FG-461
- FG-500 (c. 1969R, '68jumbo)
- FG-500F (1974B, folk)
- FG-500J (1974B, jumbo)
- FG-500S (1981, yamaha western, S = sunburst)
- FG-550 (c. 1969R, 12strings '68jumbo)
- FG-580 (1972G2, new jumbo)
- FG-600S (1972G2, folk, western style, S = sunburst)
- FG-600J (1974B, HQ jumbo)
- FG-612S (1981–1985, 12strings)
- FG-630 (1972G2, 12strings new jumbo)
- FG-700 (1972G2, new jumbo)
- FG-700S (1974B, western style jumbo, S = sunburst)

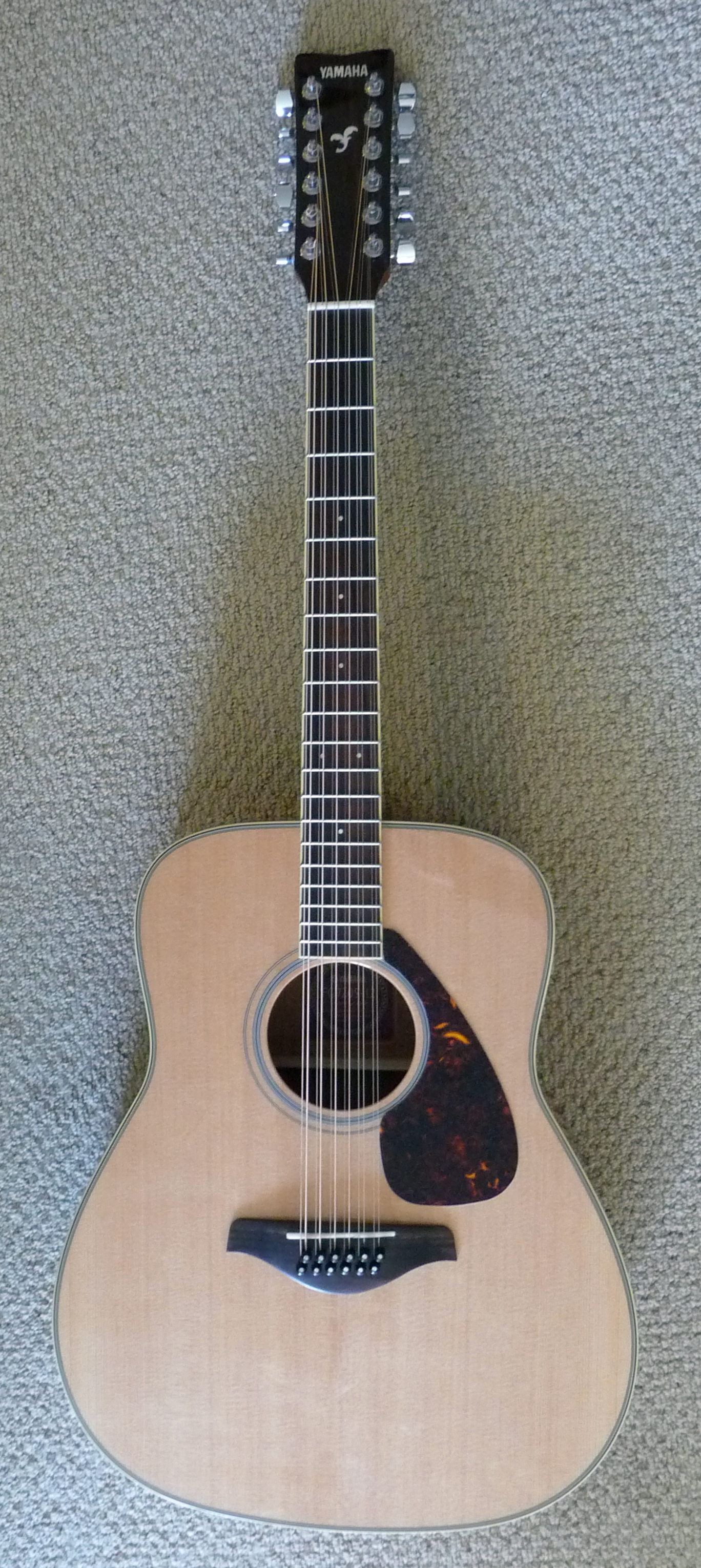
FG720S-12

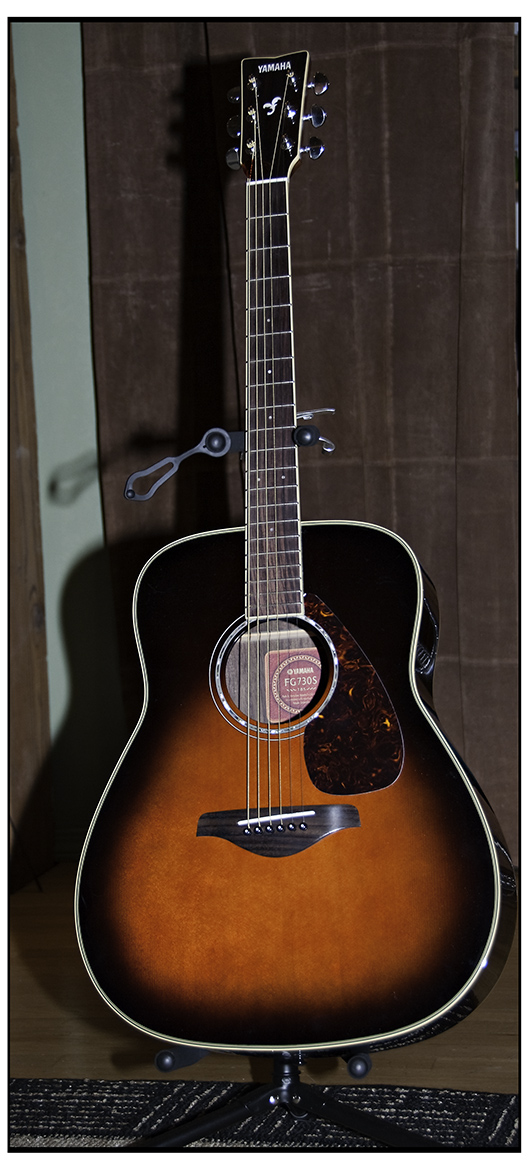
FG730S

- FG-720S
- FG-720S-12 (12strings)
- FG-730S
- FG-750S
- FG-800J (1974B, HQ jumbo)
- FG-12-800 (1974B, 12strings HQ jumbo)
- FG-850 (1972G2, new jumbo)
- FG-1000 (1972G2, new jumbo)
- FG-1000J (1974B, HQ jumbo)
- FG-1200J (1974B, HQ jumbo)
- FG-1200S / FG-1200SN (1974, western style jumbo (Gibson Dove style), S = sunburst, SN = natural)
- FG-1500 (1972G2, folk)
- FG-2000 (1972G2, new jumbo)
- FG-2500 (1972G2, 12strings new jumbo)

FX series

- FX-170A (1984, yamaha jumbo, limited entry model)

L series
(finishes: S,S* = sunburst, T = satin wood color ?)
E = electric acoustic model with piezo pickup systems:

E in 1980: piezo pickup (bar type under saddle) + 3 controls (bass, treble, volume)
E in 1981: 2way piezo pickups (bar type under saddle & dot type under lower end-pin) + 3 or 4 controls (bass, treble, volume, and mix (PMSII on L-10E))

- L-5 / L-5S / L-5T (1976/1976/1984)
- L-5A (1978–1984)
- L-5ES / L-5E / L-5SE (1980/1981, yamaha western, ES = piezo electric, E/SE = 2way piezo electric)
- L12-5 / L12-5A (1976/1980, 12strings yamaha western)
- L-6 (1976, yamaha western)
- L12-6 / L12-6E (1981, 12strings yamaha western, E = 2way piezo electric)
- L-7S (1976, yamaha western, western style (Gibson Dove style))
- L-8 / L-8S (1976/1981, yamaha western)
- L12-8 / L12-8A (1976/1980, 12strings yamaha western)
- L-10 / L-10S / L-10T (1976/1976/1984, yamaha western)
- L-10ES / L-10E (1980/1981, yamaha western, ES = piezo electric + sunburst, E = 2way piezo electric + 4way controls (PMS II))
- L-12S / L-12SN (1976, yamaha western, western style (Gibson Dove style), S = sunburst, SN = natural)
- L-15 (1976/1980, yamaha western/yamaha jumbo)
- L-21A (1984, jumbo, A = old finish)
- L-31 / L-31A (1974/1978, HQ jumbo/yamaha jumbo, A = old finish)
- L-41 (1980, yamaha western)

L series custom made

- L12-50 Custom (1980, 12strings yamaha jumbo)
- L-51 (1974, custom I/custom A)
- L-52 / CJ-52 Custom (1974/1980, custom II/custom B/country jumbo (Gibson Everly Brothers style))
- L-53 (1974, custom III/custom C)
- L-53 Custom (1980, yamaha jumbo)
- L-54 (1974, custom IV/custom D, western style (Gibson Dove style))
- L-55 Custom (1980, yamaha jumbo)

LA series
luxury artist model, based on L series (original LA shape)

- LA-17 (1984)
- LA-27 (1984)
- LA-37 (1984)
- LA12-37 (1984, 12strings)
- LA-47 (1984)
- LA-57 Custom (1984)

LJ series

- LJ6 (China)
- LJ16 (China)
- LJ26 (Japan)
- LJ36 (Japan)

LL series

- LL6, LLX6 (China, X = electric)
- LL16, LLX16, LLX16C (China, X = electric, C = cutaway)
- LL26, LLX26C (Japan, X = electric, C = cutaway)
- LL36, LLX36C (Japan, X = electric, C = cutaway)

LS series

- LS6 (China)
- LS16 (China)
- LS26 (Japan)
- LS36 (Japan)

CJ series

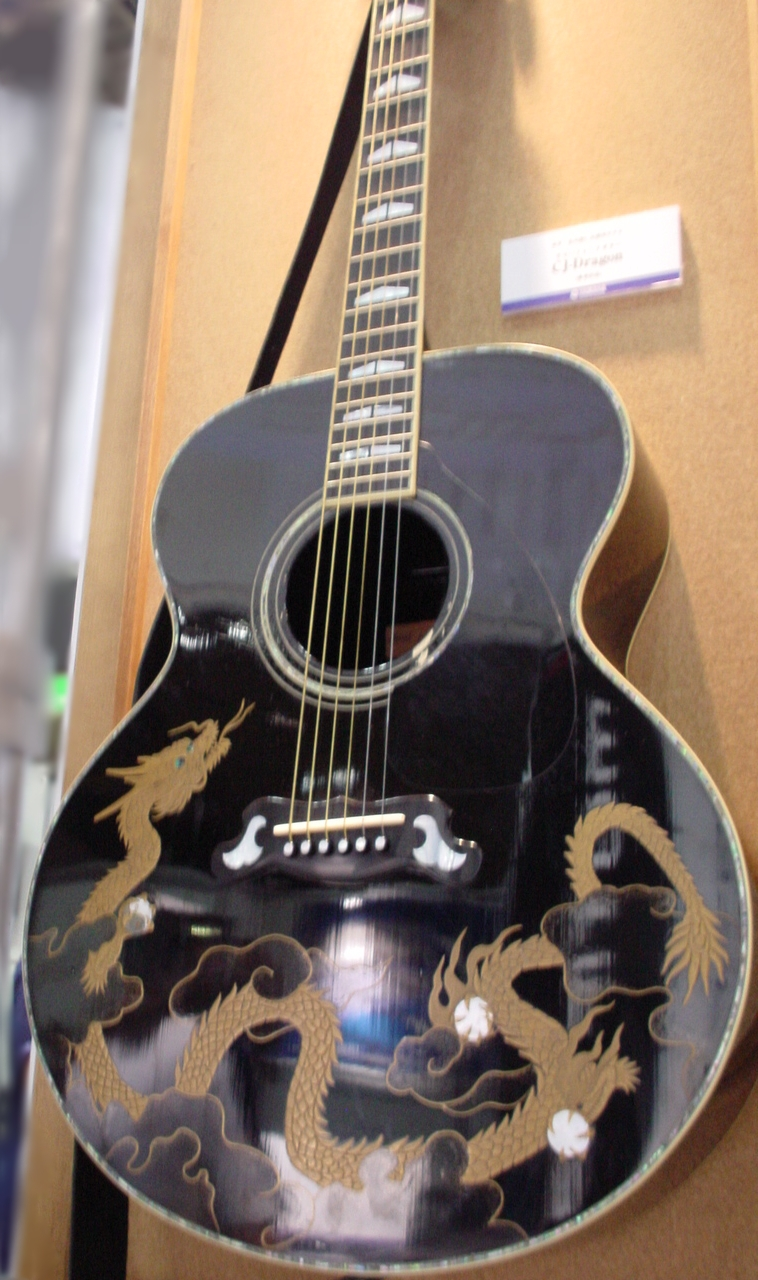
CJ Custom
(Dragon Guitar)

Yamaha original country jumbo (Gibson J-200 style)

- CJ-7 (1978–1983)
- CJ-8XE (1981, Gibson Everly Brothers style, XE = 2way piezo electric)
- CJ-10, CJ-10B (1978–1983, B = brown burst)
- CJ-12 (1993–2007)
- CJ-12P BL (1997–2007)
- CJ-15 / CJ-15B (1978–1983, B = brown burst)
- CJ-22 (1992–2007)
- CJ-32 (1994–2009)
- CJ-52 Custom (1980–1988, Gibson Everly Brothers style)

CP series
popular type (classical guitar)

- CP-300 (1978)
- CP-400 (1978)
- CP-500 (1978)

CWE series
electric acoustic model with single cutaway, semi-jumbo shallow body, 22 frets, piezo pickup system

PMS IV: 2way pickup + 4controls
PMS V: bar piezo + 3controls

- CWE-8 (c. 1984)
- CWE-18 (1984, PMS V)
- CWE-18C (1984, PMS IV, gut string)
- CWE-28 (1984, PMS IV)
- CWE-58 (1984, PMS IV)

N series

- N500 (1976, yamaha western)
- N700 (1976, yamaha western)
- N1000 (1976, yamaha western)

S series
yamaha original semi-jumbo

- S-11 / S-11E (1980/1981, yamaha semi-jumbo, E = 2way piezo electric)
- S-21 (1980, yamaha semi-jumbo)
- S-51 Custom (1980, yamaha semi-jumbo)

SJ series

- SJ-180 (1981–1985, yamaha semi-jumbo)

XS series
yamaha original semi-jumbo, based on CJ-52 Custom/L-52/CJ-8XE line

- XS-16Black (1982, semi-jumbo)
- XS-26E Black (1982, semi-jumbo, E = 2way piezo electric + 4way controls)
- XS-56E Black (1982, semi-jumbo, E = 2way piezo electric + 4way controls (PMS II))

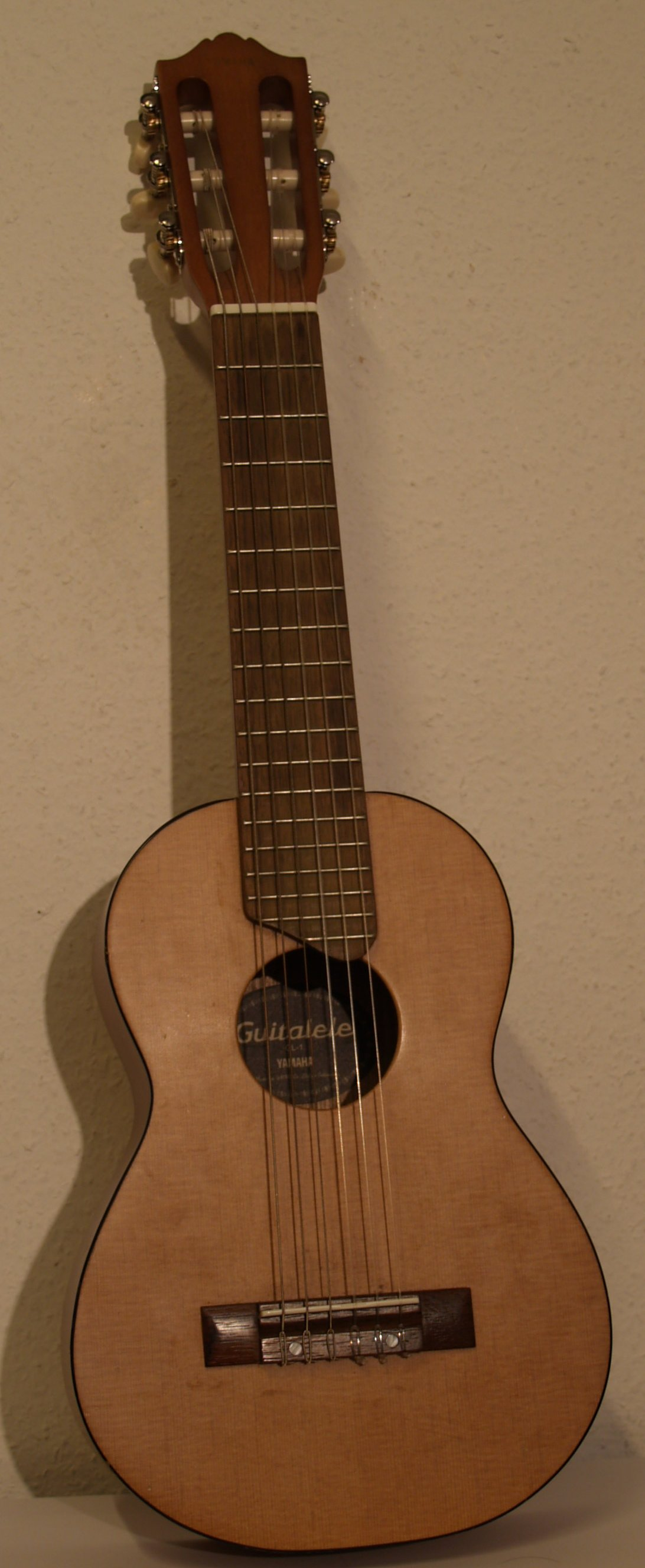
Guitalele
GL-1

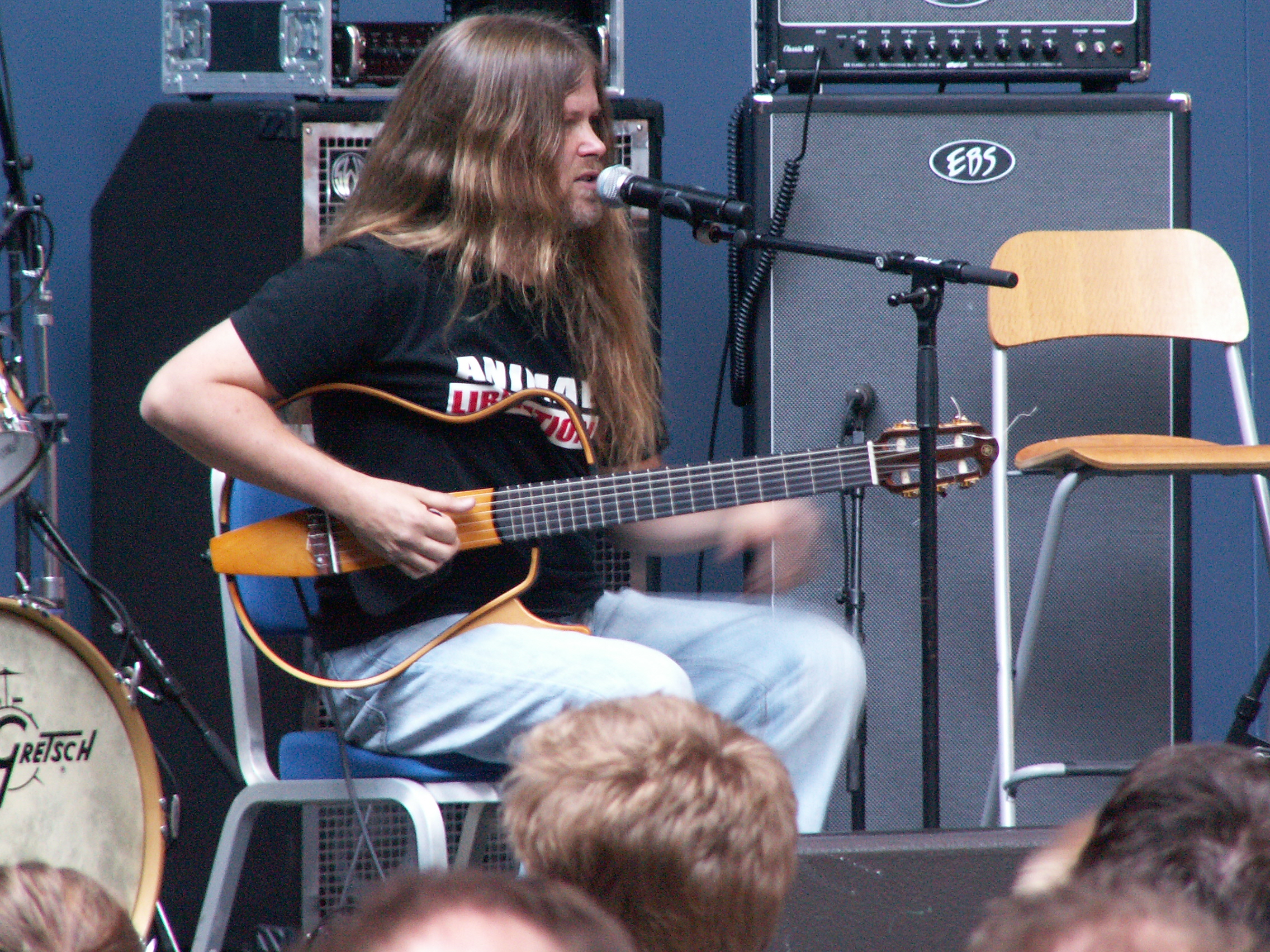
Mattias Eklundh playing Yamaha Silent Guitar on Clinic

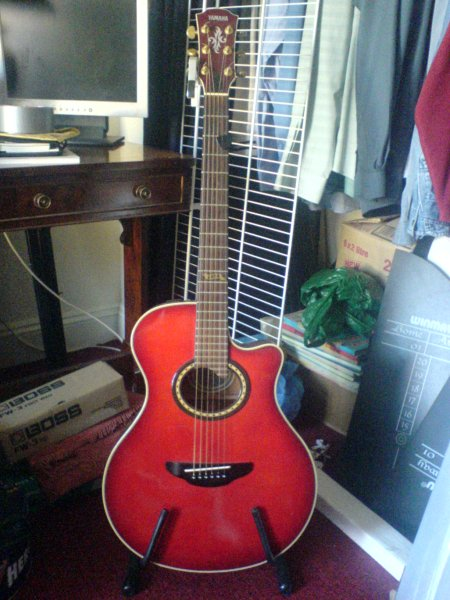
APX1996

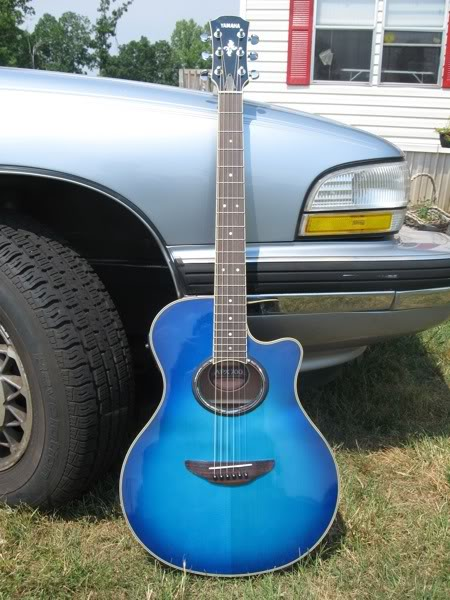
APX700

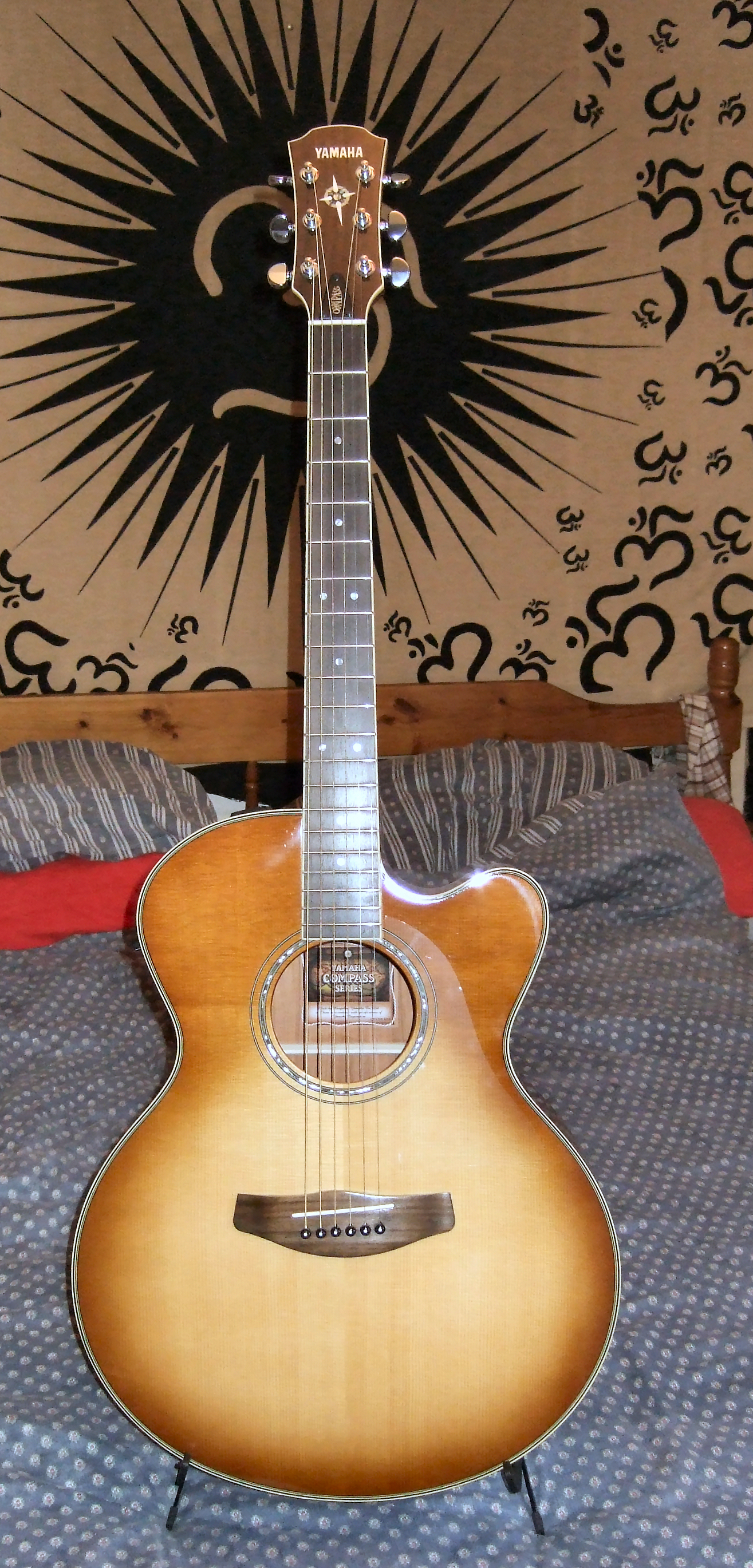
CPX700

==== Guitalele ====
- GL-1
- JR1

==== Silent guitars ====
- SLG-100N
- SLG-100S
- SLG-110N
- SLG-110S
- SLG-130NW
- SLG-200S
- SLG-200N
- SLG-200NW

==== Electric-acoustic guitars ====
- 5A
- APX series
- CPX series
- FAX
- FGX/FJX
- FX
- LX
- NTX

==== Electric guitars ====
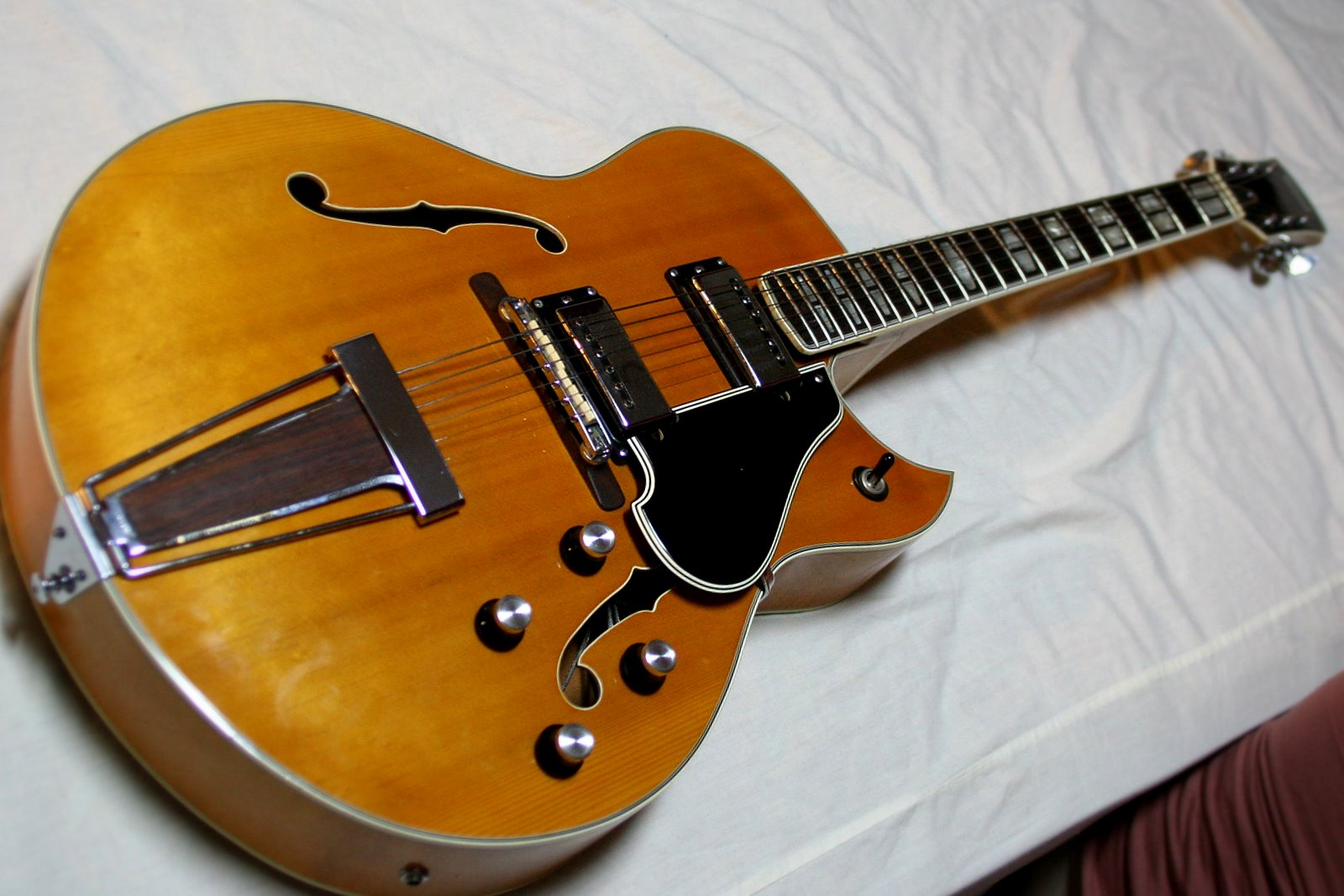
AE11

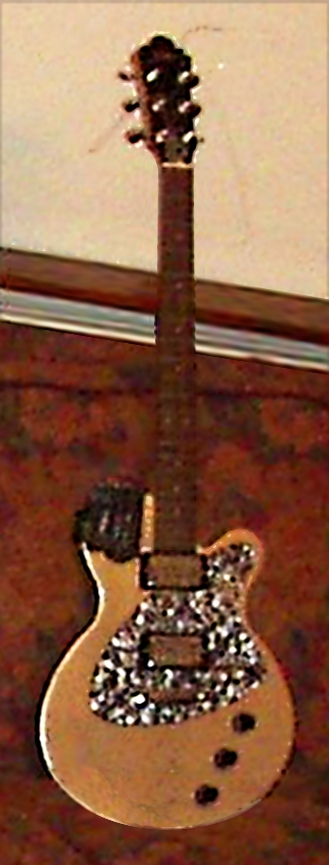
AES500

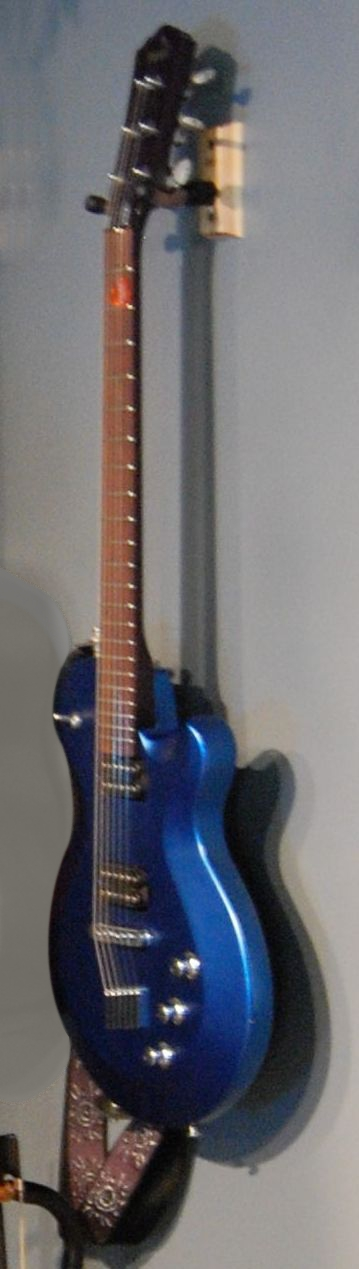
AES820

AE series
full hollow body, single cutaway

- AE-11 (1967)
- AE-12 (1972)
- AE-18 (1972)
- AE-500
- AE-1200 (1978)
- AE-1200S2 (1989)
- AE-1200T (1979)
- AE-1500 (1991)
- AE-2000 (1978)
- AEX500N2 (1998)
- AEX1500 (c. 1994)

AES series
thinline hollow body, single cutaway

- AES-500
- AES620 Sammy Hagar signature
- AES-620
- AES-620HB
- AES-720
- AES-820 (2002)
- AES1500
- AES1500B

CV series

- CV820WB Wes Borland signature

EG series

- EG-012
- EG-112
- EG-303

ERG series

- ERG-121

EX series
Explorer shape

- EX-1 / EX-2 (1985)

GX series
headless guitars

- GX1 (1986)

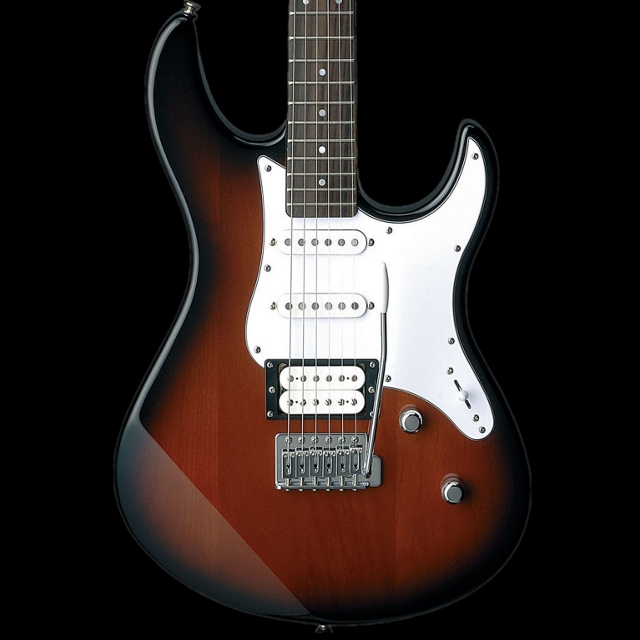
Pacifica 112V

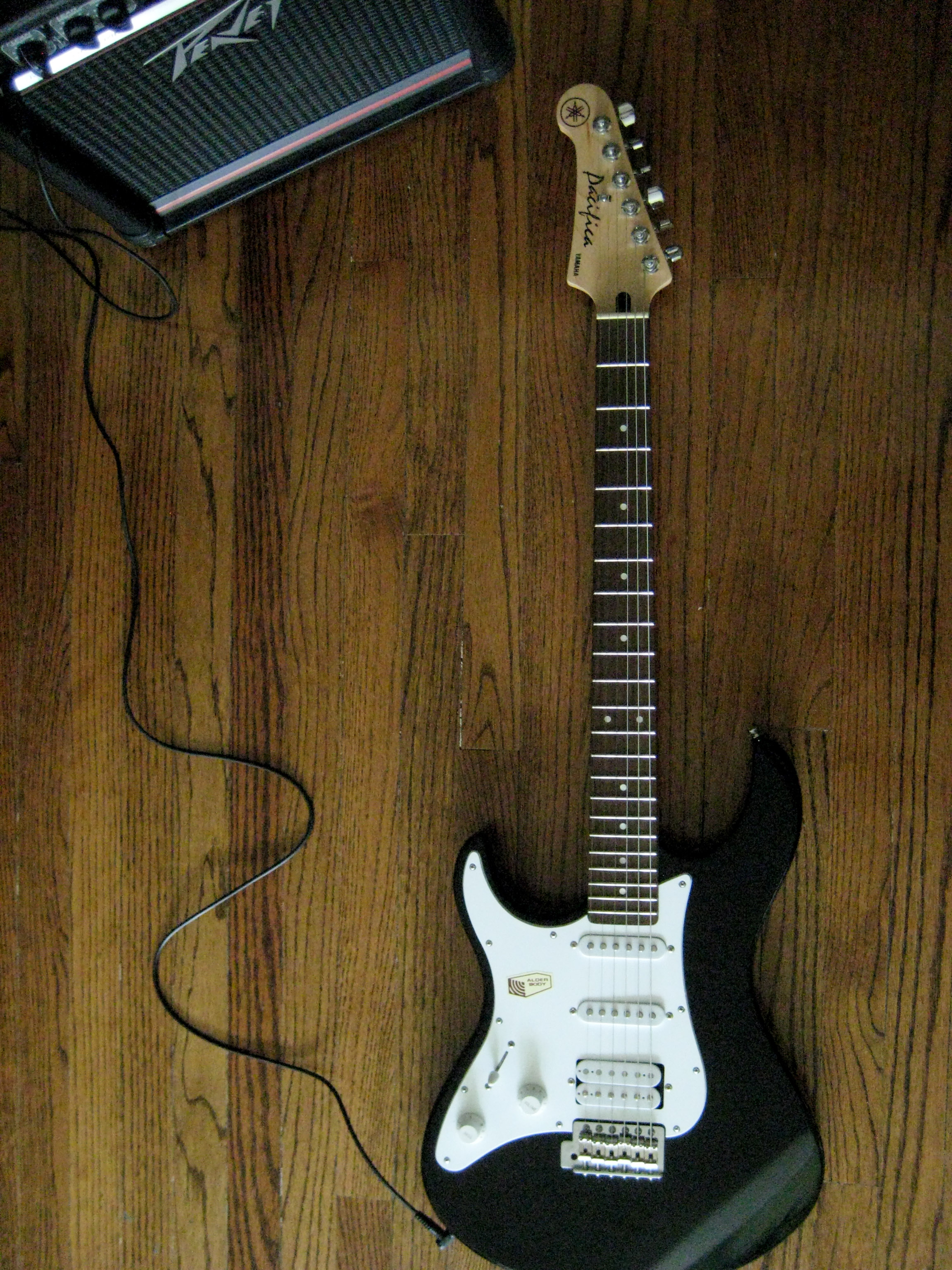
Pacifica 112JL

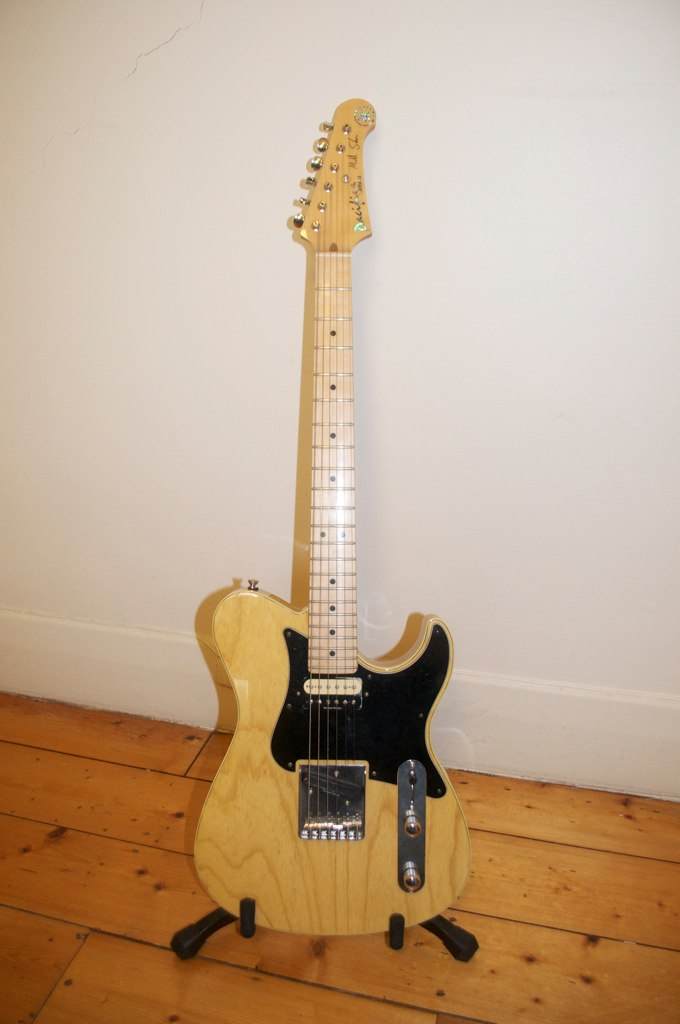
Pacifica PAC1511MS Mike Stern signature

Pacifica

- PAC012
- PAC112J
- PAC112JL
- PAC112V
- PAC302S
- PAC412V
- PAC612V
- PAC812V
- PAC904
- PAC1221M
- PAC1511MS Mike Stern signature

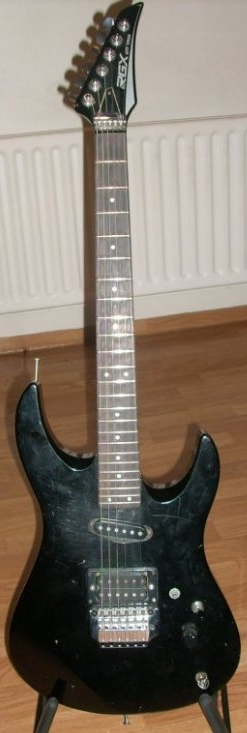
RGX211

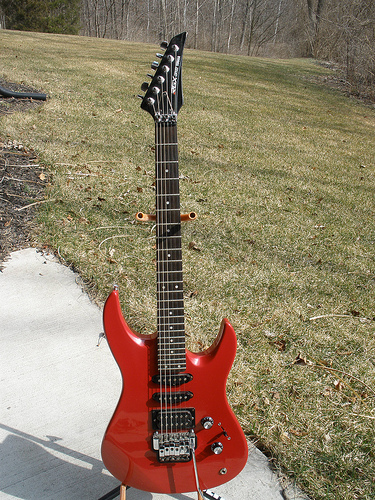
RGX312

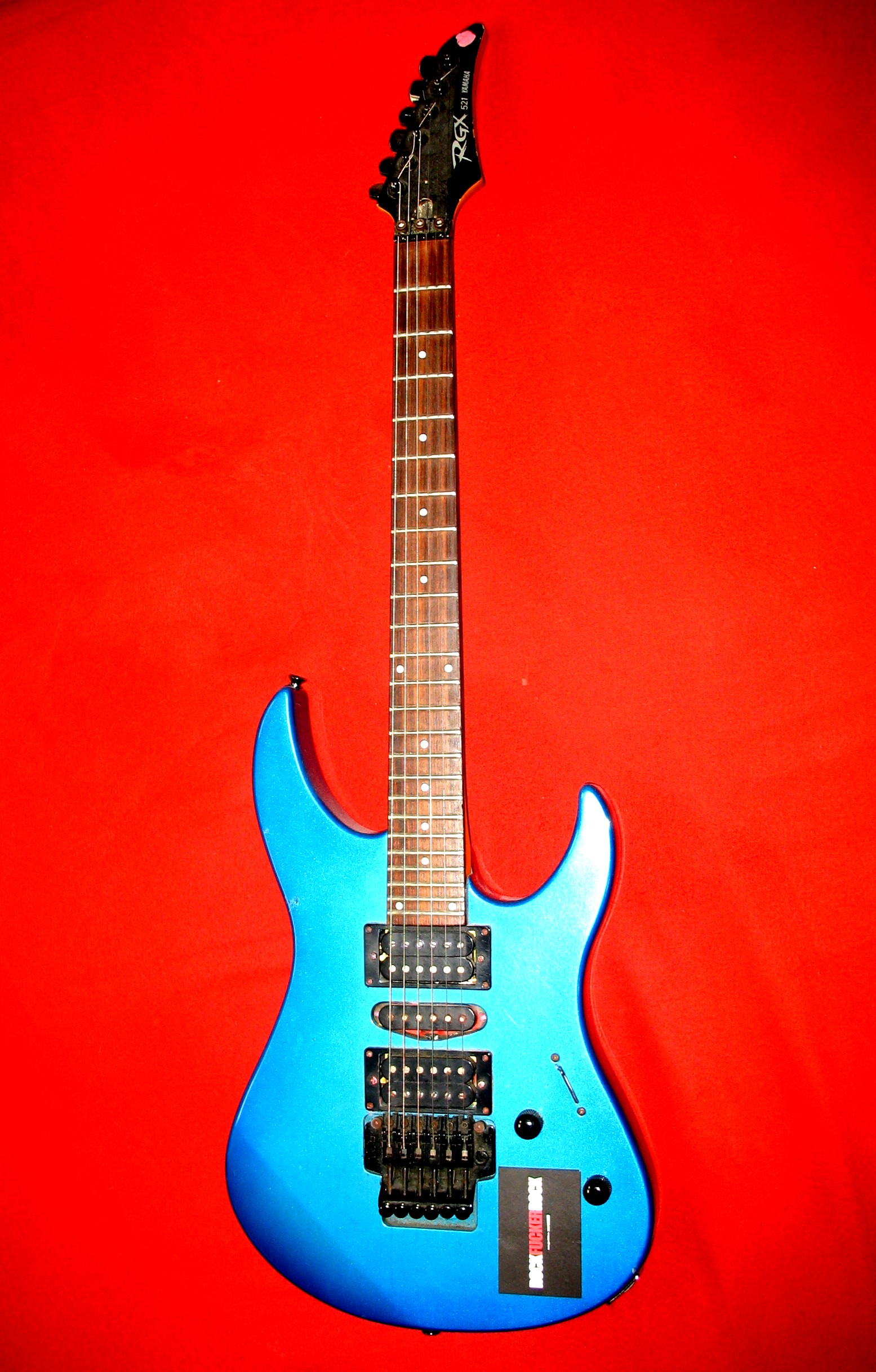
RGX521D

RGX series

Super Strat type

- RGX110
- RGX120D
- RGX121z
- RGX211
- RGX312
- RGX420DZ
- RGX421D
- RGX512J
- RGX721D
- RGXA2

RGZ series

- RGZ321P

SA series
thinline hollow body, double cutaway

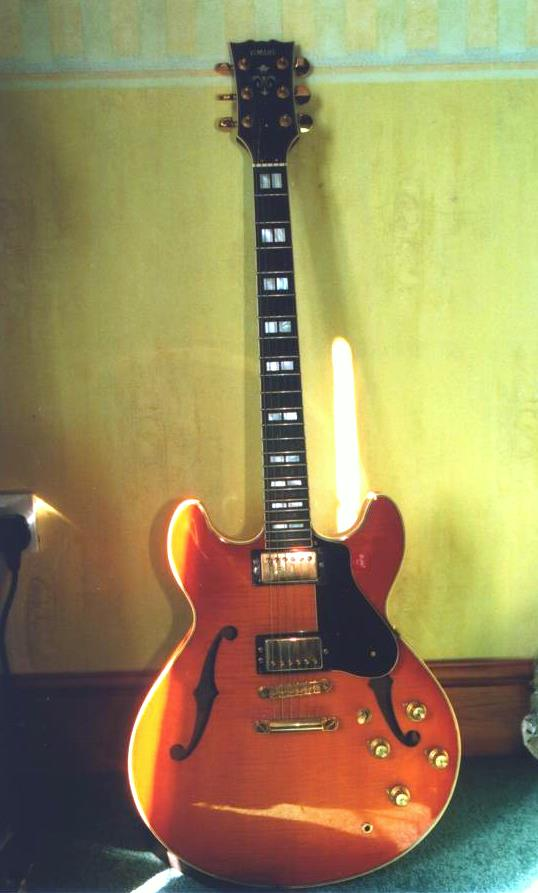
SA2200

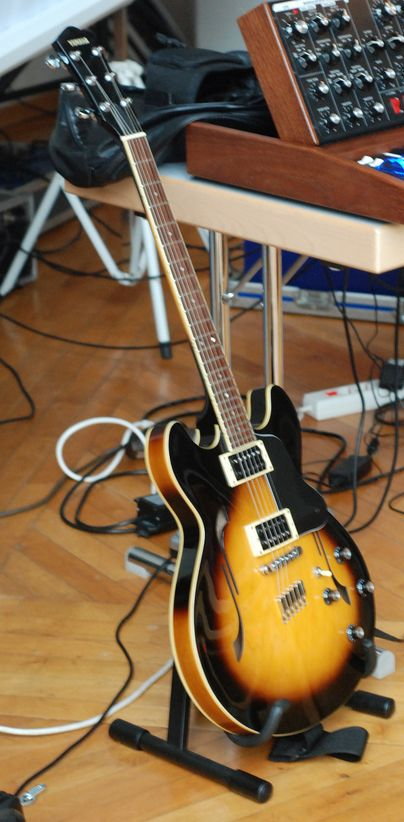
SA500

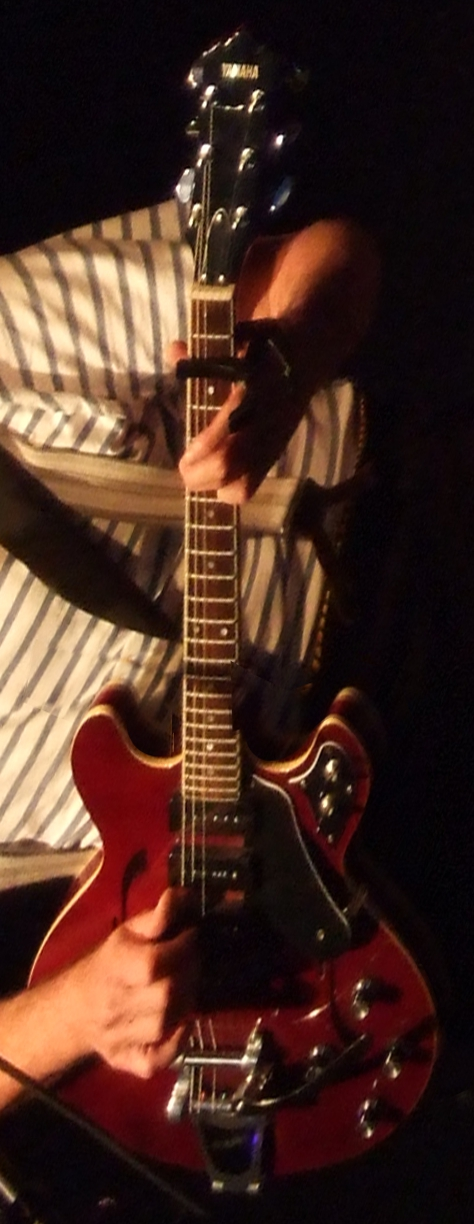
SA503TVL

- SA-5 / SA-5B (1966)
- SA-20 / SA-20B (1968, 12strings,
  B = pearl color)
- SA-30 / SA-30T (c. 1968, export model?)
- SA-50 / SA-50B (1967, tremolo,
  B = pearl or sycamore)
- SA-60 (1973)
- SA-90 (1973)
- SA-500 (2005, Art Deco f-holes)
- SA-503 TVL Troy Van Leeuwen signature
- SA-700 (1977)
- SA-900 (1983)
- SA-1000 (1977)
- SA-1100 (1988)
- SA-1200S (1972)
- SA-1300 (1983)
- SA-1800 / SA-1800L (1983, L = left hand)
- SA-2000 / SA-2000S (1977/1979)
- SA-2100II (1988)
- SA2200
- SA-2500 (1983)
- SAS-I / SAS-II / SAS-III (1988, small body)
- SAS-1500

SA series (Rickenbacker type)
semi-acoustic guitars similar to Rickenbacker

- SA-15 / SA-15D (1968)
- SA-RR Custom (1989, with Telecaster bridge)

SC series

- SC-700 (1977)
- SC-800 (1977)
- SC-1000 (1977)
- SC-1200 (1977)
- SC-3000 (1980, SF shape)
- SC-5000 (1980, SF shape)
- SC-7000 (1980, SF shape)

SE series

- SE-110
- SE-150
- SE-200
- SE-203
- SE-211
- SE-250
- SE-300 / SE-300H
- SE-350 / SE-350H
- SE-603M
- SE-612 / SE-612A
- SE-700HE (1985)
- SE-700M
- SE-903A
- SE-1203 / SE-1203a
- SE-1212 / SE-1212a
- SE-1220 / SE-1220a

Session series

- Session 503 (1985)
- Session 512 (1985)
- Session 520 (1985)

SF series

- SF-400
- SF-500 (1980)
- SF550
- SF-600
- SF-700 (1977)
- SF-1000 (1977)
- SF-3000 (1980)
- SF-5000 (1980)
- SF-7000 (1980)
- SFX-I (1985)
- SFX-II (1985)
- SFX-III (1985)

===== SG series (earlier) =====
earlier SG series (Note: "YouTube - Yamaha SG Guitar History". YouTube. 9 July 2008. Archived from the original on 5 July 2015. (video))

- SG-2 (1966, asymmetrical double cutaway 1)
- SG-3 (1966, asymmetrical double cutaway 2)

1966-67 SG reverse cutaway

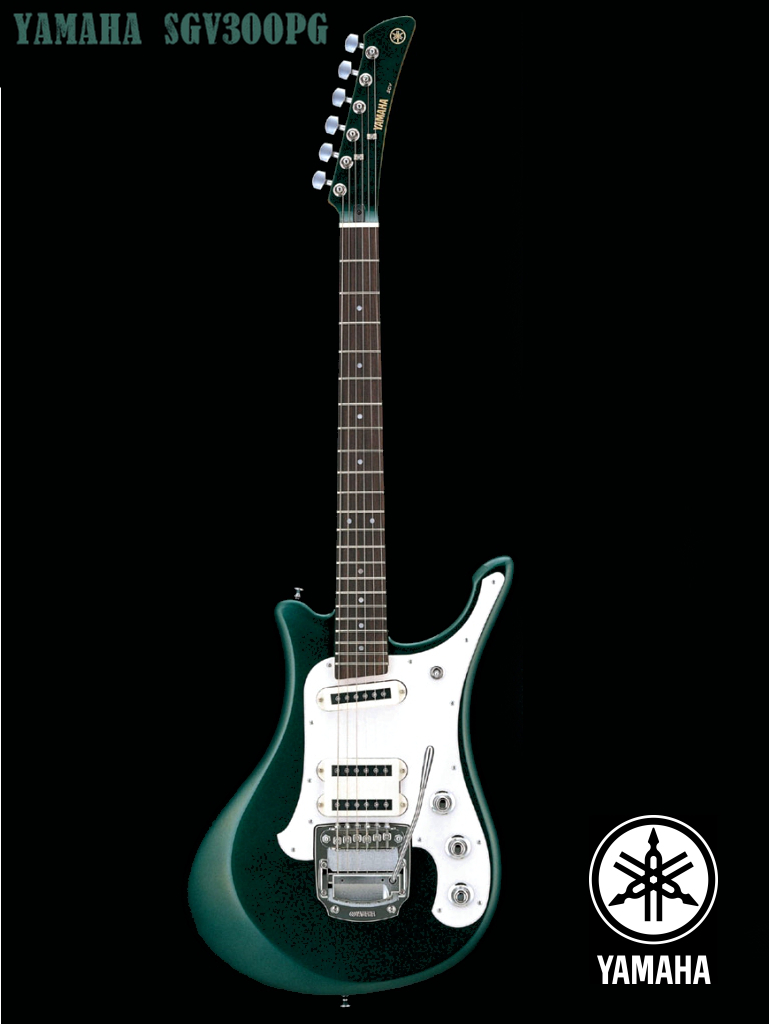
SGV300PG (2000)

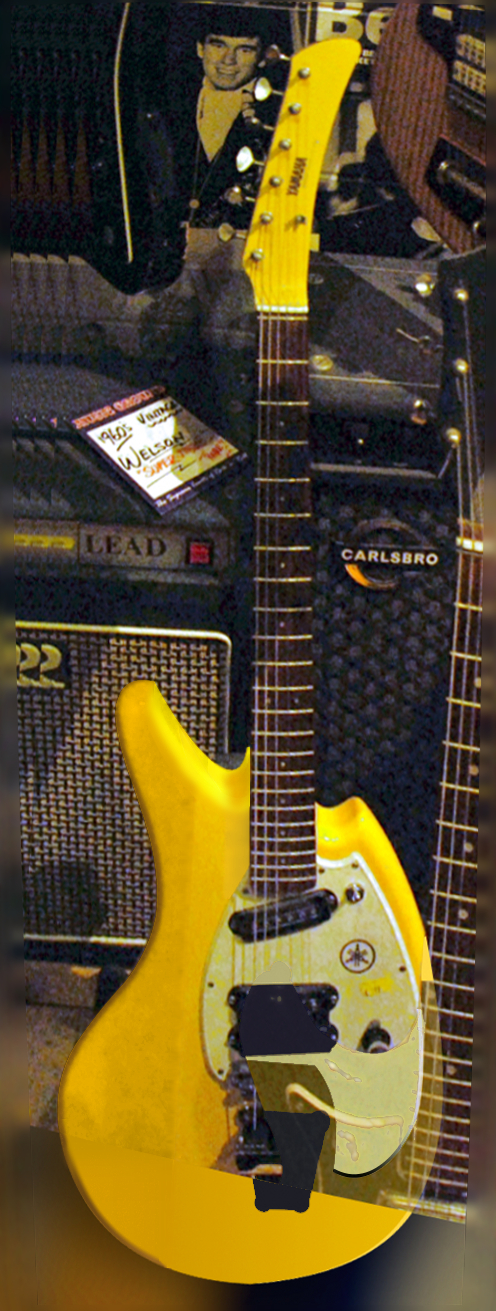
SG-3C (1967)

- SG-5 (1966)
- SG-7 (1966)
- SG-2A (1967)
- SG-5A (1967)
- SG-7A (1967)
- SG-12A (1967)
- SG-7AS (1996)
- SG-12AS (1996)
- BJ PRO (2000)
- BJ PRO 12 (2002)

1968 SG non-reverse cutaway

- SG-2C (1968)
- SG-3C (1968)

1972 SG single cutaway

- SG-40
- SG-60 / SG-60T (c. 1973, German carved, T = tremolo) (Note: "Yamaha SG-60T (1973)". The guitar collection. Archived from the original on 2 May 2011. - featured in Guitarist (magazine), Sept. 2006.)
- SG-80 (German carved, tone selector)
- SG-45
- SG-65
- SG-85

===== SGV series =====
Asymmetrical double cutaway guitar based on earlier SG-2, 5/5A, 7/7A [see above], manufactured in early 2000s

- SGV-300
- SGV-500
- SGV-700 (Japan only)
- SGV-800 (2000)
- SGV-1200 (Japan only)(2001)
- SGV Blue Jeans (Japan only)

===== SG series (stable) =====
1973-74 SG series (with different pickguard shape)

- SG-30 (1973, Katsura-wood, bolt-on neck, dot inlays)
- SG-35 (1973, Natoh mahogany, bolt-on neck, parallelogram inlays)
- SG-30A (1974, maple body SG-30)
- SG-35A (1974, maple body SG-35)
- SG-50 (1974, set-in neck, dot inlays, large pickguard)
- SG-70 (1974, mahogany body SG-50)
- SG-90 (1974, mahogany carved-top with top binding, set-in neck)

Stable SG series (SG-2000 shape)

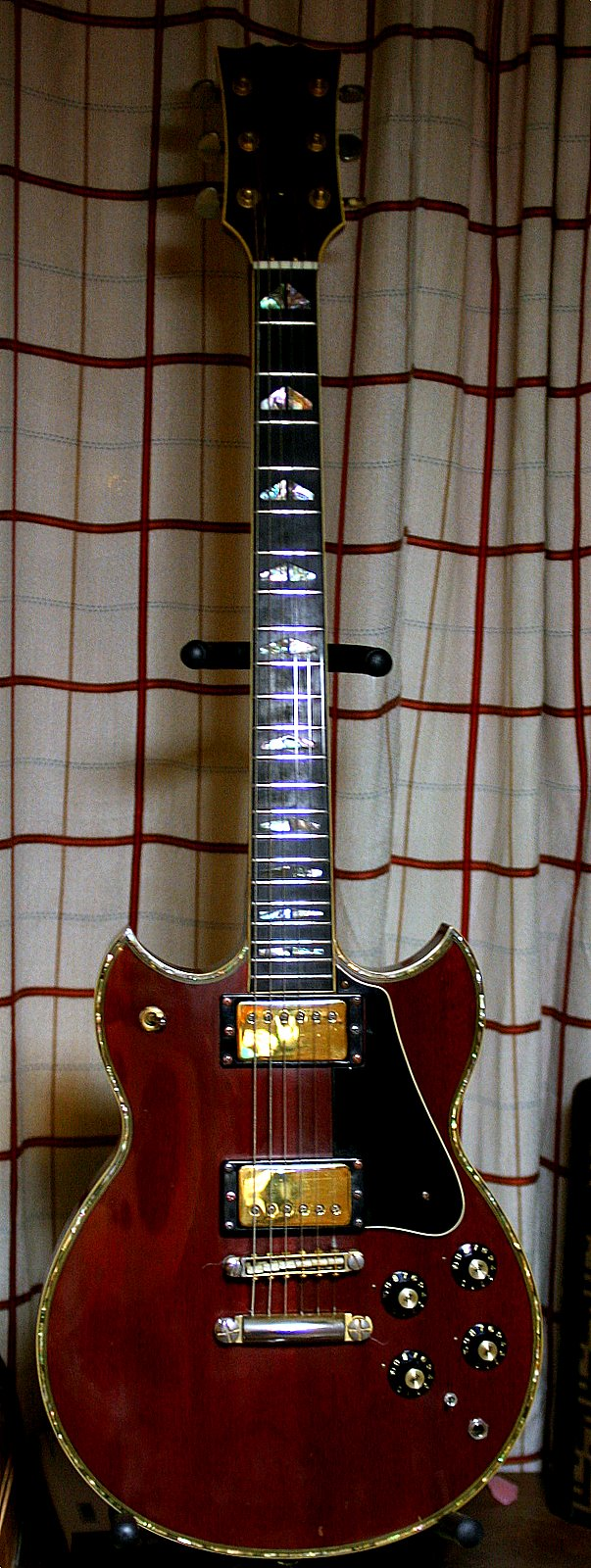
SG-175 (1974)

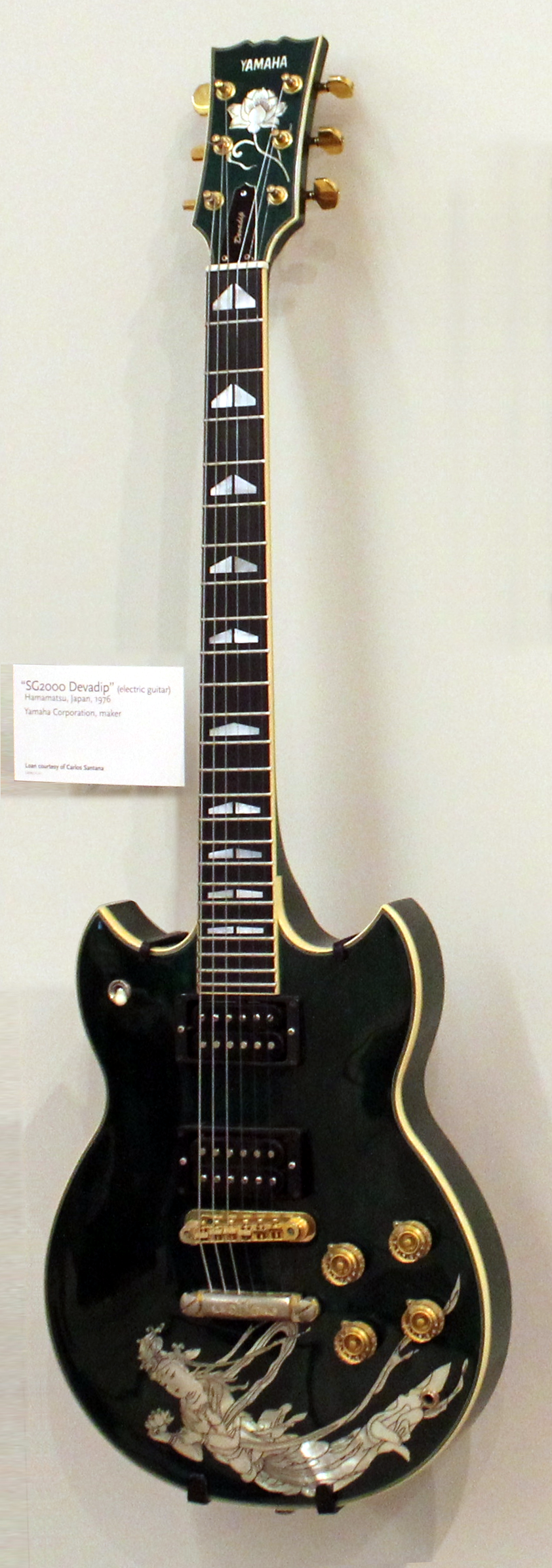
SG2000 Devadip (1976)

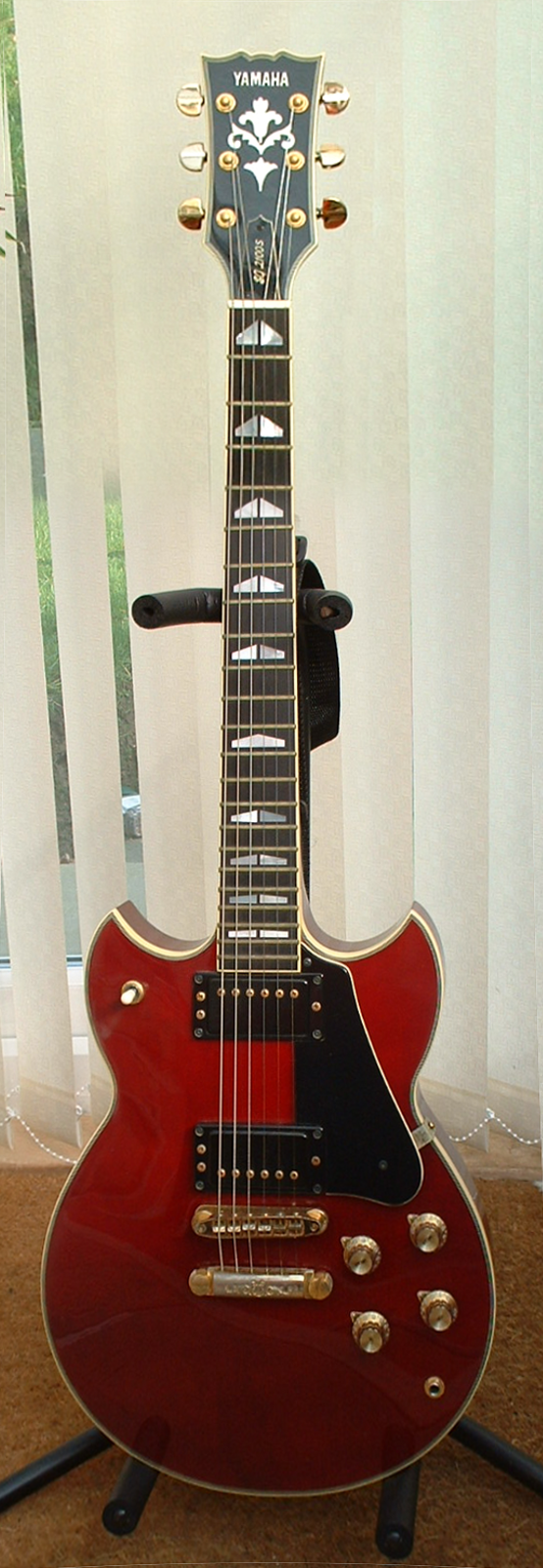
SG2100S (1984)

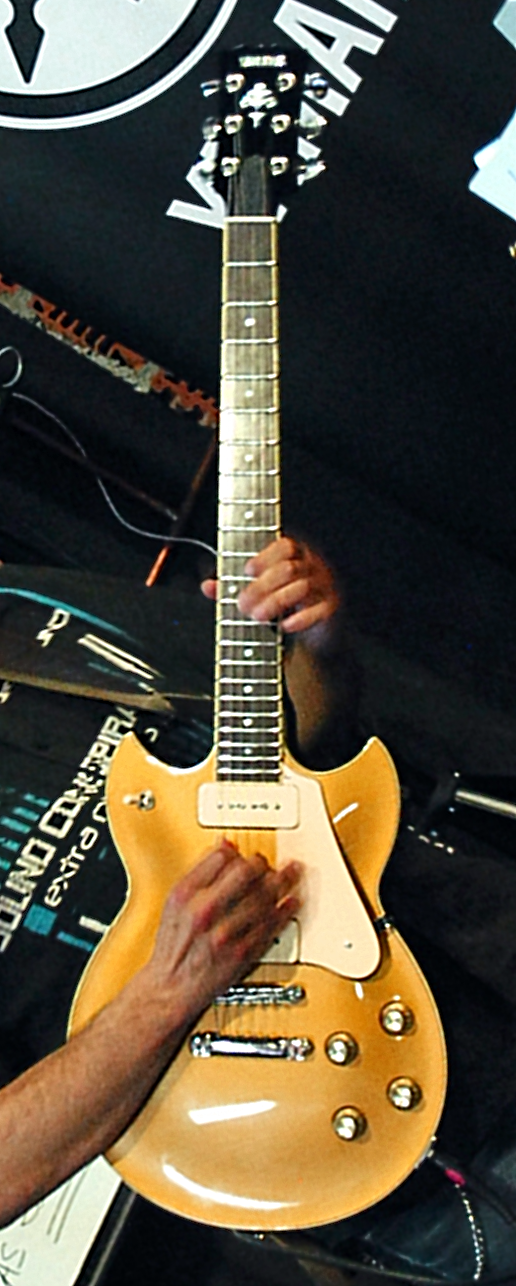
SG1802 (2010)

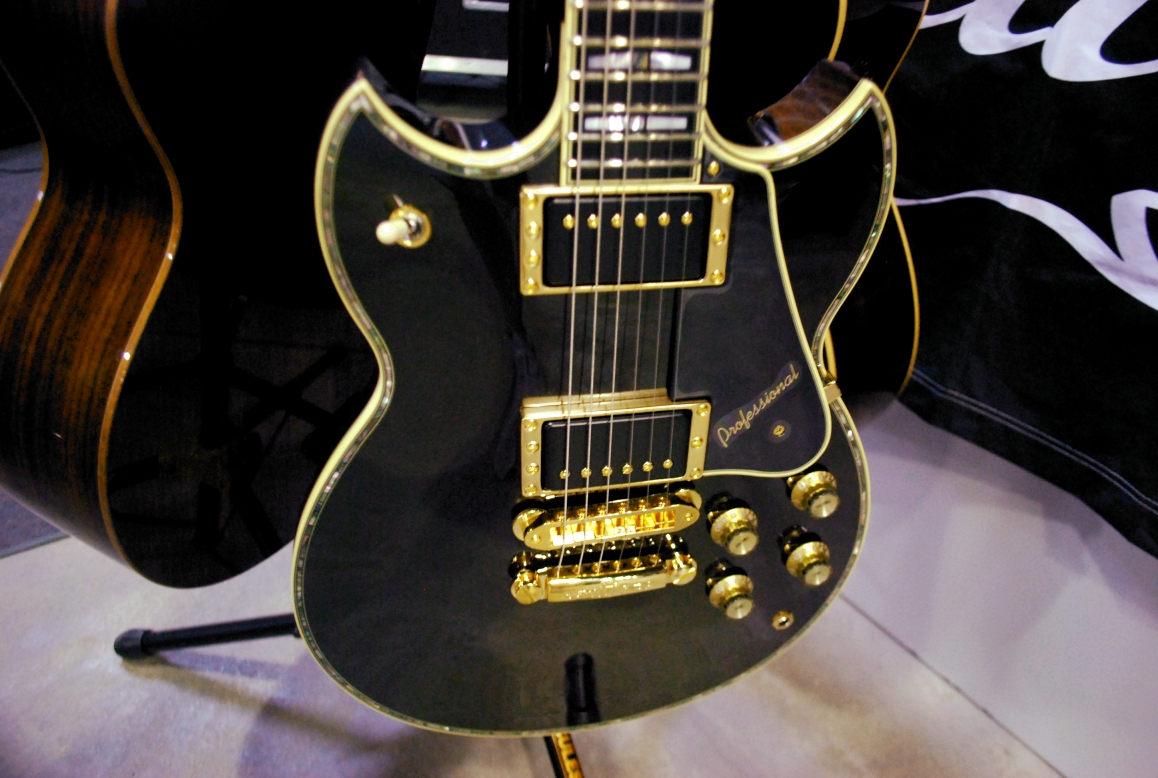
SBG3000

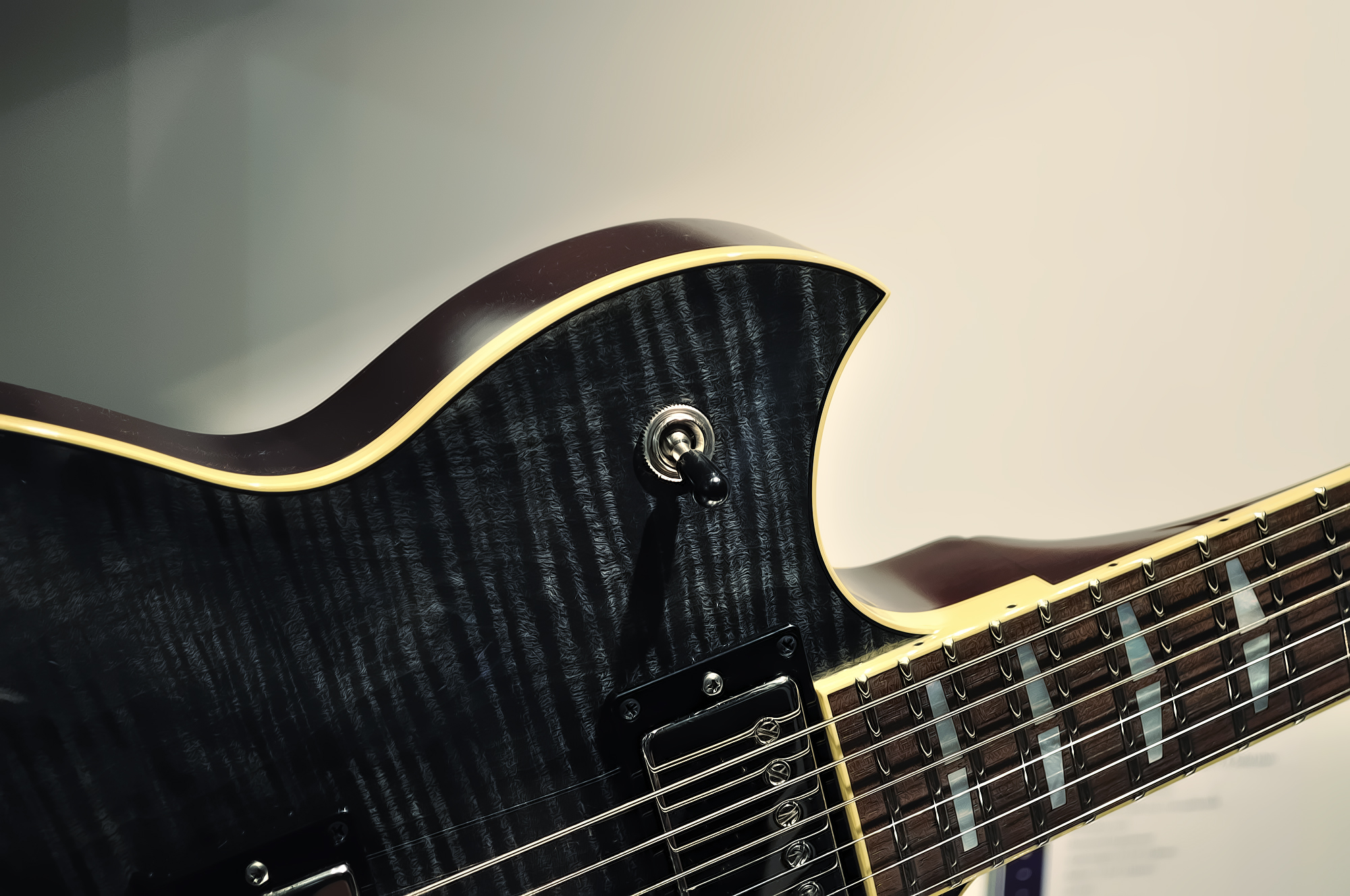
SG1820LTD (2011)

- SG-175 (1974, 1st model with current SG style)
- SG-175B (1996, Yamaha Electric Guitars 30th Anniversary, with Buddha inlay replicated from Carlos Santana model)
- SG-25S / SG-25T (1991 by Yamaha custom shop, Yamaha Electric Guitars 25th Anniversary, based on SG-3000, S = pearl inlay on the body (hummingbird and floral), T = Takanaka model (tremolo and HSH pickups))
- SG-200 (1978) Yuri Kasparyan
- SG-300
- SG-400 (1976)
- SG-500 / SG-500B (July 1976/?)
- SG-510 (1983)
- SG-600 (1979)
- SG-700 (July 1976)
- SG-710T (1984, tremolo)
- SG-800 (1977)
- SG-800S / SBG-500 (1981/1981 (or 1982), limited 6 colors)
- SG1000 / SG-1000L / SBG-1000 (July 1976–1984/1977/1976–1983 in the US, set-in neck, L = left hand)
- SG-1000N / SG1000-24 (1983, 24 = 24frets)
- SG-1000NW (1984)
- SG-1000S (1976)
- SG-1000X (1981)
- SG-1000XU
- SG-1000XY (1985)
- SG-1300 / SG-1300-24 / SG-1300T (1983, 24 = 24frets, T = tremolo)
- SG-1300TS (1984, tremolo)
- SG-1500 (July 1976–1978(or 1979) in the US, basically same as SG-2000, with dot inlay and chrome hardware)
- SG-1500 (1981 in Japan, different new model)
- SG-1600 (1983)
- SG1802 (2010, Seymour Duncan P-90-3 pickups)
- SG1820 / SG1820A (2010, A = EMG85/81 pickups)
- SG-1966 (1985, Yamaha Shibuya Store 20th Anniversary)
- SG-1996
- SG2000 / SBG-2000 / SG-2000S (July 1976–1988/1980s in US/1980s in UK, carved 3 piece maple top/contoured back, 3 piece neck-through (mahogany/maple/mahogany), brass block under the bridge (for sustain))
- SG2000 Devadip (1976, Devadip Carlos Santana model, with Tennyo inlay, dark green)
- SG-2000MT Masayoshi Takanaka model (1998)
- SG2004 (2003)
- SG2100 / SBG-2100 / SG2100S (1983/1984 in the US/UK)
- SG-2500 (1983 in Japan)
- SG3000 / SBG-3000 (1982/1982 in the US, neck-through)
- SG3000 Custom / SBG-3000 Custom (1982/1982 in the US or c. 1985, neck-through, Mexican abalone purfling to the top)

===== Custom Shop SG =====
- SG-I Issei Noro signature (rounded horns)
- SG-T / SG-T2 Masayoshi Takanaka model (1988 (or 1989)/1998, based on SG-3000, with alphabet graphics, tremolo and HSH pickups)
- SG-RR Custom (1989)
- SG-RR Standard (1989, P-90 type pickups, similar to Les Paul Junior DC / Les Paul Special DC)
- SG-RR Junior (1990, P-90 type pickups & Bolt-on neck)
- MSG (1989, rounded horns)
- TSG (1985, Yamaha Electric Guitars 20th Anniversary, asymmetrical rounded horns)
- YSG (1989, asymmetrical double cutaway)

===== SBG series =====
renamed SG in the US, 1980s / renewaled SG in Japan, 1998 / reissued SG in the US, ca.2009

- SBG500(1981 (or 1982)-1983 in the US, export version of SG-800S)
- SBG500B
- SBG700 (1978 or 1979 in the US, renamed version of SG-700)
- SBG700S (1999)
- SBG800S (1998)
- SBG1000 (1980s-1983 in the US/1998/c. 2009 30th anniversary handcraft model, renamed version of SG-1000)
- SBG1200 (1998)
- SBG1996
- SBG2000 (1980s-1984/1998/c. 2009, renamed version of SG-2000, later reissued as 30th anniversary handcraft model)
- SBG2100 (1984 or 1985, successor of SBG2000 in the US)
- SBG3000 (1982/1998/2009, later reissued as 40th anniversary of Yamaha distribution in the U.S., Limited handcraft edition, only 40 pieces made)

===== SJ series =====
similar to Telecaster

- SJ-500 (1978)
- SJ-800 (1978)

===== SX series =====
yet another symmetrical double cutaway model

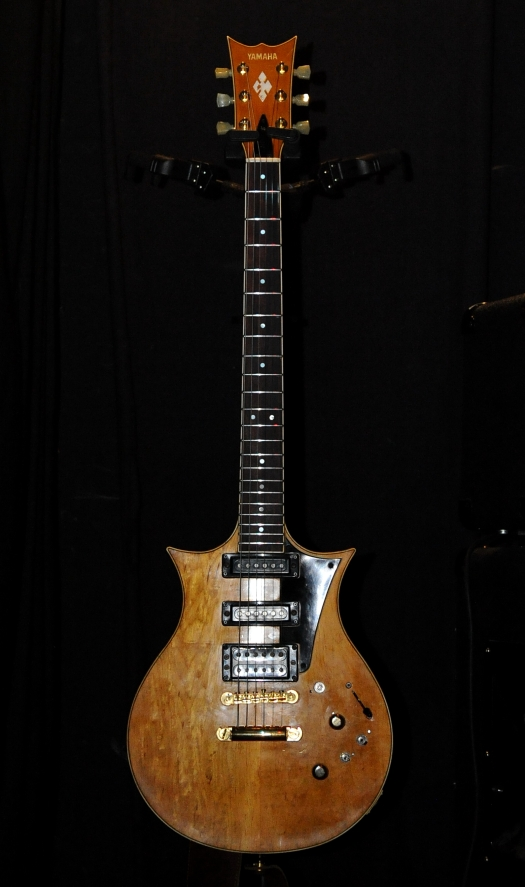
SX-900B (mod to SSH)

- SX-60
- SX-80
- SX-125
- SX-800A
- SX-800B
- SX-900A
- SX-900B

===== VX series =====
Flying V shape

YG series

Super Strat type

- YG521
- YG521MR
- YG612
- YG612FP
- YG621
- YG621MR
- YG820DR
- YG821D
- YG821DMR
- YG1212
- YG1221MR

==== Bass guitars ====
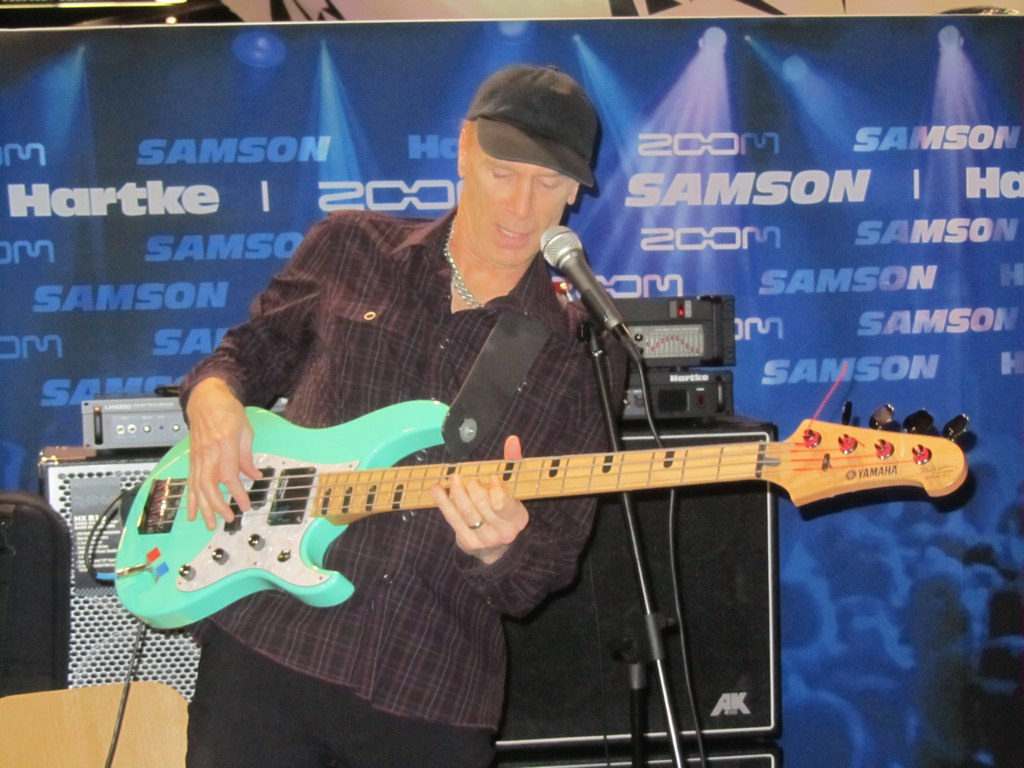
Billy Sheehan, playing his signature ATTITUDE Limited II bass.

- ATTITUDE Limited II Billy Sheehan signature

BB bass

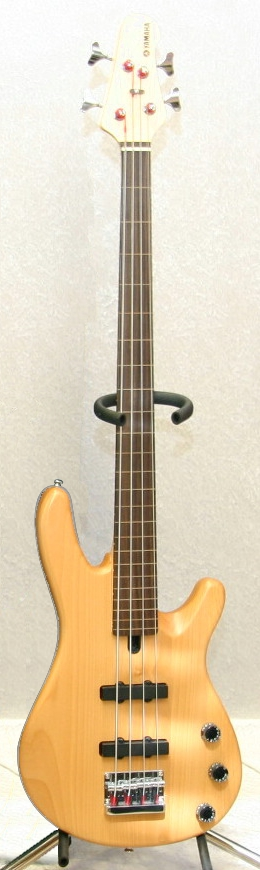
BB404F

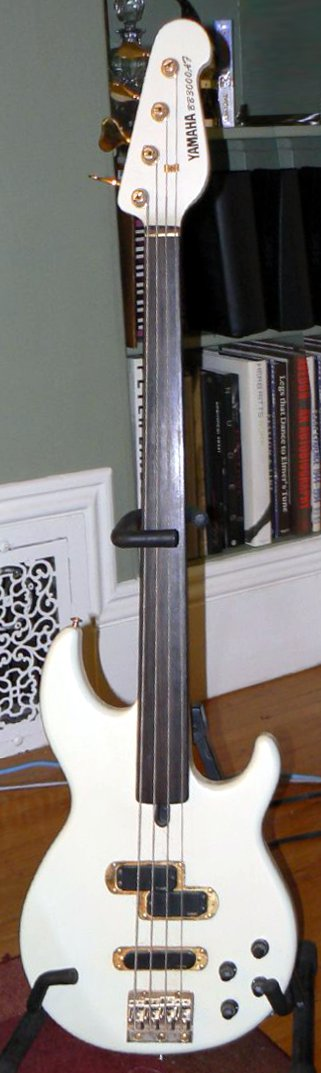
BB3000AF

(S = short scale ?, L = ?, F = fretless, X = with pickguard)
†: discontinued

- BB-424 / BB-424X (2010/2011)
- BB-425 / BB-425X (2010/2011) 5-string version of 424
- BB-714BS (2008) Billy Sheehan signature
- BB-1024 / BB-1024X (2010/2011)
- BB-1025 / BB-1025X (2010/2011) 5-string version of 1024, based on BB-2000
- BB-2024 / BB-2024X (2009/?)
- BB-2025 / BB-2025X (2010/?) 5-string version of 2024
- BB-NE2 Nathan East signature
- BB-P34 / BB-P35

archived

- BB-201
- BB-350[F] / BB-350L^{†}
- BB-400 Series^{†} passive electronics series
- BB-404[F] (2002)^{†}
- BB-405 (2002)^{†} Nathan East style 5-string
- BB-414 / BB-414X (2005)^{†}
- BB-415 (c. 2005 ?)^{†} 5-string
- BB-550
- BB-600 Series^{†} active electronics series
- BB-604 (2002)^{†} Nathan East style 4-string, with NE1 parametric EQ and BB-NE2 silhouette
- BB-605 (2002)^{†} Nathan East style 5-string, with NE1 parametric EQ and BB-NE2 silhouette
- BB-614 (2005)^{†} 4-string
- BB-615 (2005)^{†} 5-string
- BB-650
- BB-800
- BB-850
- BB-1000
- BB1000MA (2002)^{†} Michael Anthony style
- BB-1200
- BB-1500A^{†} vintage-style
- BB-1600
- BB-2000
- BB-2000F / BB-2000S
- BB-2004 (2002)^{†} Nathan East style 4-string
- BB-2004 / BB-2004 Black/Natural Satin/White^{†} 4-string based on BB-NE2
- BB-2005 (2002)^{†} Nathan East style 5-string
- BB-2005 / BB-2005 Black/Natural Satin/White^{†} 5-string based on BB-NE2
- BB-2024SK (2012) Seiji Kameda signature
- BB-3000 / BB-3000S (1982)^{†}
- BB-3000MA^{†} Michael Anthony signature
- BB-5000

archived artist models

- BB-EAST^{†} Nathan East signature 5-string
- BB-G4 / BB-G4S / BB-G4A^{†} 4-string
- BB-G5 / BB-G5S / BB-G5A^{†} 5-string version of BB-G4
- BB-N4[F]^{†}
- BB-N5 / BB-N5A^{†}
- BB-NE / BB-NES Nathan East signature
- BB-VI / BB-VIS
- BB-VII

BEX bass

- BEX-BS Billy Sheehan signature (2002, single cataway semi-acoustic bass, with Art Deco f-hole)

BX bass
headless basses

- BX-1 (1985)
- BX-5

ERB bass

- ERB 070 BP
- ERB 300 2

EBX bass
bass guitars with Explorer shape

- EBX-1 (1985)

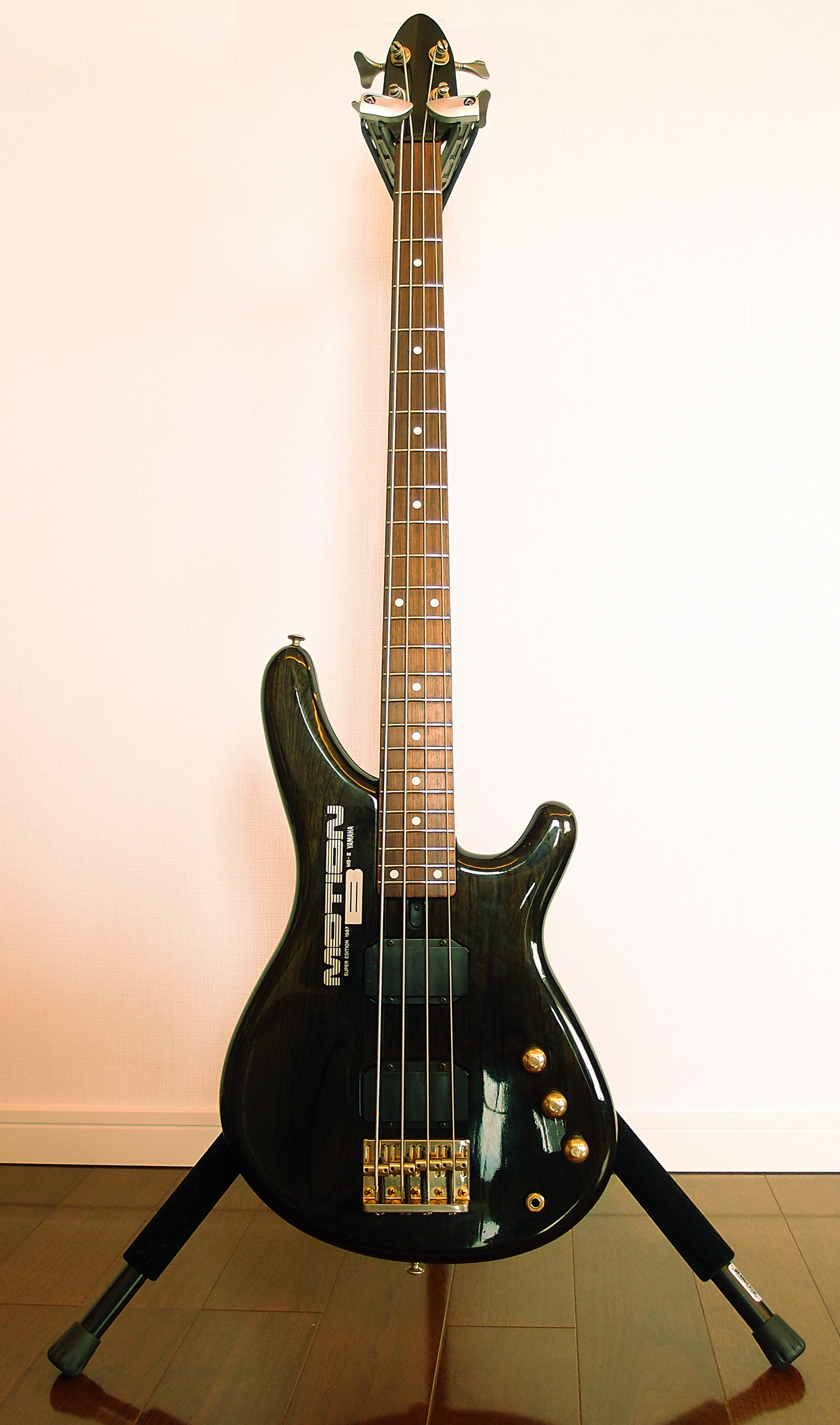
Motion Bass MBIII

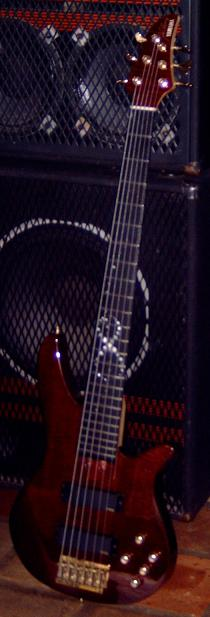
RBX-6JM John Myung signature

Motion bass

- MB-I (1985)
- MB-II (1985)
- MB-III (1985)

RBX bass

- RBX-A2
- RBX-JM2
- RBX-4A2M
- RBX-5
- RBX-5F
- RBX-5A2
- RBX-40
- RBX-6JM / RBX-6JM2 John Myung signature
- RBX-170
- RBX-200
- RBX-250
- RBX-250F
- RBX-260
- RBX-270
- RBX-300
- RBX-350
- RBX-350II
- RBX-370-A
- RBX-374
- RBX-375
- RBX-460
- RBX-550
- RBX-550M
- RBX-750A
- RBX-755A
- RBX-765A
- RBX-600
- RBX-600M
- RBX-800
- RBX-800AF
- RBX-1000

SA bass
bass version of vintage SA series, double cutaway semi-acoustic

- SA-17 (1967)
- SA-70 / SA-70B (1968, B = pearl color)
- SA-75 (1973)

SB bass

- SB-1C
- SB-2
- SB-2A
- SB-5A
- SB-7A
- SB-30
- SB-50
- SB-55
- SB-70
- SB-75
- SB-500
- SB-500S
- SB-600
- SB-700
- SB-800
- SB-800S
- SB-1200S

SBV bass
bass version of BJ-Pro/SG-7AS reissues

- SBV-J1 / SBV-J2 (2004, Hajime Okano produced, J1 = J type pickups / J2 = P type pickups)

TRB bass

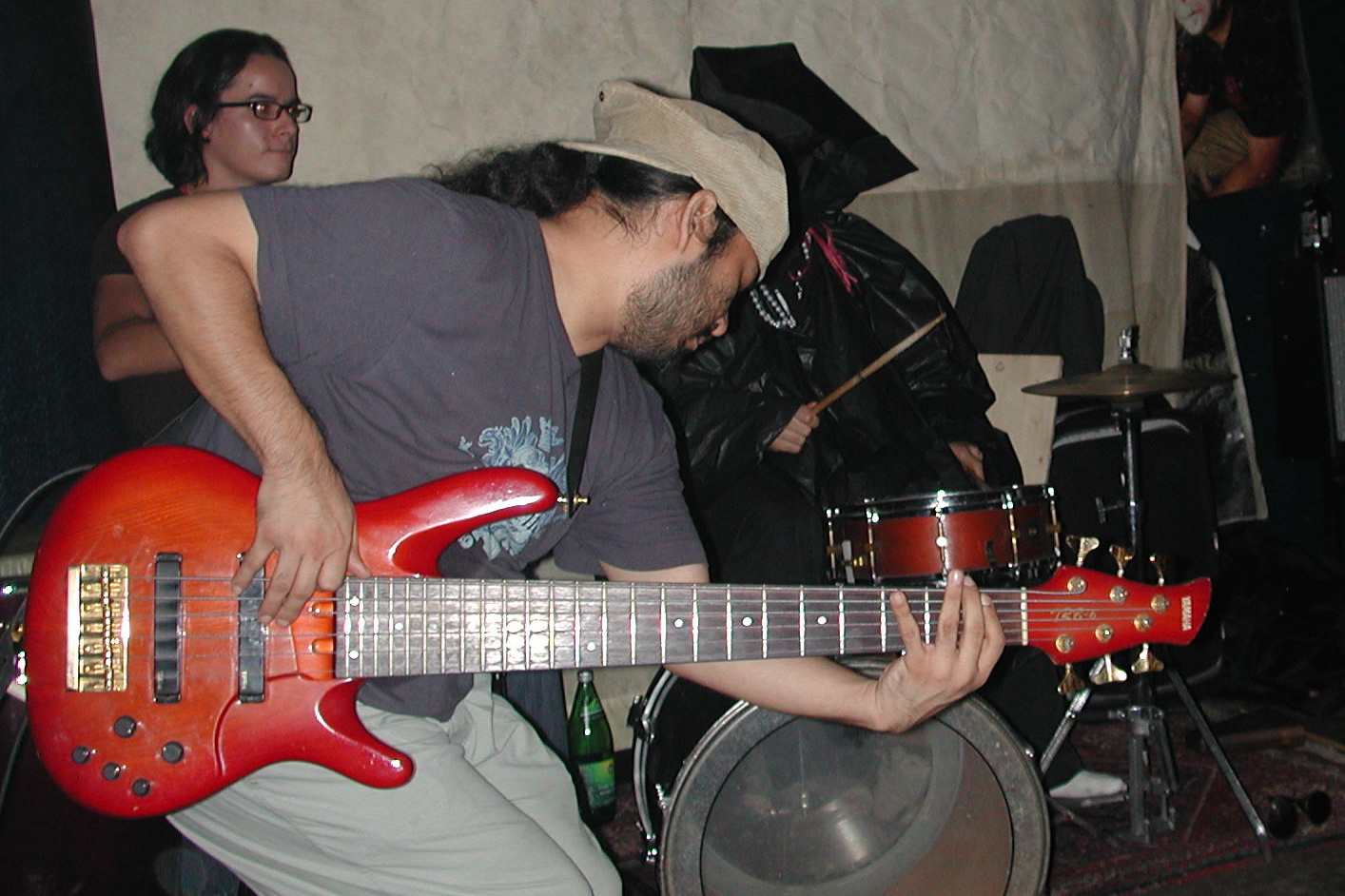
TRB-6

- TRB-1004
- TRB-1005 / TRB-1005F
- TRB-1006
- TRB4
- TRB5
- TRB6
- TRB4II
- TRB5II
- TRB6II
- TRB-5P
- TRB-6P
- TRB-5PII
- TRB-6PII
- TRB-6JP / TRB-6JP2 John Patitucci signature

==== Guitar effects ====
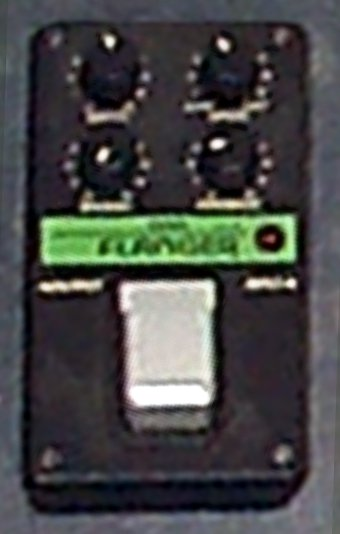
01 series
FL-01 Flanger

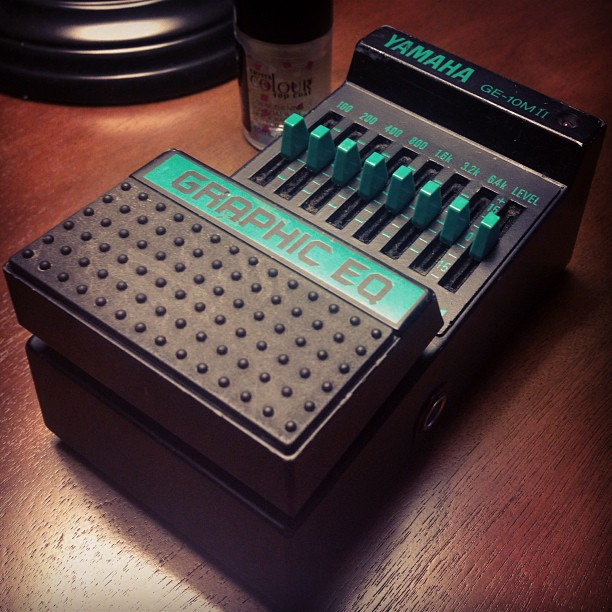
10M II series
GE-10M II Graphic EQ

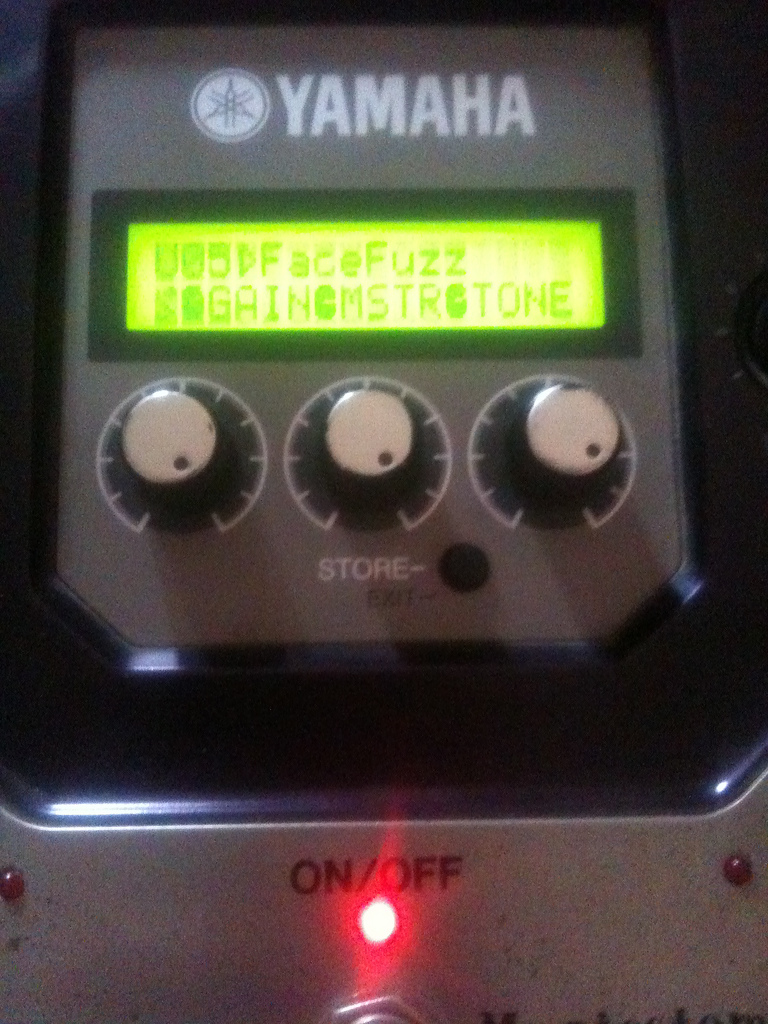
Magicstomp (detail)

- Magicstomp Model UB99

01 series Professional System Effectors (1980)

- AD-10 Analog Delay
- CH-01 Chorus
- CO-01 Compressor
- DS-01 Distortion
- FL-01 Flanger
- LI-01 Limiter
- LS-01 Line Selector
- MP-01 Mini Pedal (with CV output)
- NG-01 Noise Gate
- OC-01 Octaver
- PE-01 Parametric EQ
- PH-01 Phaser
- TB-01 Tone Booster
- SB-100 Professional System Board
- SB-200 Professional System Board (with patch panel)

10M series

- OD-10M Over Drive

10M II series

- CO-10MII Compressor
- GE-10M II Graphic EQ

20M series

- DDS-20M Delay Pedal
- DSC-20M Stereo Chorus Pedal
- MDB-20M Multi-band Distortion Pedal

100 series (c. 1988)

- BD-100 Beat Drive
- CO-100 Compressor
- COD-100 C MOS Over Drive
- CS-100 Compressor Sustainer
- DD-100 Digital Delay
- DI-100 Distortion
- FL-100 Flanger
- GE-100 Graphic Equalizer for Guitar
- NR-100 Noise Reducer
- PH-100 Phase Shifter
- AC-320 Power Supply

x01 series Professional System Effectors

- PSE40A system board
- COY-101 Compressor
- ODY-101 Over Drive
- GEY-201 Graphic EQ
- ADY-301 Analog Delay
- CHY-301 Chorus
- FLY-401 Flanger
- PHY-401 Phaser
- VP-500 volume pedal

==== Guitar amplifiers ====
- HY-10G / HY-10GIII (40 W?)
- Park G10 (combo, designed by Marshall)
- T50 / T50C (c. 2009, 50 W tube head/combo, designed by Soldano (SLO))
- T100 / T100C (c. 2009, 100 W tube head/combo, designed by Soldano (SLO))

A line

- AA5 (battery amp, 5 W, for silent guitar)
- BA-15 (bass amp)
- GA-10 (7 W 12 cm)
- GA-15
- VA-5 "Power Boy" (5 W 12 cm)
- VA-7W
- VA-10 (twin 3 W+3 W 2×12 cm))

R line

- AR-1500 (15 W 8-inch introduced 1990)
- AR-1500 Live / AR-1500R (15 W 8-inch, R = reverb. introduced 1992)
- AR-1500B (15 W 10-inch bass amp introduced 1990)
- AR-2500 (25 W 10-inch introduced 1990)
- AR-2500B (25 W 12-inch bass amp introduced 1990)
- AR-PRO (30 W 10-inch combo)
- HR-1000
- HR-1000B (bass amp)
- HR-1500 (c. 1987, 25 W?)
- HR-1500B (bass amp)
- HR-2000
- HR-2000B (bass amp)
- HR-3000B (bass amp)
- SR50-112 (50 W 12-inch introduced 1994)
- SR100-112 (100 W 12-inch introduced 1994)
- SR100-212 (100 W 2×12-inch introduced 1994)
- SR300G (300 W 4ohm head)
- SR412 (4×12-inch cabinet)
- SR400B (400 W bass head)
- SR215B (2×15-inch bass cabinet)
- SR80B-115 (80 W 15-inch bass amp)
- SR160B-115 (160 W 15-inch bass amp)
- VR4000 (stereo 50 W 2×10-inch)
- VR6000 (stereo 100 W 2×12-inch)

DG series
digital modeling amplifier

- DG60-112 / DG60FX-112 / DS60-112 (12-inch, combo / combo with effects / powered cabinet)
- DG80-112A
- DG85
- DG100-212 / DG100-212A (2×12-inch, A = with built-in effects (chorus, tremolo, tape echo))
- DG-1000 (preamp, flagship of DG amp series & DG-STOMP series)
- DS60-112 (12-inch, combo / powered cabinet; similar power circuitry and same Celestion speaker as the DG60-112, but not digital; three band High Mid base EQ, no effects)

F series (Introduced 1980)

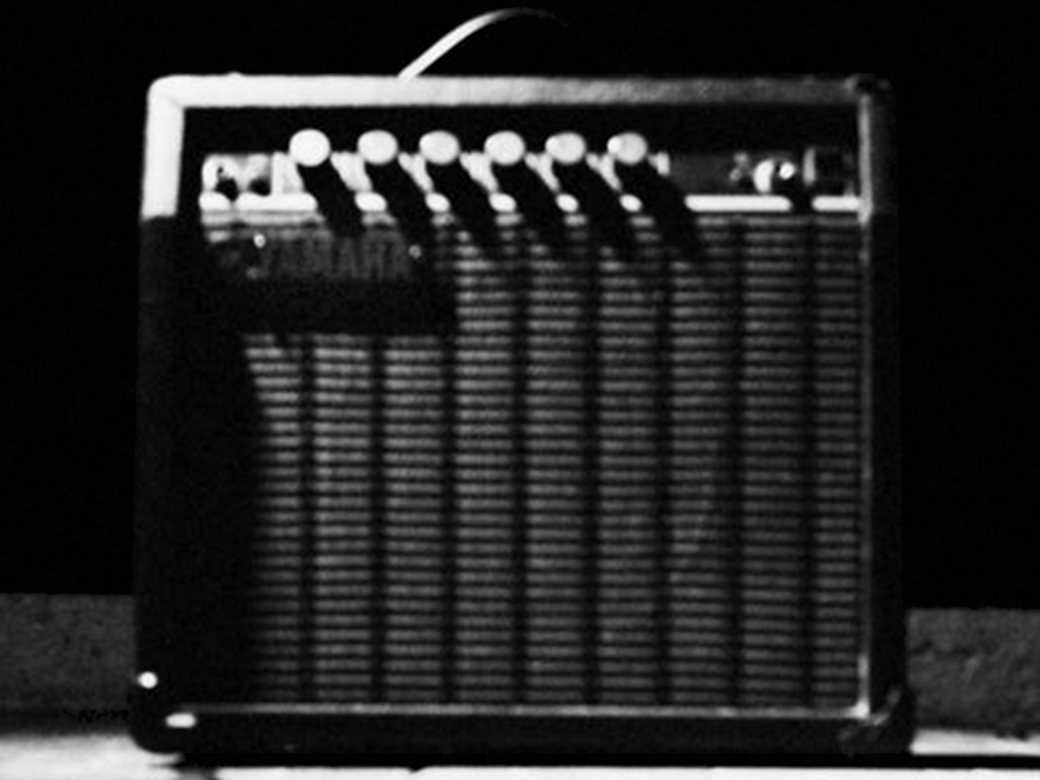
F-20

- F-20 (20 W 8-inch introduced 2001)
- F-20FX (FX = stereo effects)
- F-20B (20 W 10-inch bass amp introduced 2001)
- F30R (30 W 10-inch, R = reverb.)
- F50-112 (50 W 12-inch, color:black, gray 1980)
- F50-115B (50 W bass amp, 50 W 15-inch 1980)
- F100-112 (100 W 12-inch, color:black, gray 1980)
- F100-115 (100 W 15-inch 1980)
- F100-115B (100 W bass amp 15-inch 1980)
- F100-212 (100 W 2×12-inch 1980)

G series (1980s)

Series I Series II 1982 Series III 1985

- G-5 (7 W 6-inch introduced 1982)
- G-10L (7 W 6-inch introduced 1979)
- G-10W (7 W 6-inch introduced 1979)
- G50-112 (50 W, 12-inch)
- G50-410 (50 W, 4×10-inch)
- G100 (100 W head, successor to the J-100)
- G100-112 (100 W, 12-inch)
- G100-115 (100 W, 15-inch)
- G100-210 (100 W, 2×10-inch)
- G100-212 (100 W, 2×12-inch)
- S412 (4×12-inch cabinet to match G100)

J series (1970s, the combos were replaced by the JX and F series in 1980, the separate heads and cabinets continued into the 1980s)

- J-15 (15 W 12-inch introduced 1979)
- J-25 (30 W 12-inch)
- J-35 (40 W 12-inch)
- J-35B (30 W bass amp 15-inch introduced 1979)
- J-45II (50 W 12-inch)
- J-45B (50 W bass amp 15-inch)
- J-55 (50 W 12-inch)
- J-55B (50 W bass amp 15-inch)
- J-65 (50 W 2×12-inch)
- J-75 (50 W 4×10-inch)
- J-85 (100 W 2×12-inch)
- J-95 (twin)
- J-100 (100 W head)
- J-100B (100 W bass head)
- J-100S (2×12-inch cabinet)
- J-105 (100 W 2 Channel amp 2×12-inch)
- J-110S (15-inch cabinet)
- J-110L (15-inch bass cabinet
- J-115 (100 W 15-inch)
- J-115B (100 W bass amp 15-inch)
- S-115 (bass cabinet for J-115B, 120 W 15-inch)
- J-120L (2×15-inch bass cabinet)
- J-125 (100 W 2 Channel 15-inch)
- J-135 (100 W 4×10-inch)
- J-140S (4×12-inch cabinet)
- J-145 (100 W 4×12-inch)
- J-160S (6×10-inch cabinet)

JX series (1980s)

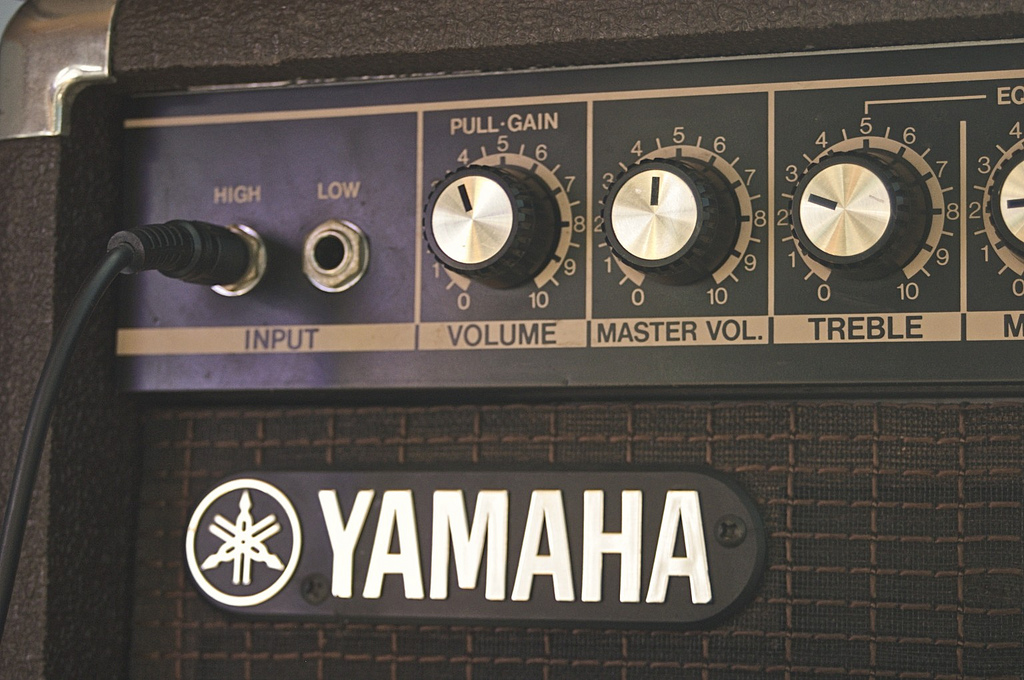
JX55 (input)

- JX15
- JX20 (20 W 10-inch 1980)
- JX25 / JX25B
- JX30 (30 W 12-inch 1980)
- JX30B (30 W bass amp 15-inch 1980)
- JX35B (JX30B with comp)
- JX40 (30 W 12-inch 1980)
- JX50 (50 W 1980)
- JX50B (50 W bass amp 1980)
- JX55 / JX55B
- JX65D (c. 1982, 2×12-inch)

RA rotary speakers (1970s)
rotary sound amplifiers which produce Leslie speaker effects by rotating a series of speaker units instead of horns. also featuring Yamaha Natural Sound Speaker units

- CSY-2 (1975)
- R-60 (a combination of dual 3way normal speakers and dual 2way rotary speakers)
- RA-50 (1970s, single rotary + woofer)
- RA-70R
- RA-100 (1970s, dual rotary + woofer)
- RA-200R (1970s, triple rotary + woofer) — David Gilmour (Pink Floyd) used it along with Hiwatt amp between 1976 and 1983.

TA series (late 1960s)
wedge-shaped flat amplifiers, featuring Yamaha Natural Sound Speaker units

- TA-20
- TA-30 (c. 1968, 30 W RMS/ 50 W music power)
- TA-60 (c. 1968, 60 W RMS/100 W music power)
- TA-90 (PE100 head + TS90 cabinet, 90 W RMS)

VR series (1989–1991)

- VR-3000 (50 W @ 8Ω, 1x12" speaker, dual channel, 1 parametric EQ per channel, reverb)
- VR-4000 (stereo 2×25 W @ 8Ω, 2x10" speakers, dual channel, 1 parametric EQ per channel, reverb, chorus)
- VR-5000 (100 W @ 8Ω, 1x12" speaker, dual channel, 2 parametric EQ per channel, reverb)
- VR-6000 (stereo 2×50 W @ 8Ω, 2x12" speakers, dual channel, 2 parametric EQ per channel, reverb, chorus)
- VR-75B (75 W 15-inch bass amp)
- VR-150B (150 W 15-inch bass amp)

VX series (red logo)

- VX10 (10 W combo)
- VX15 (10 W combo)
- VX25 (20 W combo)
- VX35 (30 W combo)
- VX25B (30 W combo bass amp)
- VX35B (30 W combo bass amp)
- VX55B (50 W combo bass amp)

YTA series (1970s, blue line)

- YTA-15A
- YTA-95 (100 W 2×12-inch)
- YTA-110A

B series bass amps

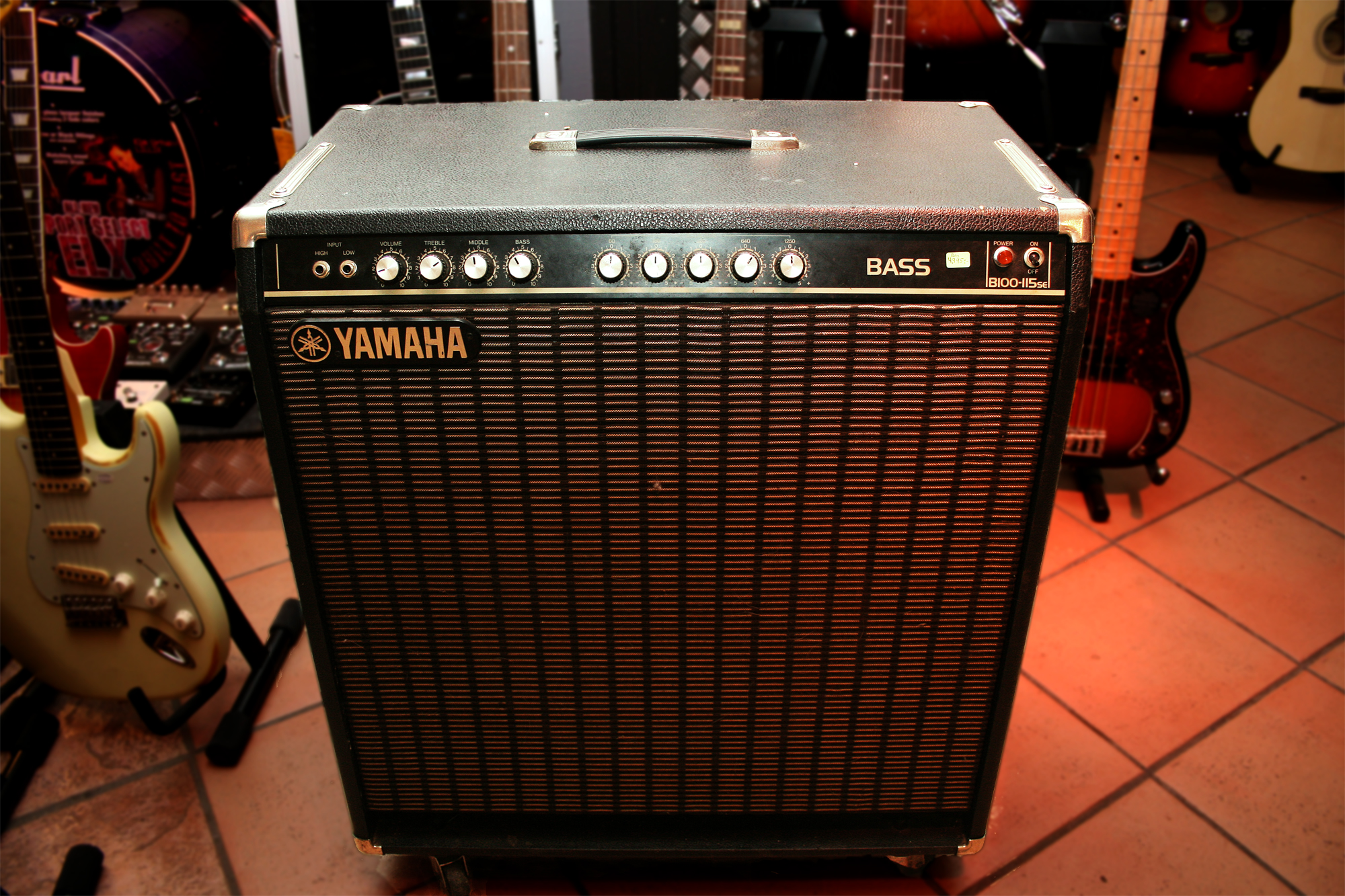
B110-115 SE

Series I Series II 1982 Series III 1985

- B50-115 (50 W bass combo)
- B100 (100 W head, successor to the J-100B)
- B100-115 I/II/III (100 W bass combo, 15-inch)
- B100-115SE (100 W bass combo, 15-inch smaller and lighter than the numbered series, 790mm tall and 44 kg, vs 950mm and 52 kg)
- S115 (15-inch bass cabinet to match B100 head)
- S215 (2×15-inch bass cabinet to match B100 head)

BBT series digital bass amps

- BBT500H (head, 500 W@2Ω)
- BBT210S (cabinet, 2×10-inch)
- BBT410S (cabinet, 4×10-inch)
- BBT500-115 (combo, 500 W 15-inch)

YBA series (1970s, blue line)

- YBA-45

=== Power amplifiers ===
P/PC series power amplifiers

- P2500S
- P2050
- P7000S
- PC-1002

==== Keyboard amplifiers ====
- MS101 / MS101-3 (powered monitor, 10 W 4-inch)
- SKS50

=== Percussion instruments ===
==== Timpani ====
All of the Timpani Models (except 9000) are balanced action.

- TP-3100 (Portable Aluminum Series)
- TP-4200 (Concert Series. Fiberglass)
- TP-6200 (Symphonic Series: Smooth Copper)
- TP-7200 (Hammered Symphonic. 4 mm Suspension Ring for Accurate Tuning)
- TP-9000 (Grand Concert Series: Hammered Copper, Ringer Style. Berlin & Dresden Friction Post, and Berlin Ratchet. Comes with a fine tuner.)

==== Marimbas ====
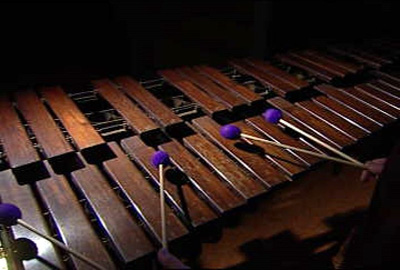

- YM-40 (3 1/2 octave Standard Padauk marimba)
- YM-1430 (4 1/3 octave Standard Padauk Marimba)
- YM-2400 (4 1/3 octave intermediate Acoustalon marimba)
- YMRD-2400 (4 1/3 octave Acoustalon Multi-Frame II marimba)
- YMT-2400 (4 1/3 octave Acoustalon Tough-Terrain Frame marimba)
- YMRD-2900A (4 1/2 octave intermediate Acoustalon Multi-Frame II Marimba)
- YM-4600A (4 1/3 octave Professional rosewood Marimba)
- YM-4900A (4 1/2 octave Professional rosewood Marimba)
- YM-5100A (5 Octave Professional rosewood Marimba)
- YM-5104A (5 1/2 octave Custom rosewood Marimba)
- YM-6100 (5 octave Artist(Keiko Abe) Model rosewood Marimba)

==== Drum kits ====
Yamaha drum kits

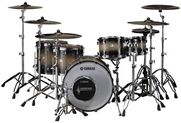
Yamaha PHX

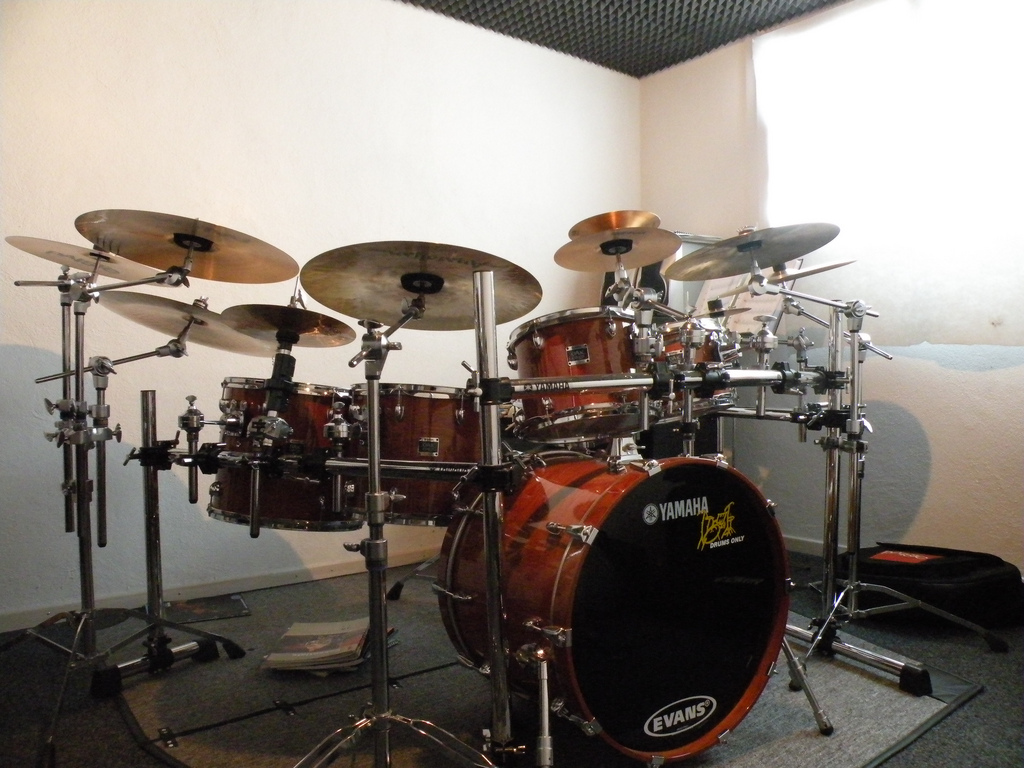
Oak Custom

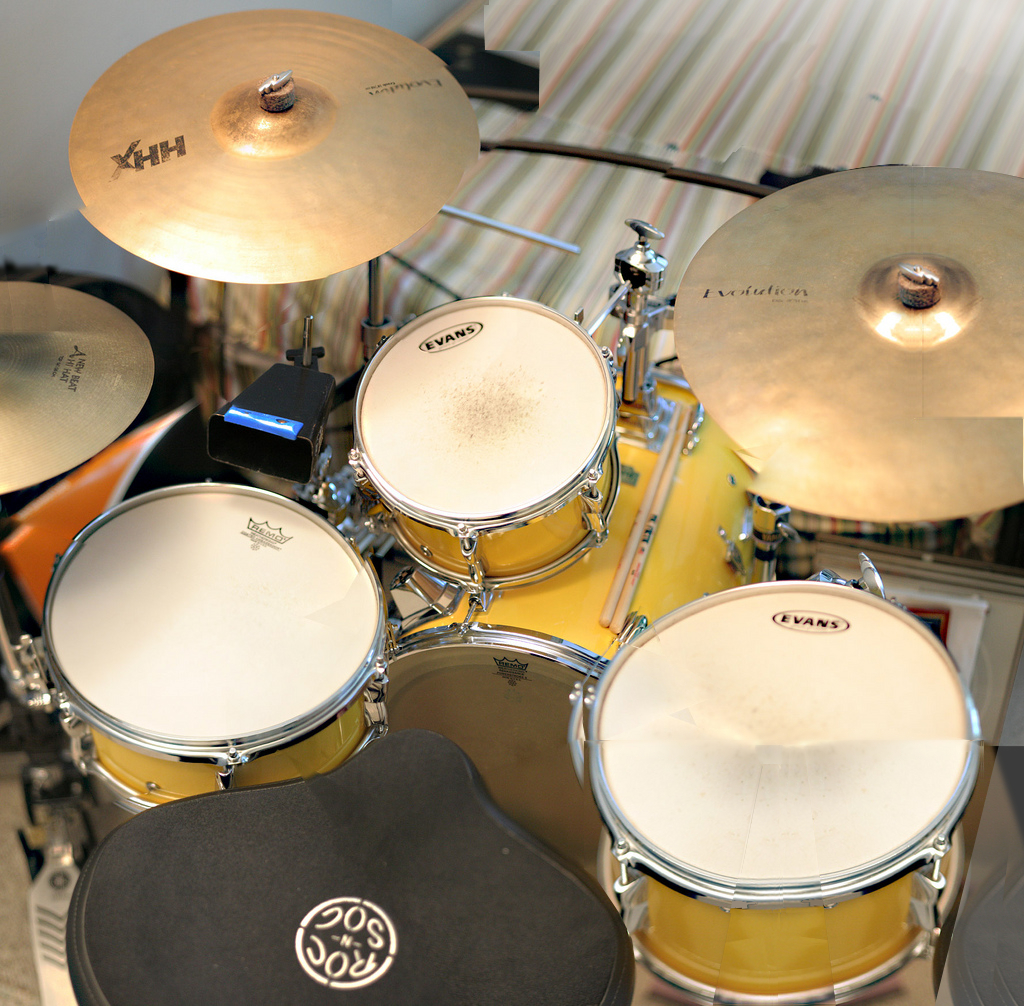
HipGig

===== Acoustic drums =====
- Yamaha PHX
- Yamaha Maple Custom Absolute
- Yamaha Birch Custom Absolute
- Yamaha Recording Custom
- Yamaha Rock Tour Custom
- Yamaha Club Custom
- Yamaha Oak Custom
- Yamaha Beech Custom
- Yamaha Tour Custom
- Yamaha Stage Custom
- Yamaha Rock Tour
- Yamaha GigMaker
- Yamaha HipGig

===== Electronic drums =====
- EPS-1 (1986) PMC1 "Percussion Midi Converter", Pads: PTT1 (toms, snare), and PTB1 (kick). Included DX7 compatible drum Rom cartridge
- EPS-D8 (1986) PTX8 "Percussion Tone Generator", Pads: PTT8 (tom), PSD8 (snare), and PBD8 (kick)
- EP 75 pad (1993)
- KP 75 kick (1993)

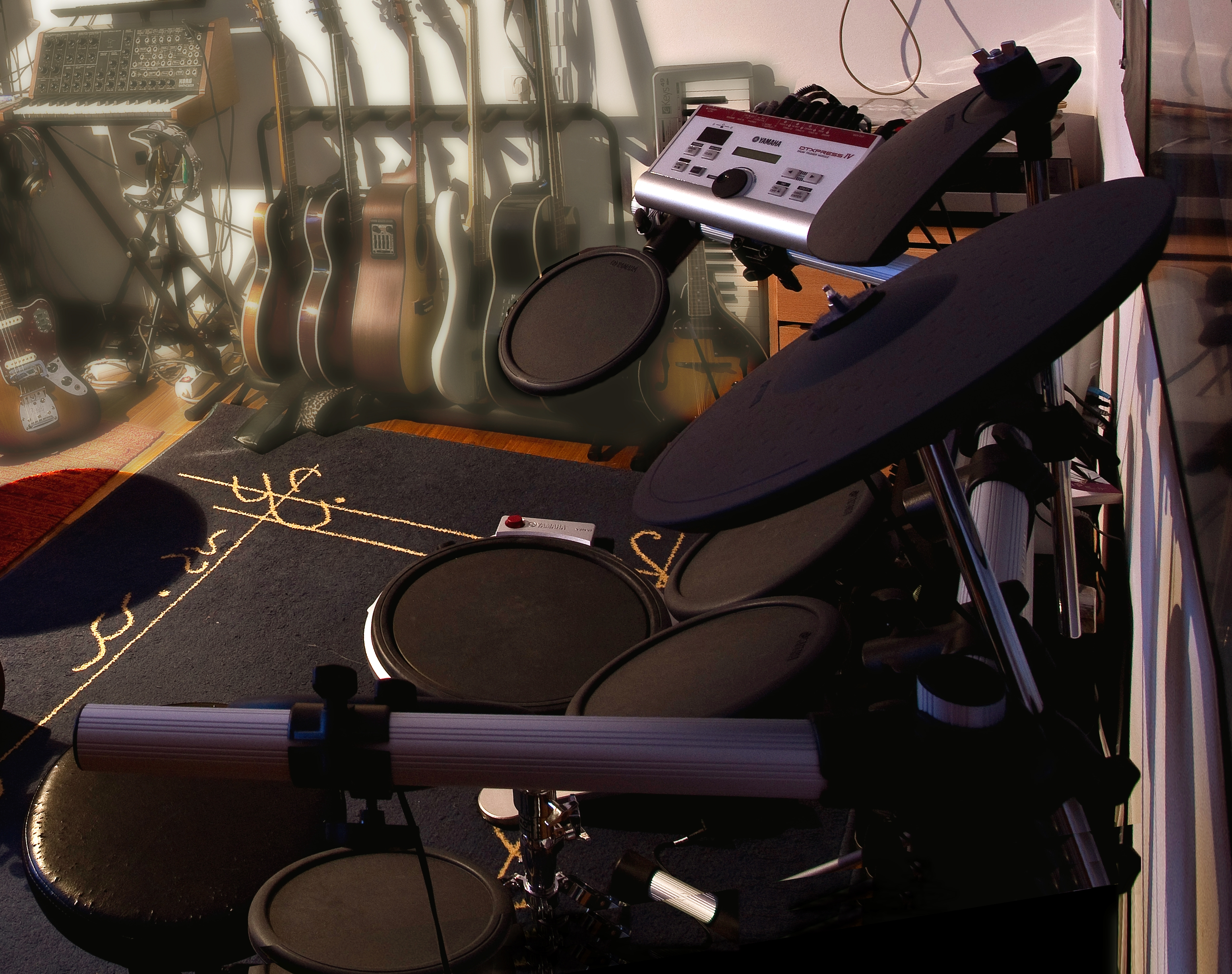
DTXpress IV

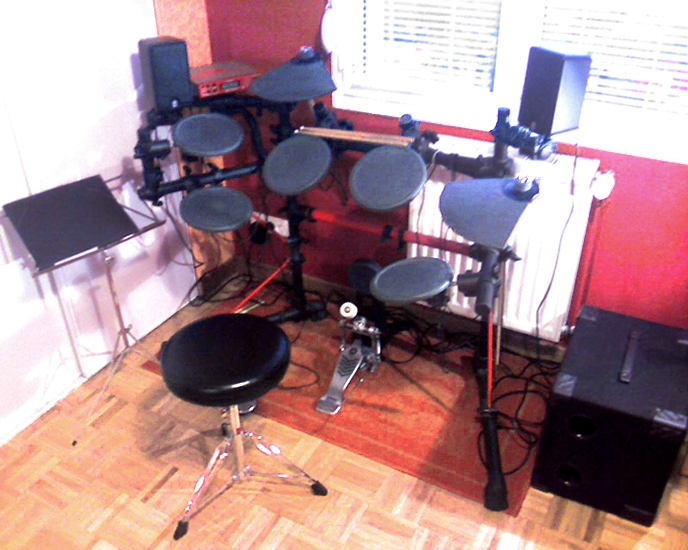
DTXpress II

- DTX (1996)
- DTXpress (1999)
- DTXpress II / DTXtreme II
- DTXpress III / DTXtreme III (/2008)
- DTXpress IV (2006)
- DTXplorer
- DTX-MULTI 12 (2009, drum pad)
- DTX522K / DTX532K / DTX562K (2013)
- DTX500K / DTX900K (2010, DTX-PAD model)
- DTX550K / DTX950K (2011, DTX-PAD model)

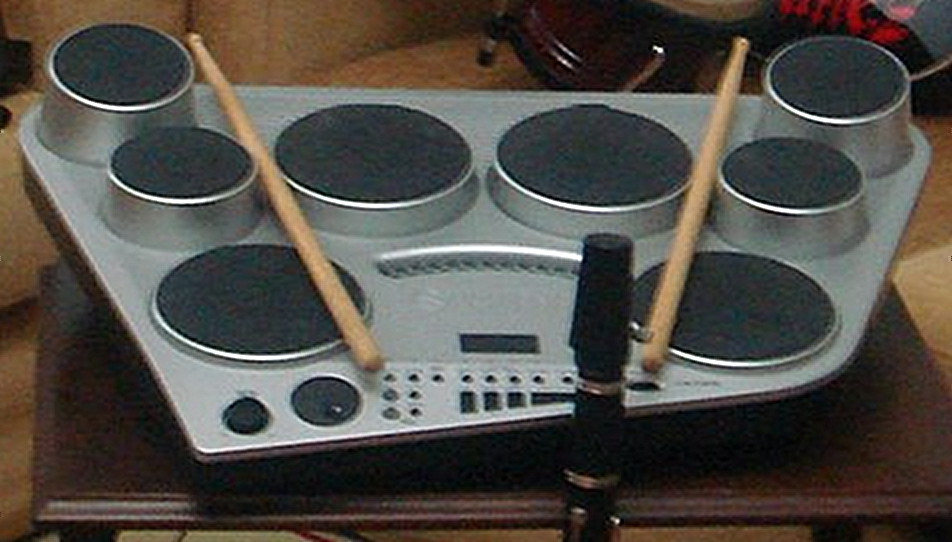
DD-65 Digital Drum Kit (2007)

DD series digital percussion

- DD-3 (1993, 2 pads)
- DD-5 (1988, 4 pads)
- DD-6 / DD-7 (1990/1992, 4 pads)
- DD-10 (1988, 8 mini pads, stereo speaker)
- DD-9/DD-9M (1994, 4 pads)
- DD-11/DD-12/DD-14 (1991/1993, 8 pads)
- DD-20/DD-20S/DD-20C (1995, 4 pads)
- DD-35 (2001, 4 pads)
- DD-45 / YDD-40 (2010 export model)
- DD-50 (1996 export model ?)
- DD-55 / DD-55C (2001/2004, 7 pads)
- DD-65 (2007, 8 pads)
- DD-75 (2016, 8 pads)

=== Brass instruments ===
==== Cornets ====
- YCR-231
- YCR-233
- YCR-2310II
- YCR-2330II
- YCR-2335
- YCR-6330S
- YCR-8335
- YCR-8620S
- YCR-9435

==== Trumpets ====
YTR-8445

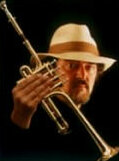
Edward Tarr with high-B-Trumpet Tarr model

- YTR-1310
- YTR-1320se
- YTR-1335
- YTR-232
- YTR-2320
- YTR-2320S
- YTR-2330
- YTR-2335
- YTR-4335G
- YTR-5335GII
- YTR-6335
- YTR-6345G
- YTR-6345HG II
- YTR-6310Z
- YTR-8310Z
- YTR-8335
- YTR-8335RGS
- YTR-8345
- YTR-9335CHS/NYS
- YTR-9445CHS/NYS
- YTR-9636
- YTR-9835
- YTR-988

==== Trombones ====
YSL denotes any Alto, Tenor, Compact or Valve trombone
YBL denotes any Bass trombone
Dis. = Discontinued Models

Student Range

- YSL-154
- YSL-352 (Dis.)
- YBL-322 (Dis.)
- YSL-354
- YSL-354G

Compact Trombones

- YSL-350C

Valve Trombones

- YSL-354V

Intermediate Trombones

- YSL-445G
- YSL-446G
- YSL-447G
- YSL-448G
- YBL-421G

Professional Trombones

- YSL-610
- YSL-620
- YSL-630
- YSL-640
- YBL-620G

Custom Jazz Trombones

- YSL-691Z (Dis.)
- YSL-697Z (Dis.)
- YSL-891Z
- YSL-897Z

Xeno Trombones

- YSL-881
- YSL-881G
- YSL-882
- YSL-882G
- YSL-882O
- YSL-882GO
- YSL-882OR
- YSL-882GOR
- YBL-822G
- YBL-830

Custom Alto Trombones

- YSL-871
- YSL-872

==== French horns ====
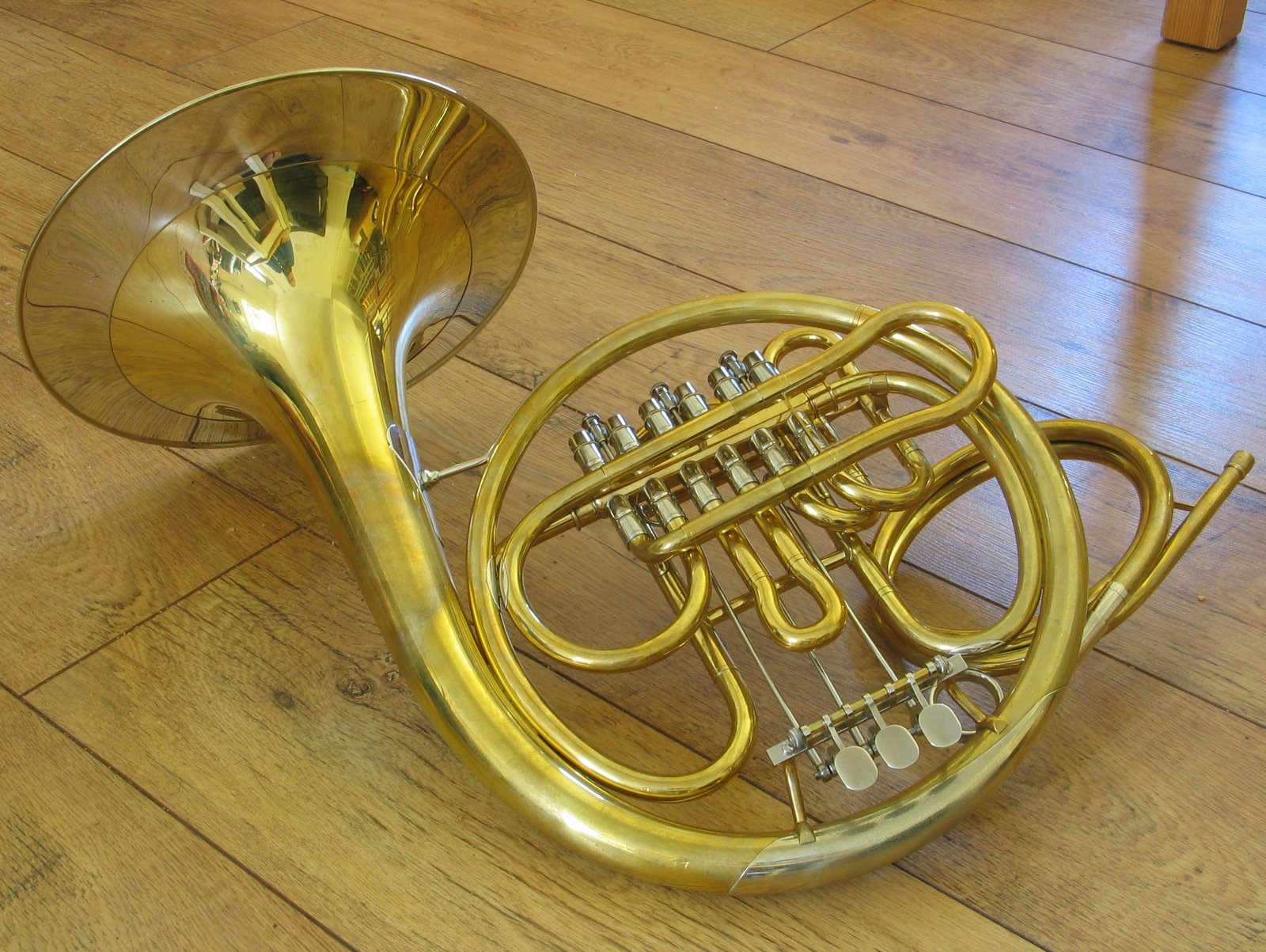
Vienna Horn YHR-601

- YHR-567
- YHR-601
- YHR-667
- YHR-667V
- YHR-668
- YHR-668II
- YHR-671D (detachable)

Mellophones

- YMP-201 (circular, more concert-focused mellophone)
- YMP-202M[S]
- YMP-203M[S]
- YMP-204M[S]

Note: Model 204 is mainly an improved revision of the model 203.

==== Euphoniums ====
- YEP-201[S]
- YEP-321[S]
- YEP-621[S]
- YEP-642[S]
- YEP-842[S]
- YEP-202M[S] (Marching Euphonium)

==== Baritone horns ====
- YBH-301S
- YBH-621S
- YBH-301M[S] (Marching Baritone)

==== Tenor horns ====
- YAH-201
- YAH-202
- YAH-203
- YAH-602

==== Flugelhorns ====
- YFH-231
- YFH-2310
- YFH-631
- YFH-731
- YFH-631G
- YFH-6310Z
- YFH-731 ( Dis.)
- YFH-8310Z
- YFH-8310G

==== Tubas ====
in BBb

- YBB-103 ( Dis. )
- YBB-105
- YBB-201
- YBB-321
- YBB-621
- YBB-631S
- YBB-632
- YBB-623
- YBB-641
- YBB-841
- YBB-105MSWC (3/4 Convertible Tuba)
- YBB-201MSWC (Convertible Tuba)
- YBB-202MWC (Marching Tuba)

in CC

- YCB-621
- YCB-661
- YCB-822
- YCB-826S

in Eb

- YEB-321S
- YEB-632S

in F

- YFB-621
- YFB-821
- YFB-822

==== Sousaphones ====
in BBb

- YSH-301
- YSH-411

=== Woodwind instruments ===
==== Clarinets ====
===== B♭ Clarinets =====
- Advantage
- YCL-20
- YCL-250
- YCL-250S (Silver Plated)
- YCL-251 (Japan import)
- YCL-255
- YCL-26
- YCL-26ii (precursor to YCL-250)
- YCL-34
- YCL-34ii (precursor to YCL-450)
- YCL-34iiS (Silver Plated)
- YCL-450 (Silver Plated)
- YCL-450N (Nickel Plated)
- YCL-550AL
- YCL-62
- YCL-64 (precursor to YCL-650)
- YCL-650
- YCL-SE (custom clarinets starting from this point)
- YCL-CS
- YCL-CX
- YCL-SEV
- YCL-CSV
- YCL-CSG
- YCL-CSG-H
- YCL-CSGII

===== A Clarinets =====
- YCL-CS-A
- YCL-SE-A
- YCL-CSG-A
- YCL-CSG-AH
- YCL-CSV-A
- YCL-SEV-A
- YCL-CSG-AII

===== E♭ Clarinets =====
- YCL-881
- YCL-681II

===== Bass Clarinets =====
- YCL-221II
- YCL-621II
- YCL-622II

===== Alto Clarinets =====
- YCL-631II

==== Bassoons ====
- YFG-811
- YFG-812
- YFG-821

==== Flutes ====
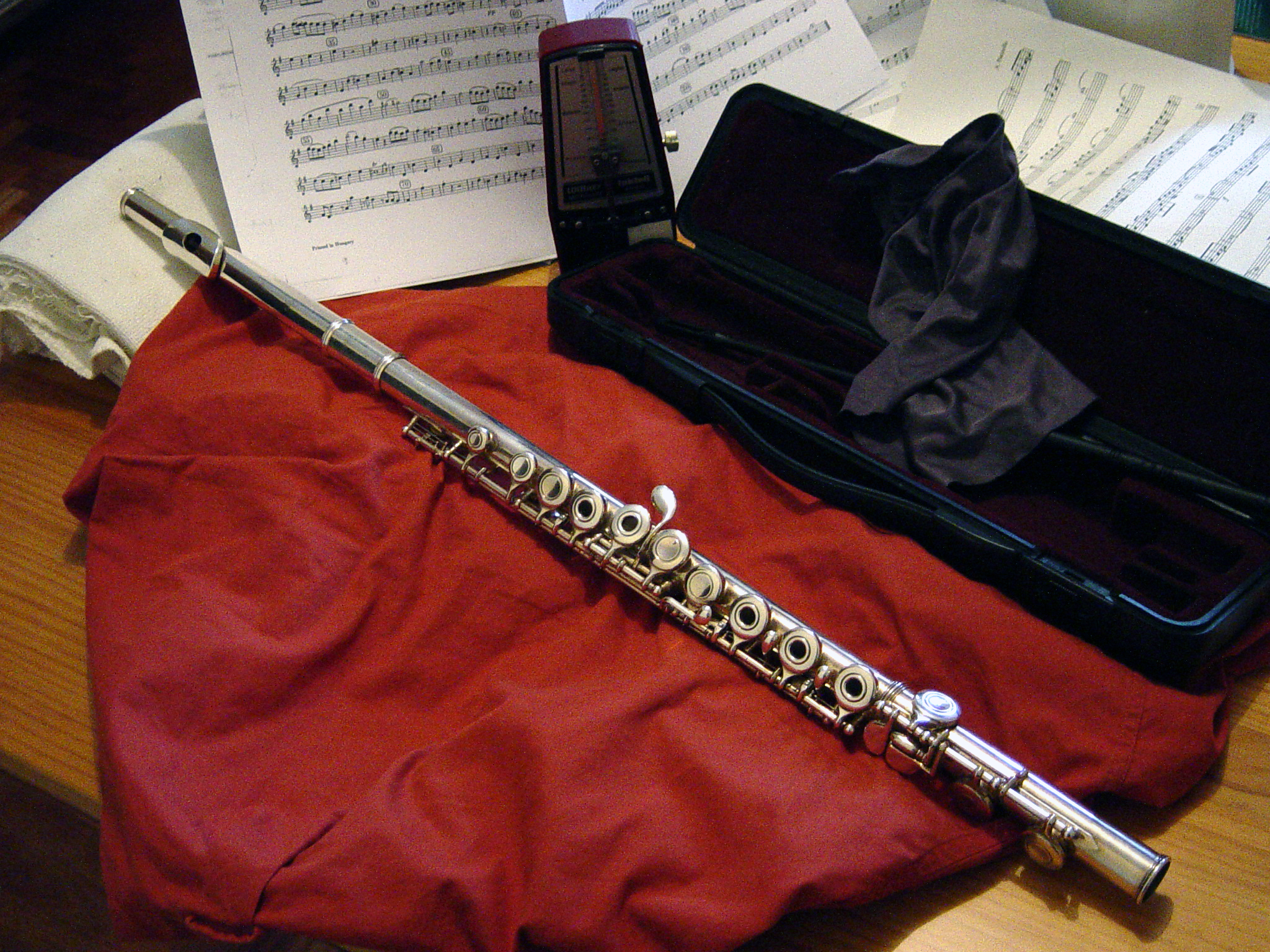
YFL-261 flute

- YFL-A421/B
- YFL-B441

===== Student Models (Series 200) =====
====== Current models ======
- YFL212
- YFL222
- YFL262
- YFL272
- YFL282

====== Discontinued models ======
- YFL-211
- YFL-221
- YFL-261
- YFL-271
- YFL-281

===== Intermediate Models (Series 300 and 400) =====
====== Current models ======
- YFL312
- YFL322
- YFL362
- YFL372
- YFL382
- YFL412
- YFL422
- YFL462
- YFL472
- YFL482

====== Discontinued models ======
- YFL311
- YFL321
- YFL361
- YFL371
- YFL381
- YFL411
- YFL421
- YFL461
- YFL471
- YFL481

Student and intermediate models are numbered in one system. The first number shows the material/series; the second shows if there is an offset G and/or a split E, and the type of keys; and the third shows if the flute is the latest or not. Currently, latest models will end with the number 2, but older models may end with the number 1, or 5. Different suffixes mean different things - 'H' means the flute has a B footjoint; 'AL' means the instrument is part of Yamaha's 'Allegro' lineup of instruments; 'U' means the instrument has a curved headjoint; 'GL' and 'SL' signal the material of the lip-plate (being gold and silver respectively); 'HD' means that the instrument is a high durability instrument.

===== Professional Models (Series 500, 600 and 700) =====
====== Current models ======
- YFL517
- YFL577
- YFL587
- YFL597
- YFL617
- YFL677
- YFL687
- YFL697
- YFL717
- YFL777
- YFL787
- YFL797

====== Discontinued models ======
- YFL514
- YFL574
- YFL584
- YFL594
- YFL614
- YFL674
- YFL684
- YFL694
- YFL714
- YFL774
- YFL784
- YFL794

===== Handmade Models (Series 800W, 800, 900A, 900B and 900C) =====
====== Series 800W models ======
- YFL817W
- YFL874W
- YFL894W

====== Series 800 and 900 Models ======
Current models:

- YFL817
- YFL877
- YFL887
- YFL897
- YFL917
- YFL977
- YFL987
- YFL997

Discontinued models:

- YFL-874
- YFL-881
- YFL-884
- YFL-892
- YFL-894

Additionally, for Series 600 - 900 flutes, the last number will be seven if it is the latest model. Older models may have a 4, or other numbers. Additional suffixes include (but are not limited to): 'W' meaning the flute is wooden; 'CT' for a C# trill.

For series 900 flutes, the suffixes A, B, and C show how much of the flute is gold.

==== Piccolos ====
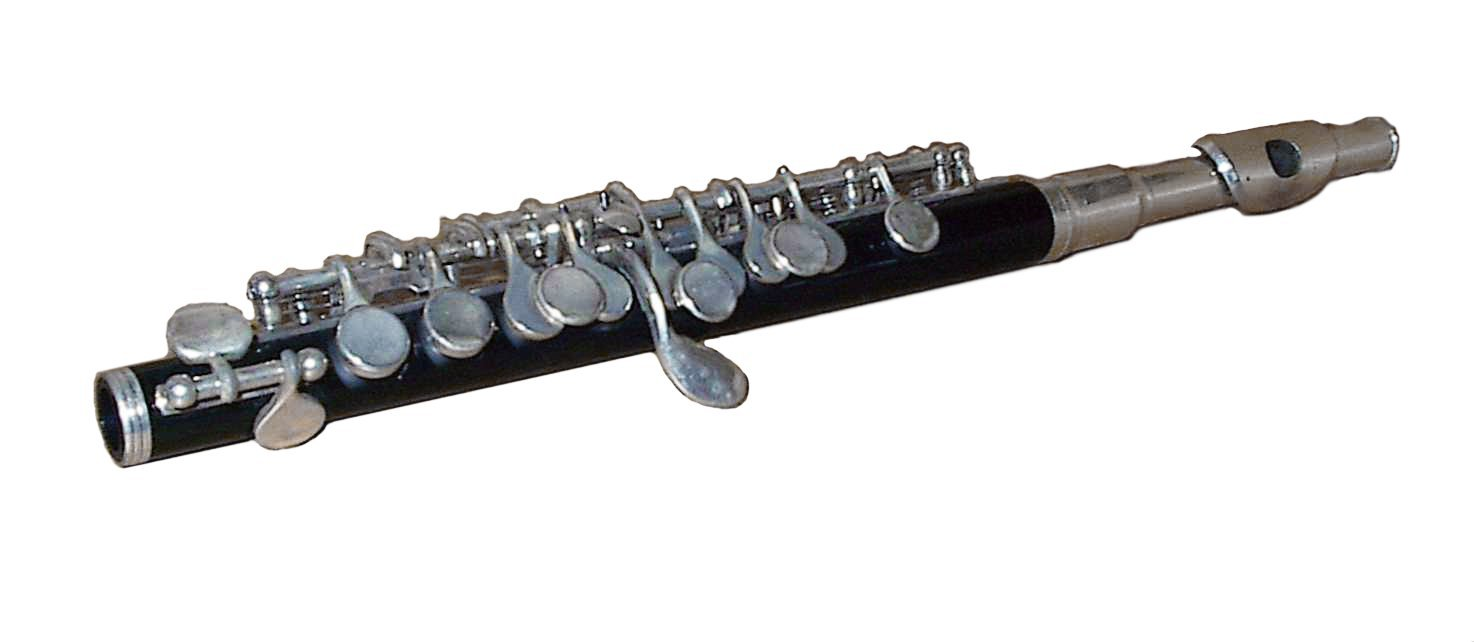
YPC-32 piccolo

- YPC-30
- YPC-31
- YPC-32
- YPC-61
- YPC-62
- YPC-81
- YPC-82
- YPC-87R
- YPC-91
- YPC-92

==== Venova ====
- YVS-100

=== Saxophones ===
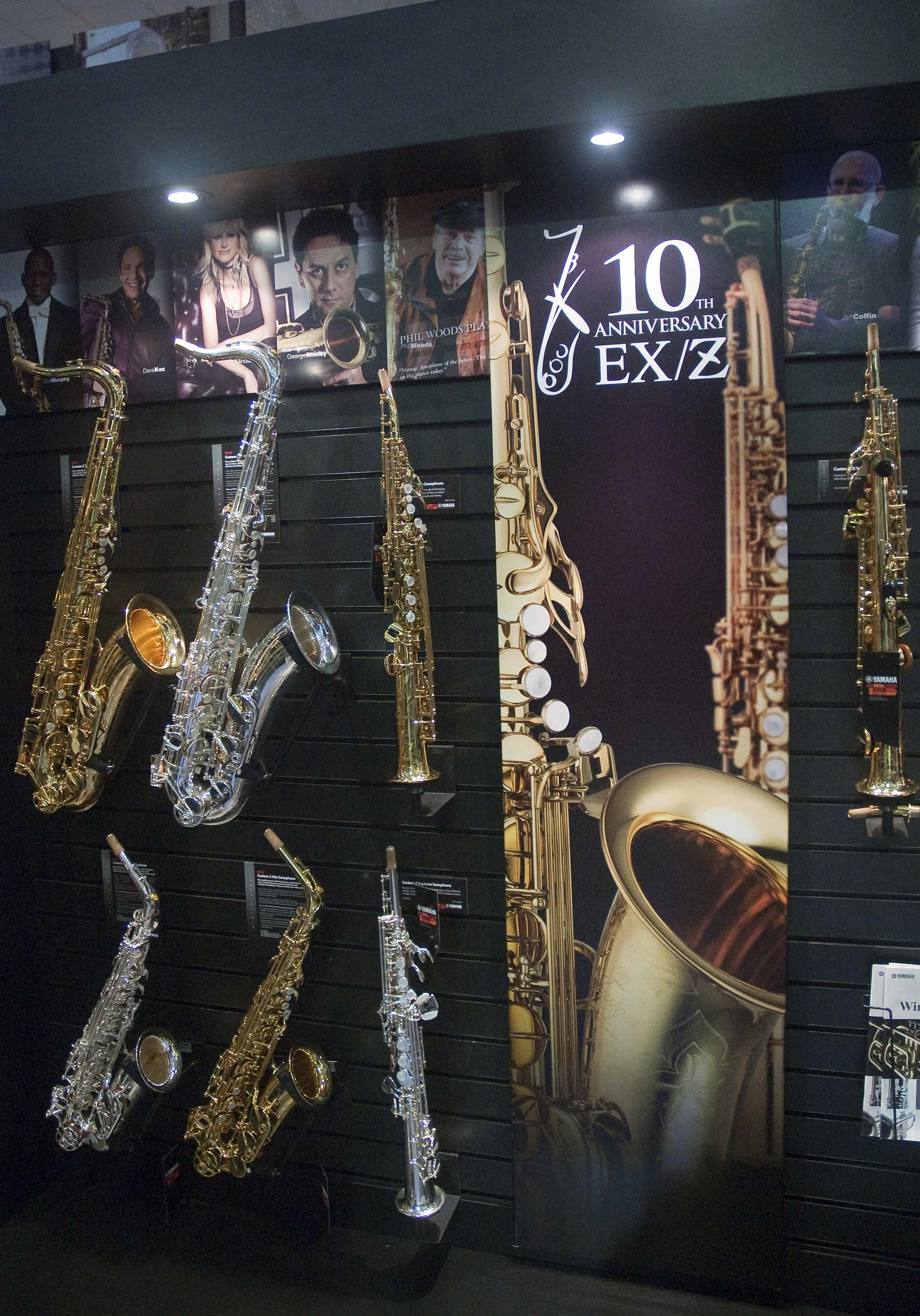
Yamaha Custom Z Saxophones

==== Soprano saxophones ====
- YSS-475II (intermediate grade instrument. Sold mainly in Europe)
- YSS-61 (Yamaha's first professional-grade soprano saxophone)
- YSS-62 (significantly updated version of YSS-61. Professional-grade instrument)
- YSS-675 (Custom model)
- YSS-875 (Custom model)
- YSS-875EX (Custom model)
- YSS-82Z(R) (One-piece custom model)

==== Alto saxophones ====
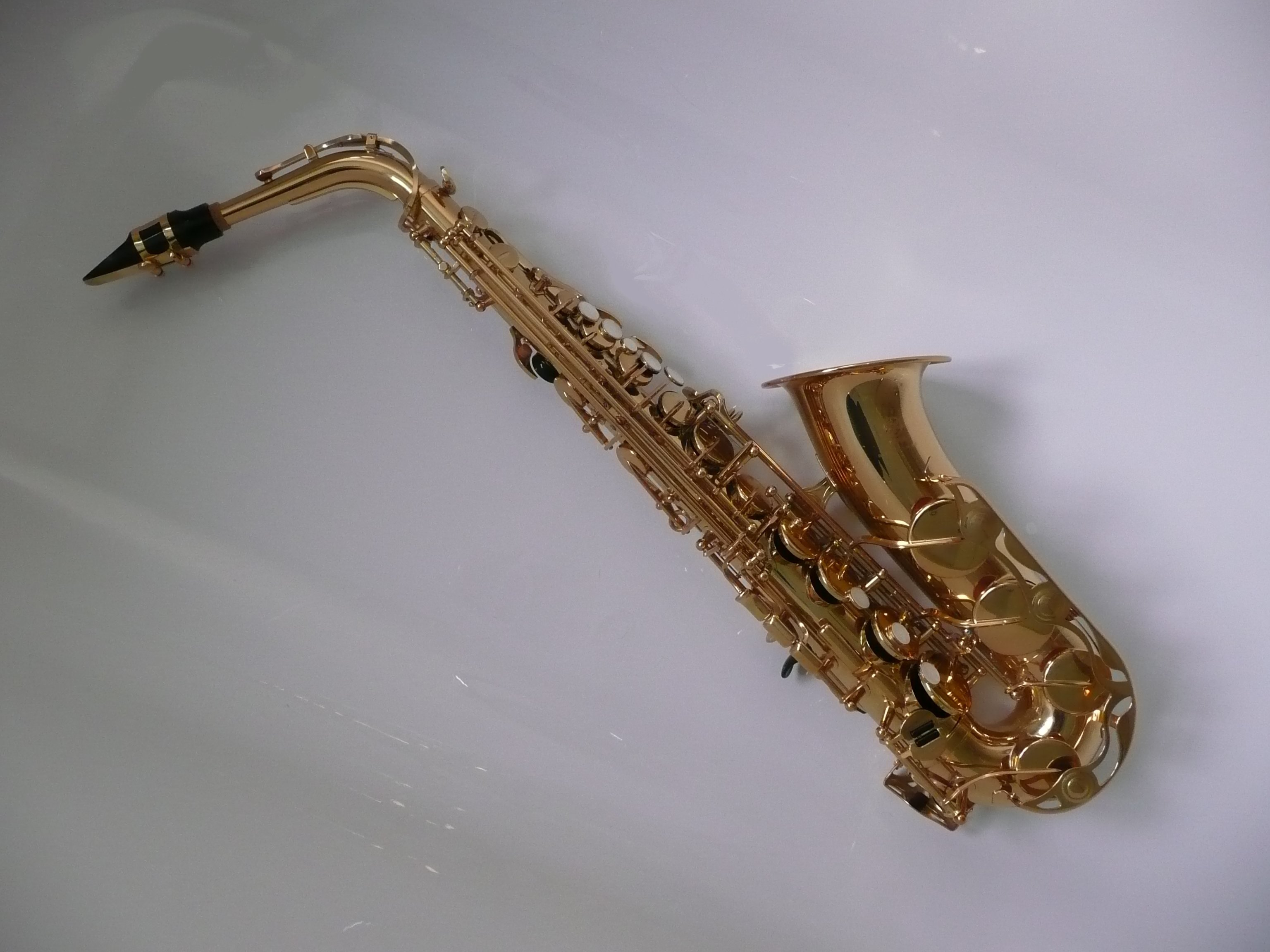
Yamaha YAS-25 alto saxophone

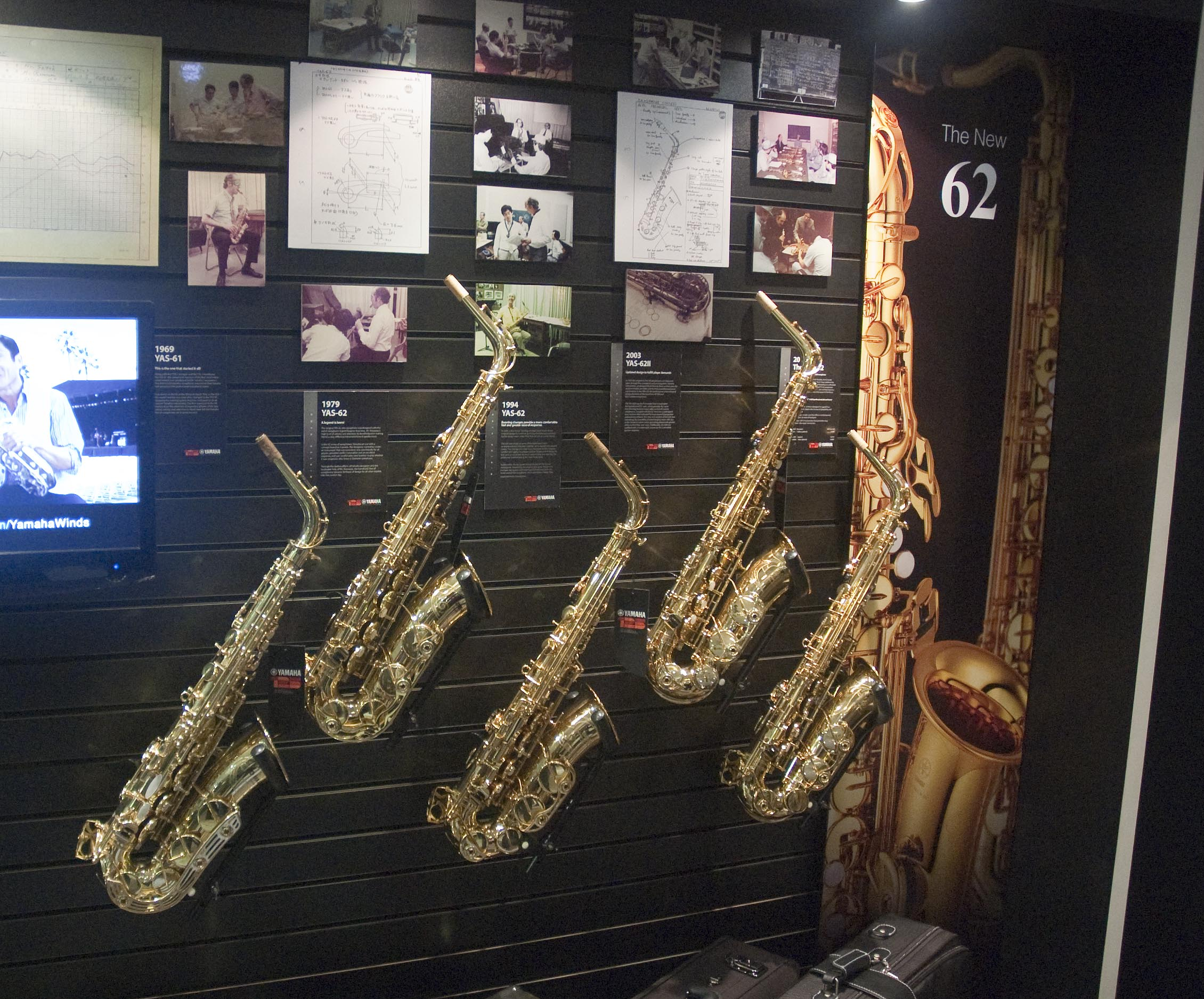
YAS-61 (1969), YAS-62 (1979), YAS-62 (1994), YAS-62II (2003), YAS-62III (2013)

- YAS-21 (Yamaha's first student-grade alto sax)
- YAS 22 (same as 21 body and key work, more copper look lacquer)
- YAS-23 (student-grade instrument which replaced the YAS-21)
- YAS-25 (identical to YAS-23, but has a high F♯ key and improved octave-key mechanism)
- AS-100 (identical to YAS-23. Sold outside Europe & N.America)
- YAS-275 (successor to the YAS-25. Made in Indonesia. Sold mainly in Europe)
- YAS-280 (successor to the YAS-275)
- YAS-31
- YAS-32 (intermediate grade instrument, similar to YAS-52. Superseded by the YAS-475)
- YAS-475 (intermediate grade instrument. Sold mainly in Europe)
- YAS-480 (intermediate grade instrument)
- YAS-52 (intermediate grade instrument. Sold mainly in the USA)
- YAS-61 (Yamaha's first professional-grade alto with purple logo. Has non-ribbed construction and real mother of pearl key-touches)
- YAS-62 (Mk 1 version of YAS-62 with purple logo, ribbed construction and real MOP key-touches)
- YAS-62ll (Mk 2 version with different neck design, slightly different key-work and key-touches are made from plastic)
- YAS-62IlI (Mk 3 version with new style neck design, integrated key posts and other changes)
- YAS-82Z (Custom model)
- YAS-82ZII (Custom model)
- YAS-855 (Custom model)
- YAS-875 (Custom model)
- YAS-875EX (Custom model)
- YAS-875EXW (Custom model)

==== Tenor saxophones ====
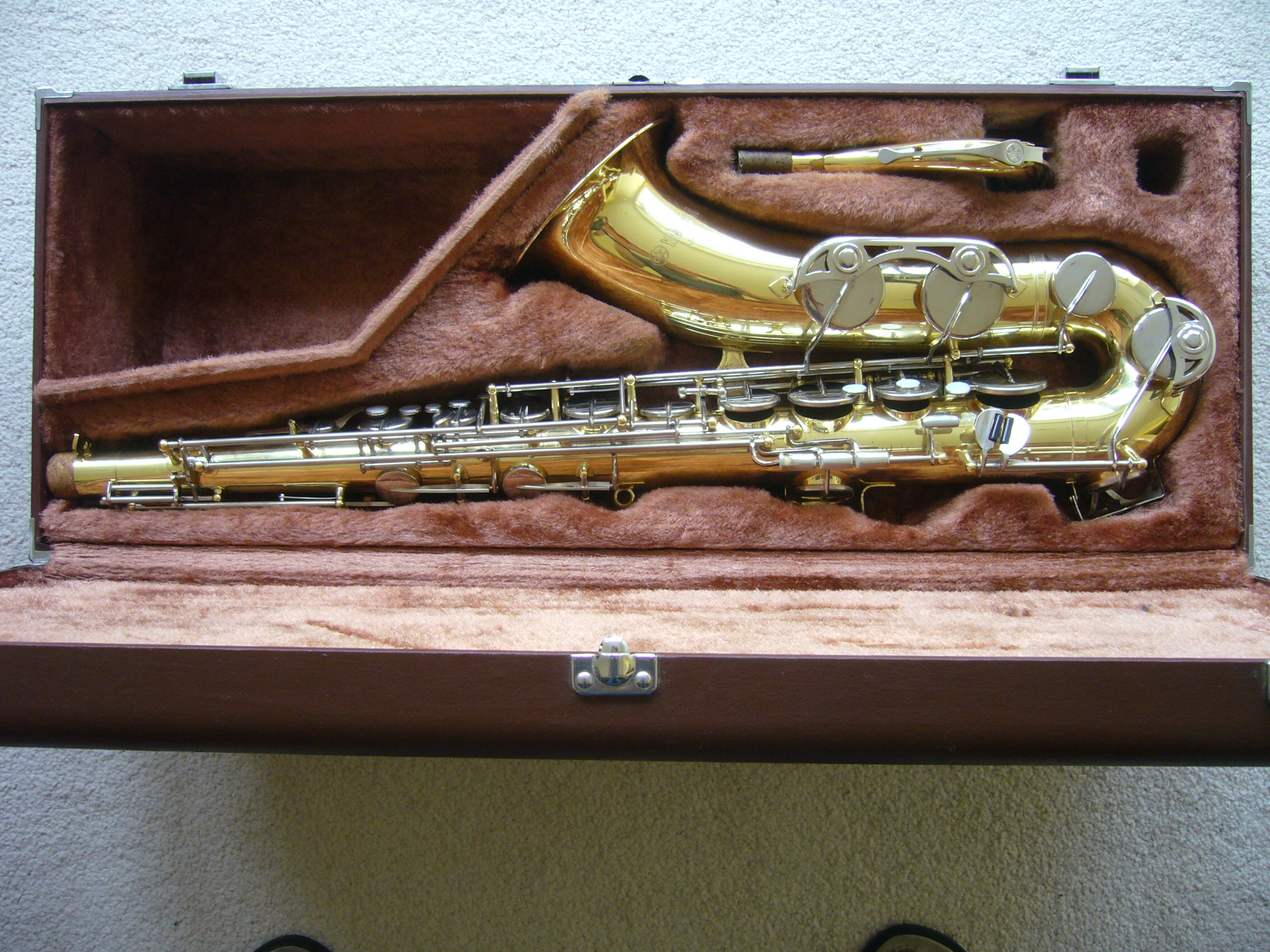
YTS-23 tenor saxophone made in 1986

- YTS-21 (Yamaha's first student-grade tenor sax) (Gold and silver color lacquer)
- YTS 22 (almost exact replica of YTS 21 but with pinkish color lacquer)
- YTS-23 (student-grade instrument which replaced the YTS-21)
- YTS-25 (identical to YTS-23, but has a high F♯ key and improved octave-key mechanism)
- TS-100 (identical to YTS-23. Sold outside Europe & N.America)
- YTS-31 (YTS 61 body and keys but no engraving or pearls on F♯s)
- YTS-32 (intermediate grade instrument, similar to YTS-52. Superseded by the YTS-475)
- YTS-52 (intermediate grade instrument. Sold mainly in the USA)
- YTS-275 (successor to the YTS-25. Made in Indonesia)
- YTS-280 (successor to the YTS-275)
- YTS-475 (intermediate grade instrument. Sold mainly in Europe)
- YTS-480
- YTS-61 (Yamaha's first professional-grade tenor sax)
- YTS-62 (Mk 1 version of YTS-62 with purple logo and real mother of pearl key-touches)
- YTS-62II (Mk 2 version with different neck design and key-touches are made from plastic)
- YTS-62III (Mk 3 version with different neck design)
- YTS-82Z (Custom model)
- YTS-855 (Custom model)
- YTS-875 (Custom model)
- YTS-875EX (Custom model)

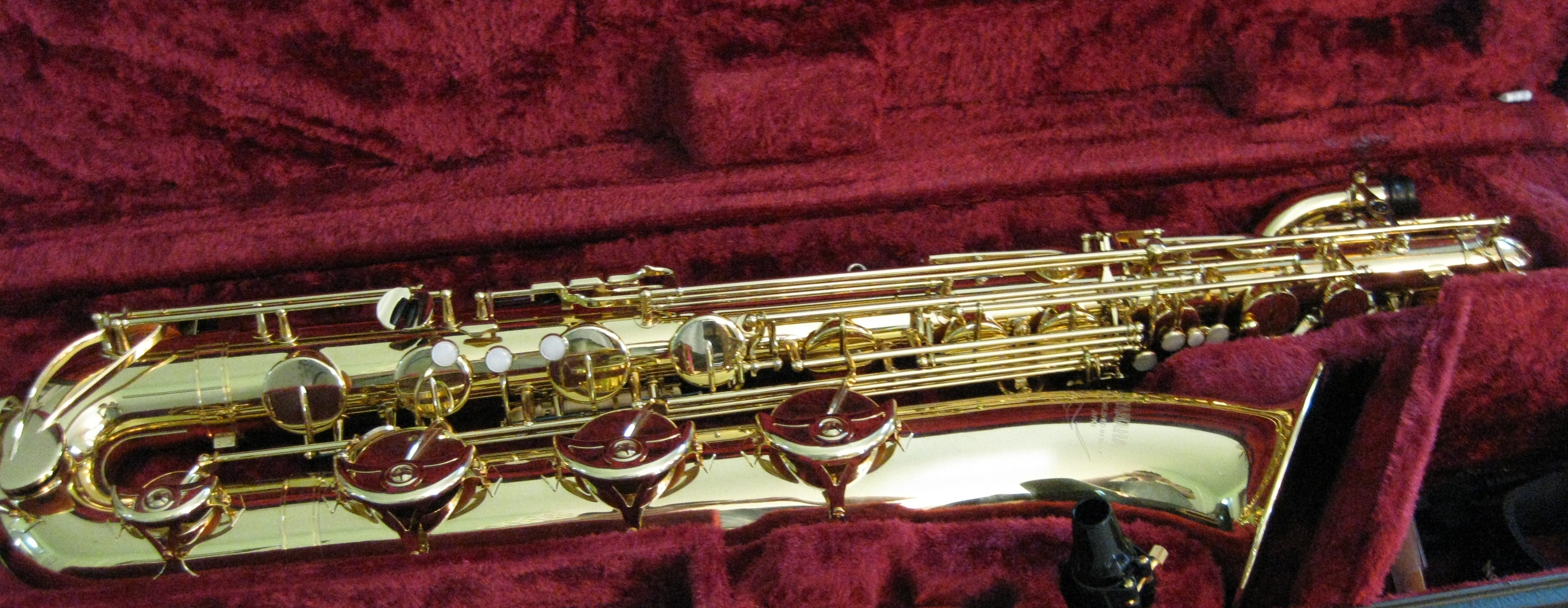
Yamaha baritone saxophone

==== Baritone saxophones ====
- YBS-32 (intermediate grade instrument)
- YBS-52
- YBS-61 (Yamaha's first professional-grade baritone sax)
- YBS-62
- YBS-62II
- YBS-82

=== Sirens ===
Between 1950 and 1998, Yamaha produced a form of outdoor warning siren which was designed to play music, rather than alert the public of danger. These were created by the president of Yamaha at the time to harness the sheer sound output of a siren to play music, and to ease the fears and memory of war and air raids for the public. These sirens became "symbols of peace" and were widely installed on department stores and city halls. They are often used to determine certain times of day, such as an "end of day" signal. These sirens are also known as "musical sirens".

Using several mechanical sirens tuned to a specific octave, the siren would use either electromagnetic or solenoid-driven sliding dampers which would open to allow air to enter each siren to play a musical note, or close to silence each siren. These sirens could be played directly with a keyboard located in a control station, or played automatically through a music box-like mechanism.

There were two distinct generations produced, with the first being a 5-meter long siren with 10 siren units on a common driveshaft, and the second being a vertical unit inside of a box, which contained the siren units and had two shafts connected through belts to make it more compact. These could be controlled through a MIDI controller, instead of the music box system.

Production ended on these sirens in 1998, with Yamaha ceasing support for them in 2011. Most of these musical sirens have been decommissioned as parts became scarce or unavailable, although some units still remain in service today.

== Audio ==
=== Music production ===
==== Recorders ====
===== Digital mixing studio =====
- n12 / n8 (2007)
- MW8CX / MW10C / MW12C / MW12CX (2007)
- MW10 / MW12 (2006)
- 01X (2003)
- DSP Factory DS2416 (digital mixing card (PCI) for PC/Mac, based on 02R)

===== Audio workstations =====
- AW1600 (2005, 24bit/16tr(8rec)/36in mixer)
- AW2400 (2005, 24bit/24tr(12rec)/48in mixer)
- AW16G (2002, 24bit/16tr(8rec)/36ch mixer)
- AW2816 (2001, 24bit/16tr/28ch mixer)
- AW4416 (2000, 24bit/16tr/44ch mixer)
- D24 (1998, 24bit/8tr rackmount)

===== Multitrack recorders =====
multitrack recorders for music creation

- DMR8 (1991/2 digital multitrack recorder/8mm tape/20-bit/stationary head)
- DRU8 (1990, 8tr/original 8mm dat)

MD series (MiniDisc)

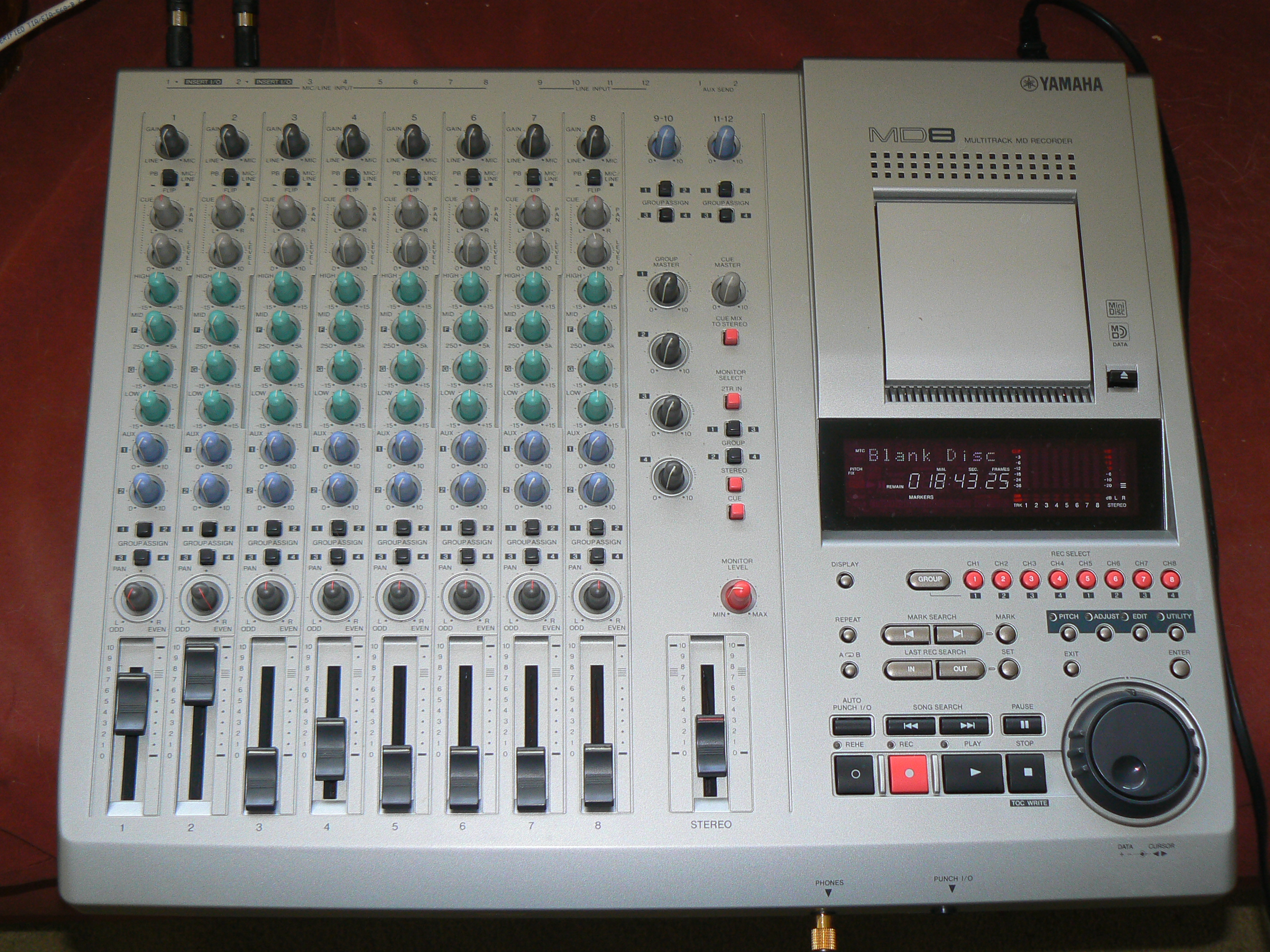
MD8

- MD4 / MD4S (1996/1999)
- MD8 (1998)

CMX series (Compact Cassette)

- CMX1 (1985)
- CMX3 (1988)
- CMX100 / CMX100II / CMX100III (1988/1989/1991)

MT series (Compact Cassette)

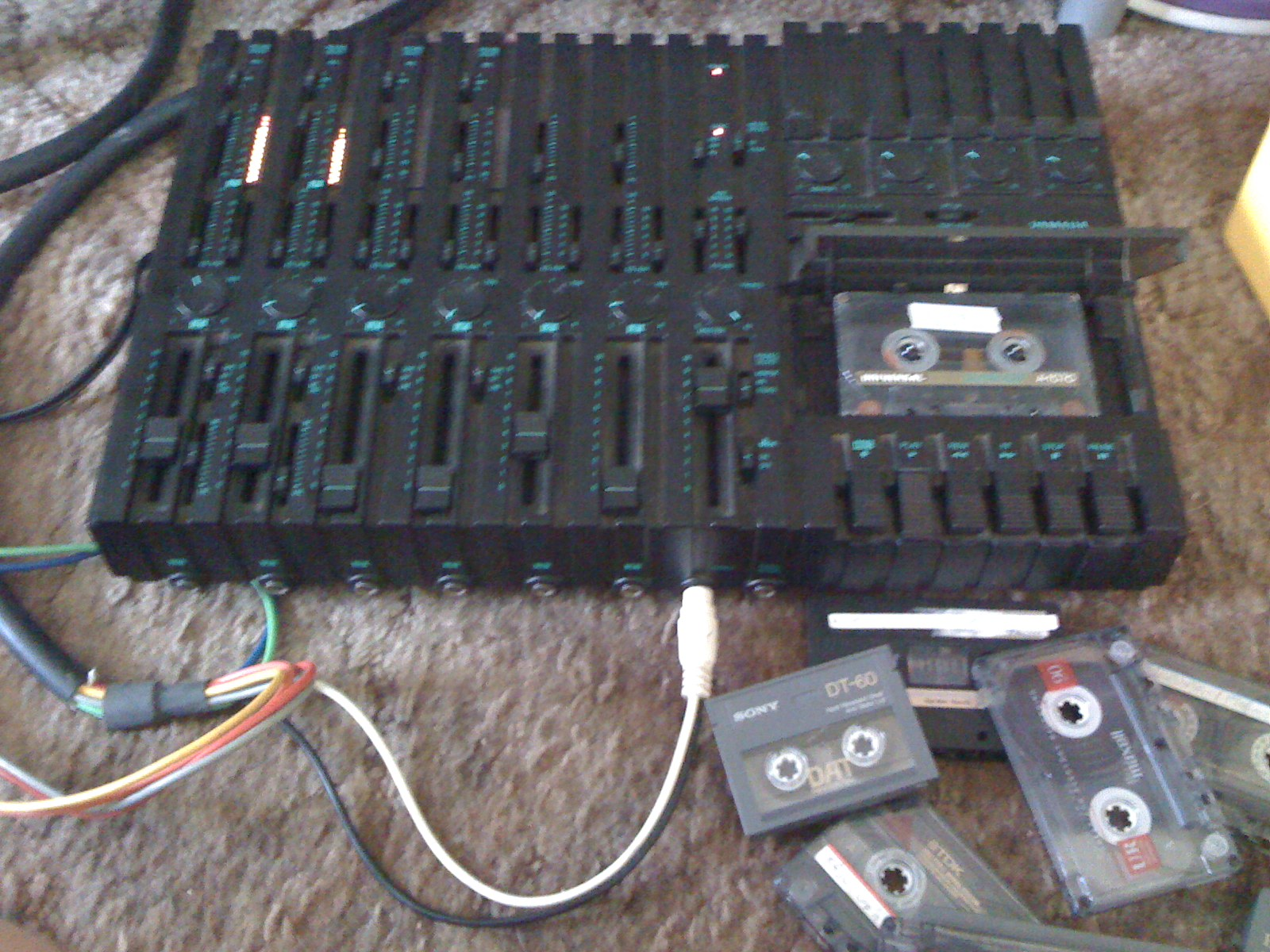
MT2X 4-Track Cassette Recorder

- MT1X (1998)
- MT2X (1998–1999)
- MT4X (1999) (correct year, was 1994)
- MT8X (1999)
- MT8X II (2000)
- MT44 / MT44D (1982/1984)
- MT50 (1994)
- MT-100 (1988)
- MT120 / MT120S (1991)
- MT400 (1999)

===== Pocket recorders =====
Voice recorder type

- Pocketrak CX / C24 / W24 (2008/2010)

==== Audio interfaces ====
- AG03 / AG06 (2015, USB)
- AUDIOGRAM3 / AUDIOGRAM6 (2008, USB)
- CBX-D3 (1995) — 4tr/2rec, SCSI)
- CBX-D5 (1993)
- DS2416 (1998) — PCI sound card with the mixing engine of the 02R console.
- GO44 / GO46 (FireWire)
- Sound Edge SW20 PC (1995, ISA sound card using OPTi MediaChips, Analog Devices SoundPort, and Yamaha YMF278)
- SW60XG (1995) — ISA version of the DB60XG.
- SW1000XG (1998) — PCI sound card with XG tone generator, equivalent with MU100.
- UW10 (USB)
- UW500 (USB)

A/D converters

- AD808 (1988, A/D)
- AD2X (1990, A/D)
- AD8X (1990, A/D & S/PDIF converter) (Note: "My gear". Keep Sound Production. Archived from the original on 30 June 2010. (images))

D/A converters

- DA8X (1990, D/A & S/PDIF converter)
- DA202 (1988, D/A)
- DA824 (1990, D/A)

Other converters

- FMC8 (1991 - format converter Yamaha to Sony or Melco (ProDigi) format)

=== Pro audio ===
==== Mixing consoles ====
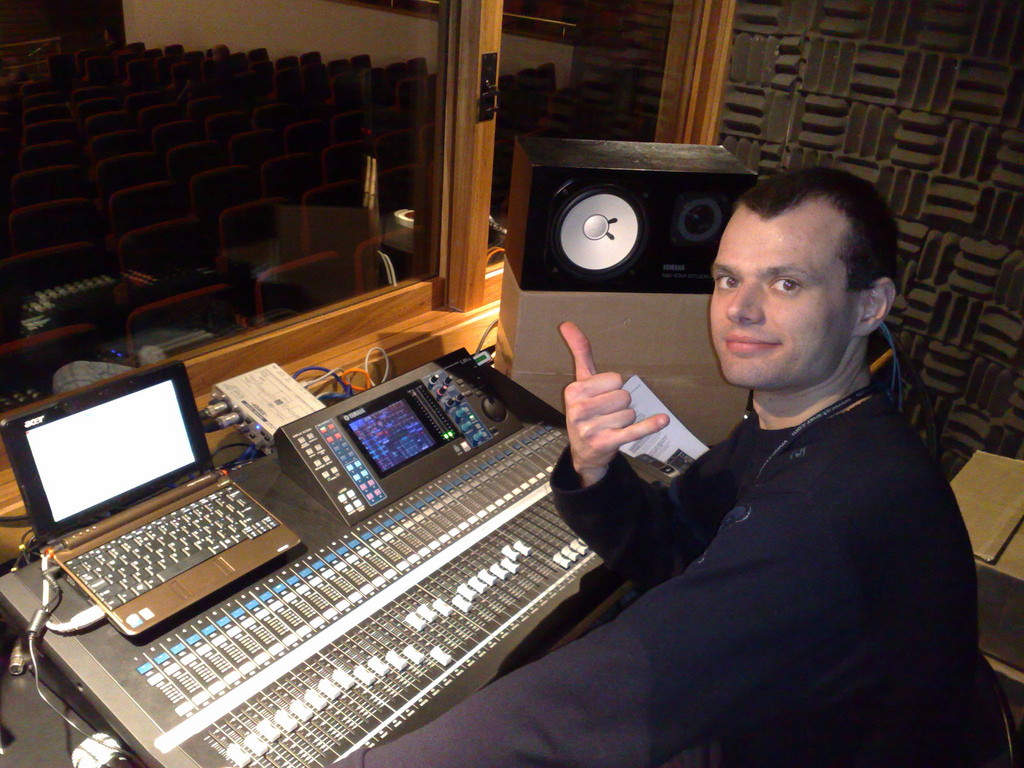
LS9-32

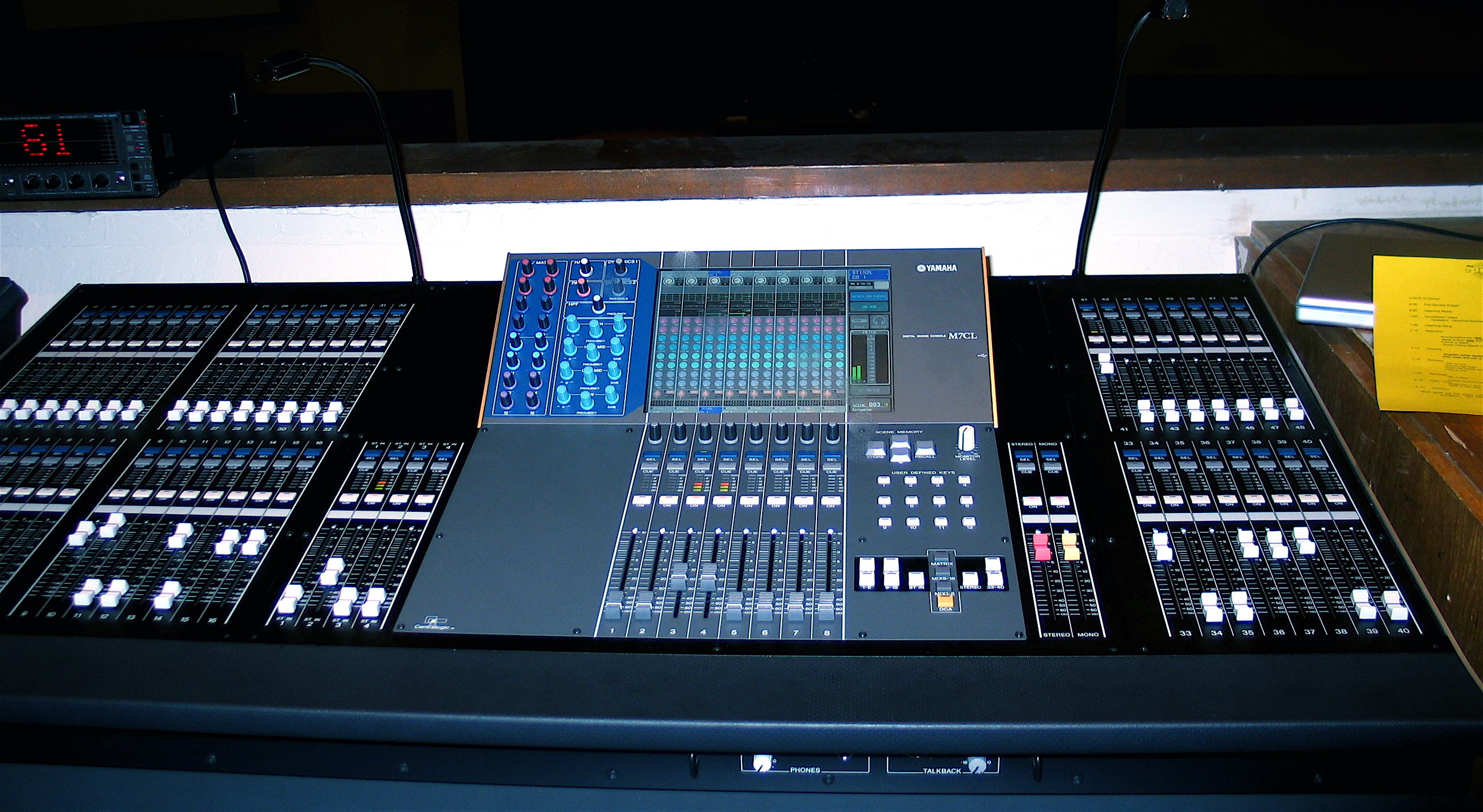
M7CL

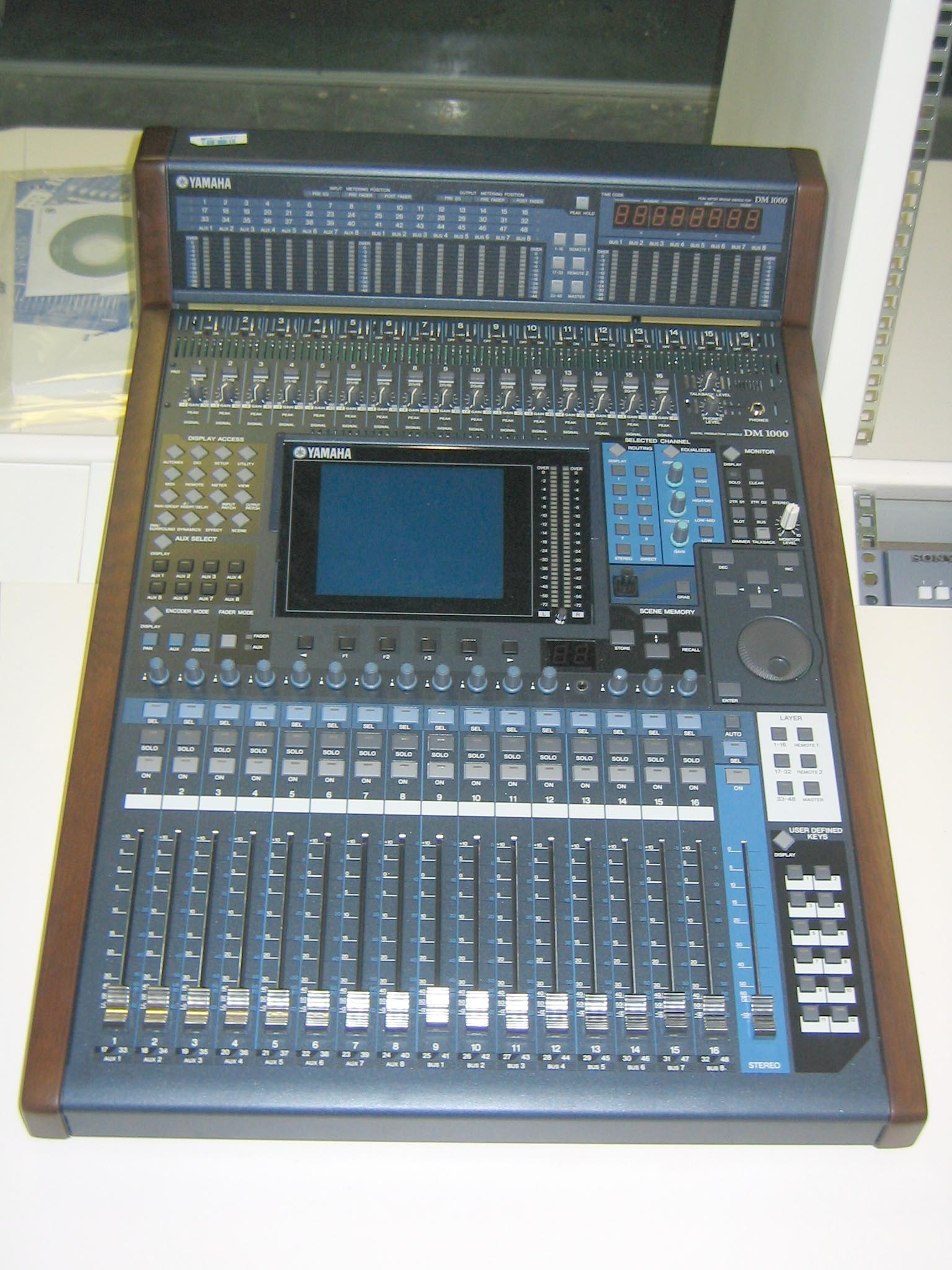
DM1000

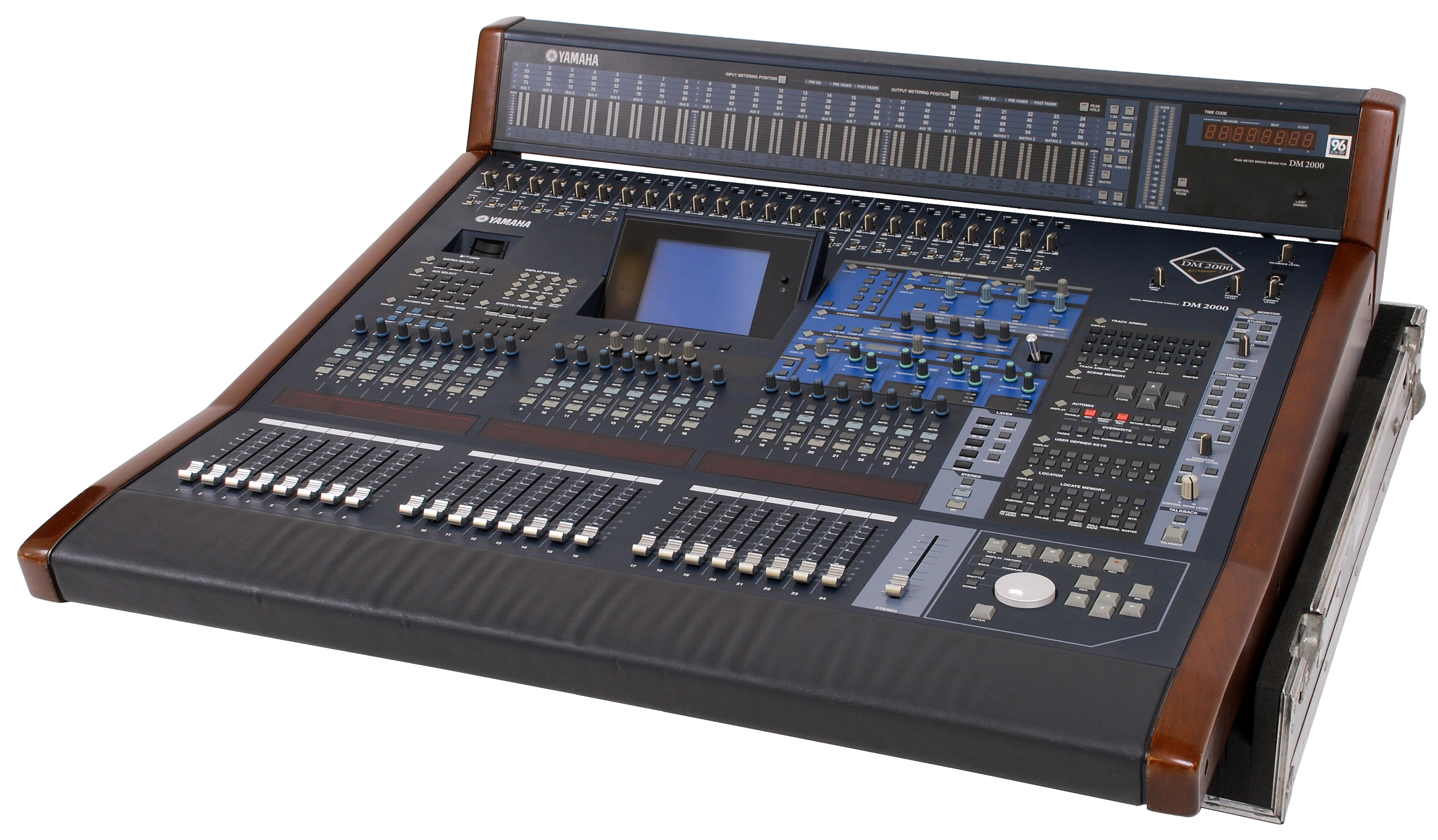
DM2000V2

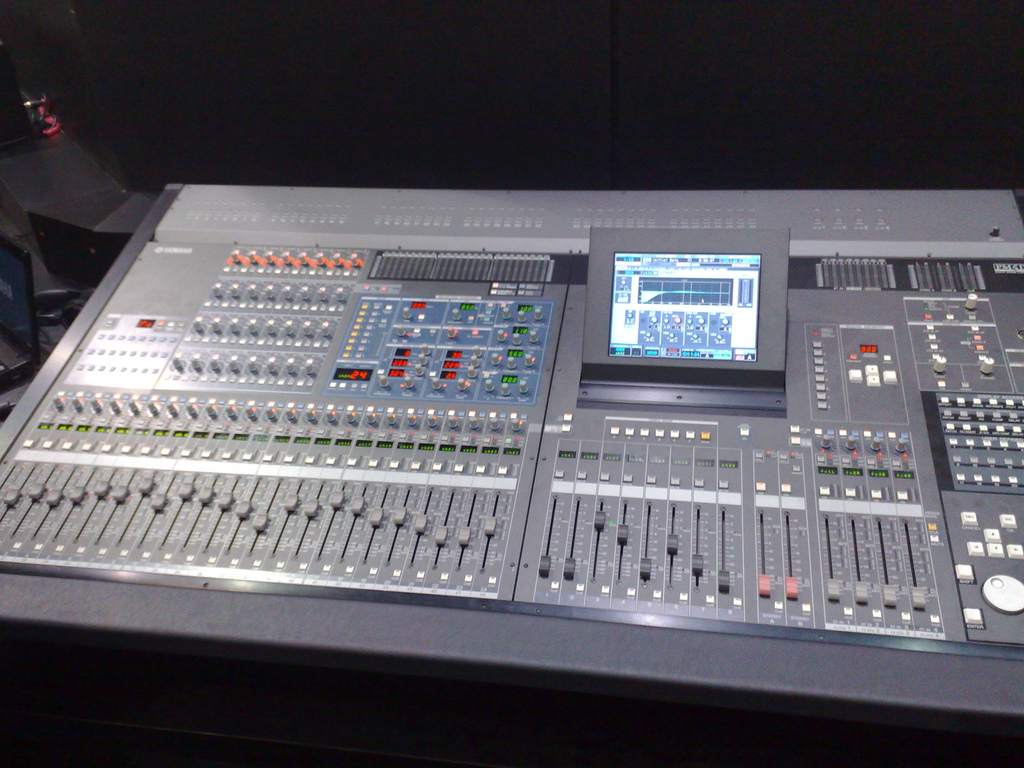
PM5D

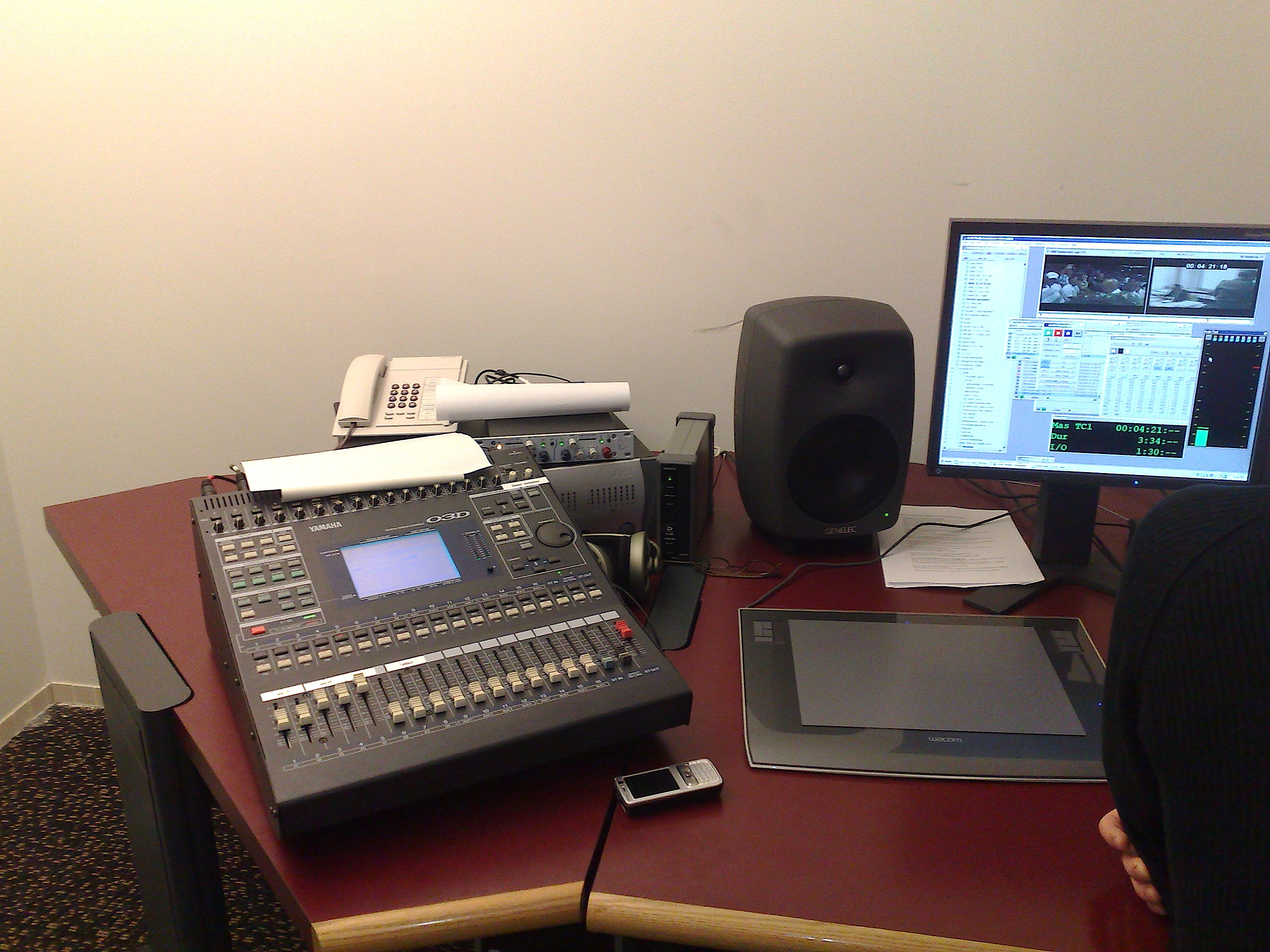
03D

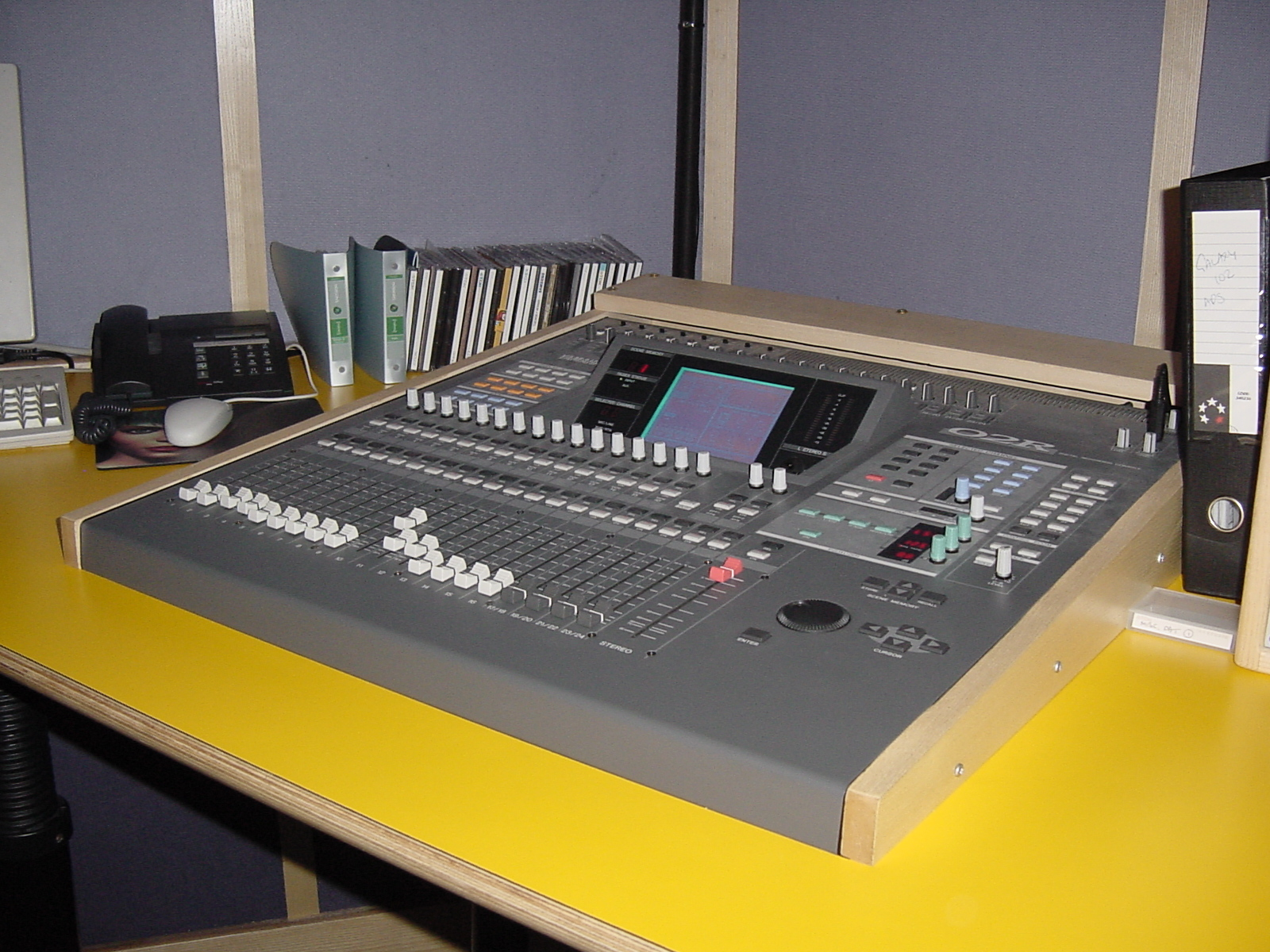
02R

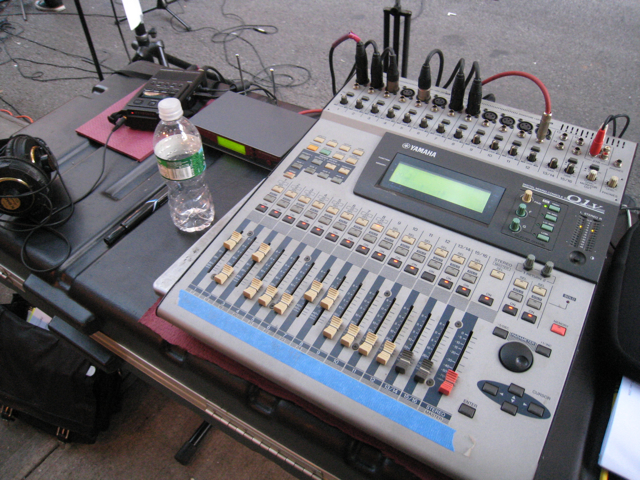
01v

===== Digital mixing consoles =====
- DM5 (2026)
- MGX (2026)
- DM7 (2023)
- DM3 (2023)
- PM3/PM5 (Rivage) (2020)
- PM7 (Rivage) (2018)
- TF1/TF3/TF5 (2016)
- PM10 (Rivage) (2016)
- QL1 /QL5 (2014)
- CL1/CL3/CL5 (2012)
- M7CL (2005/2010)
- LS9 (2006)
- PM1D (2001)
- PM5D (2004)
- DM2000 (2002)
- DM1000 (2003)
- IMX644 (2009, digital installation mixer)
- 03D (1997)
- 02R / 02R96 (1995/2002)
- 01V / 01V96 (1998/2003)
- ProMix01 (1994)
- DMC1000 (1991)
- DMP7/ DMP7-D (1987/1988)
- DMP9-16 (1993)
- DMP11 (1988)
- DMR8 (1990)

===== Analog mixing consoles =====
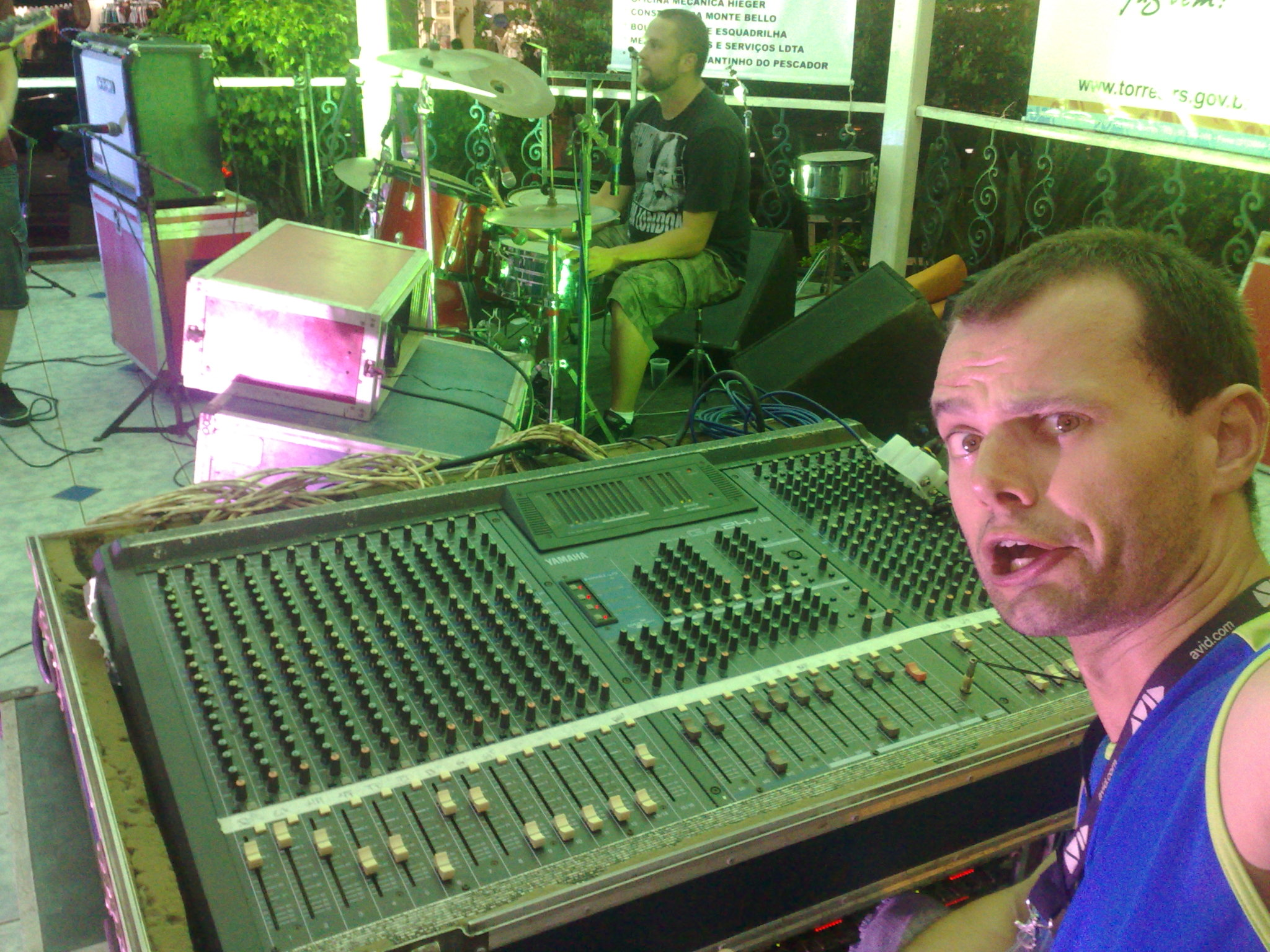
GA24/12

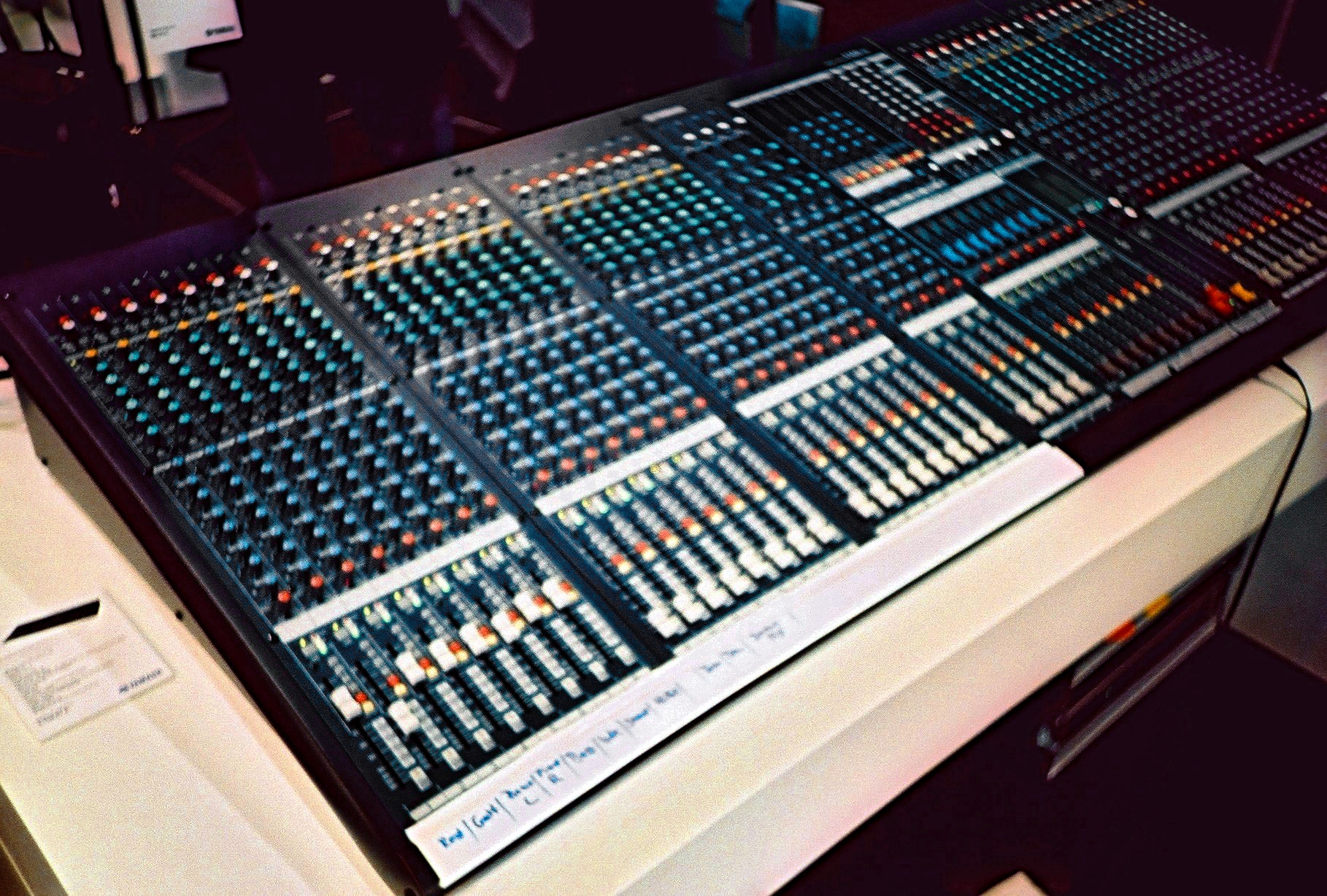
IM8-40

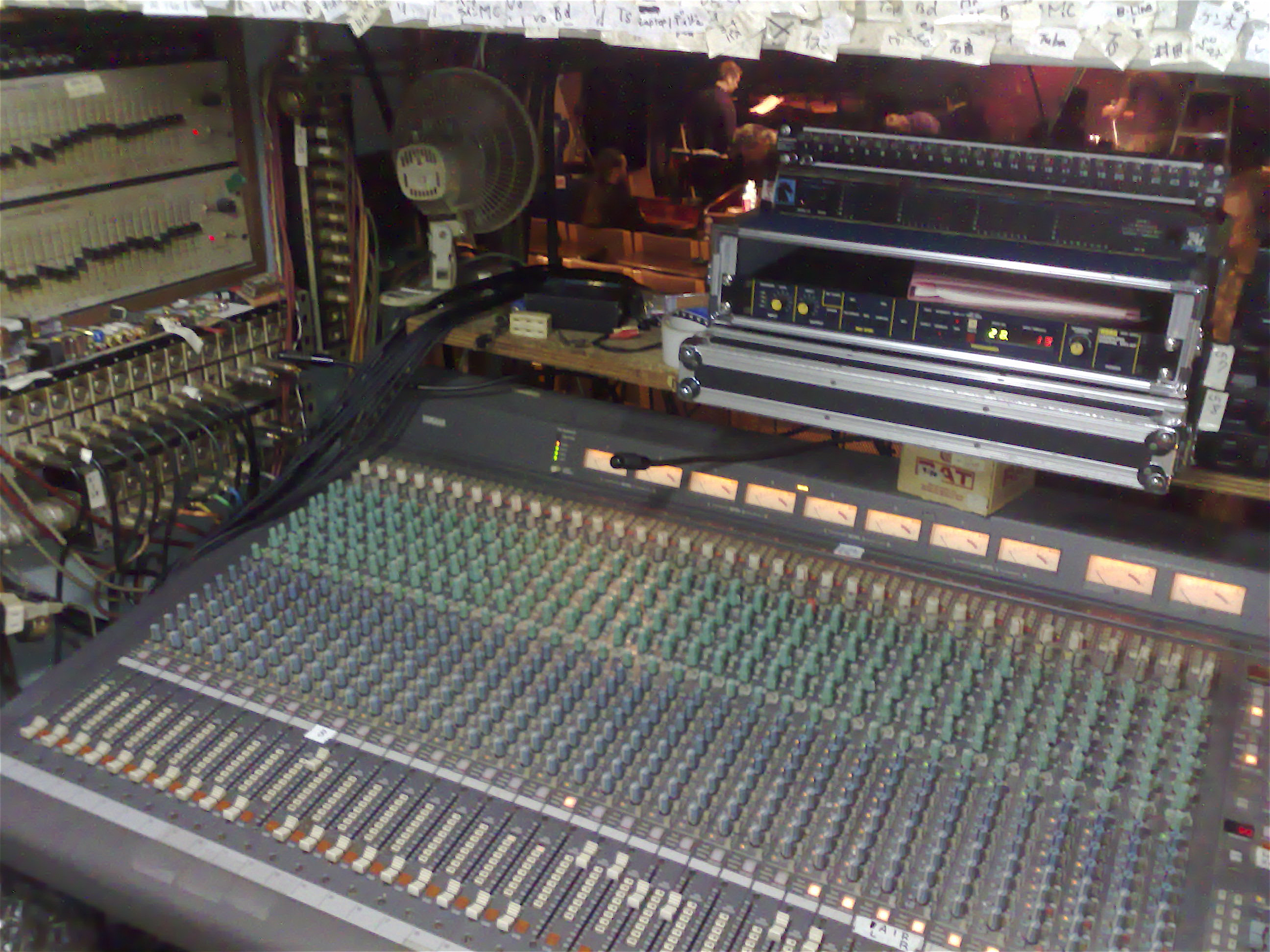
PM3500-40

- IM8

GA series

- GA24/12
- GA32/12

PM series

- PM400 series
- PM1000 series
- PM1800A series
- PM2000 series
- PM3000 series
- PM3500 series
- PM4000 series
- PM5000 series

==== Analog audio mixers ====
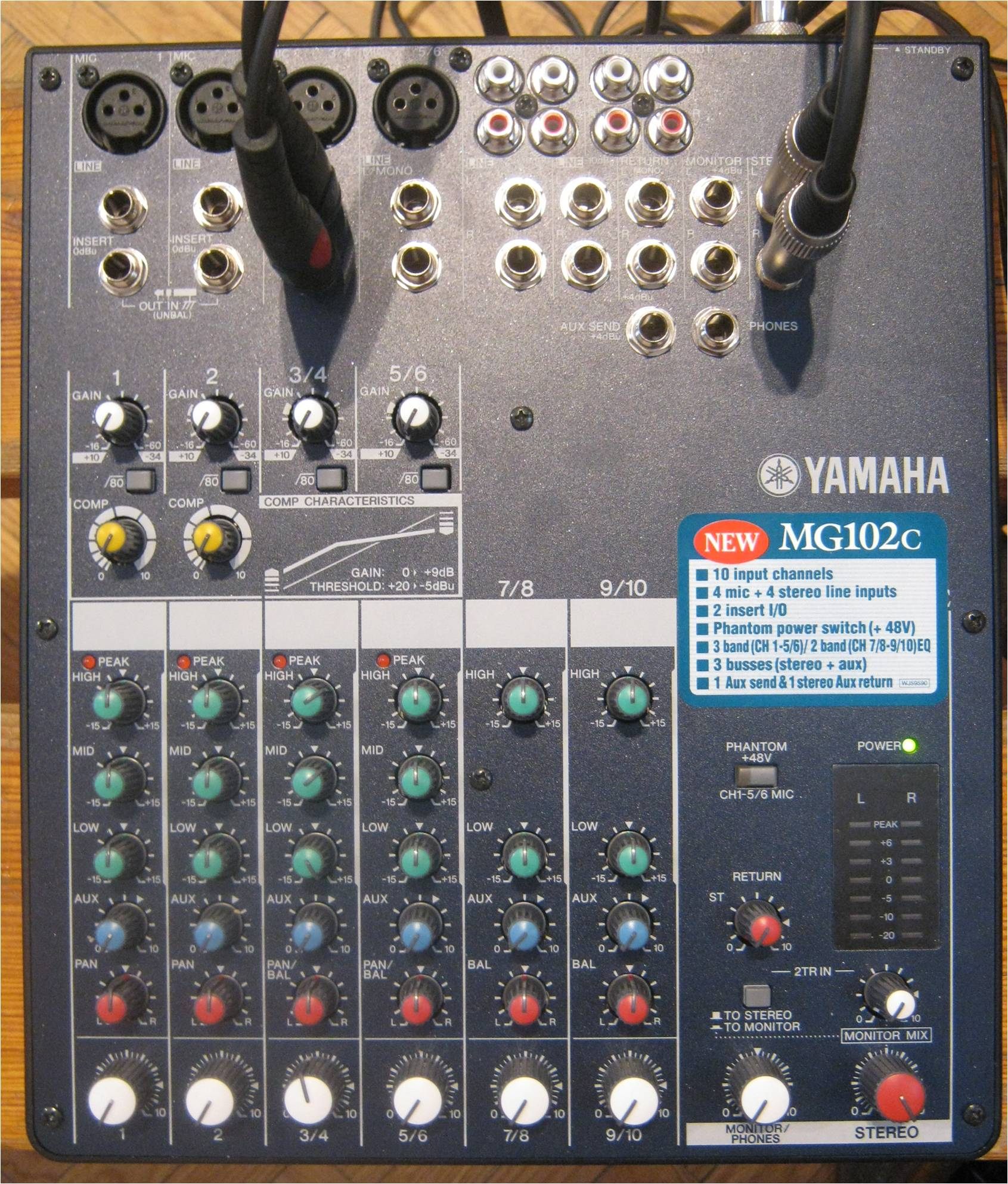
MG102c

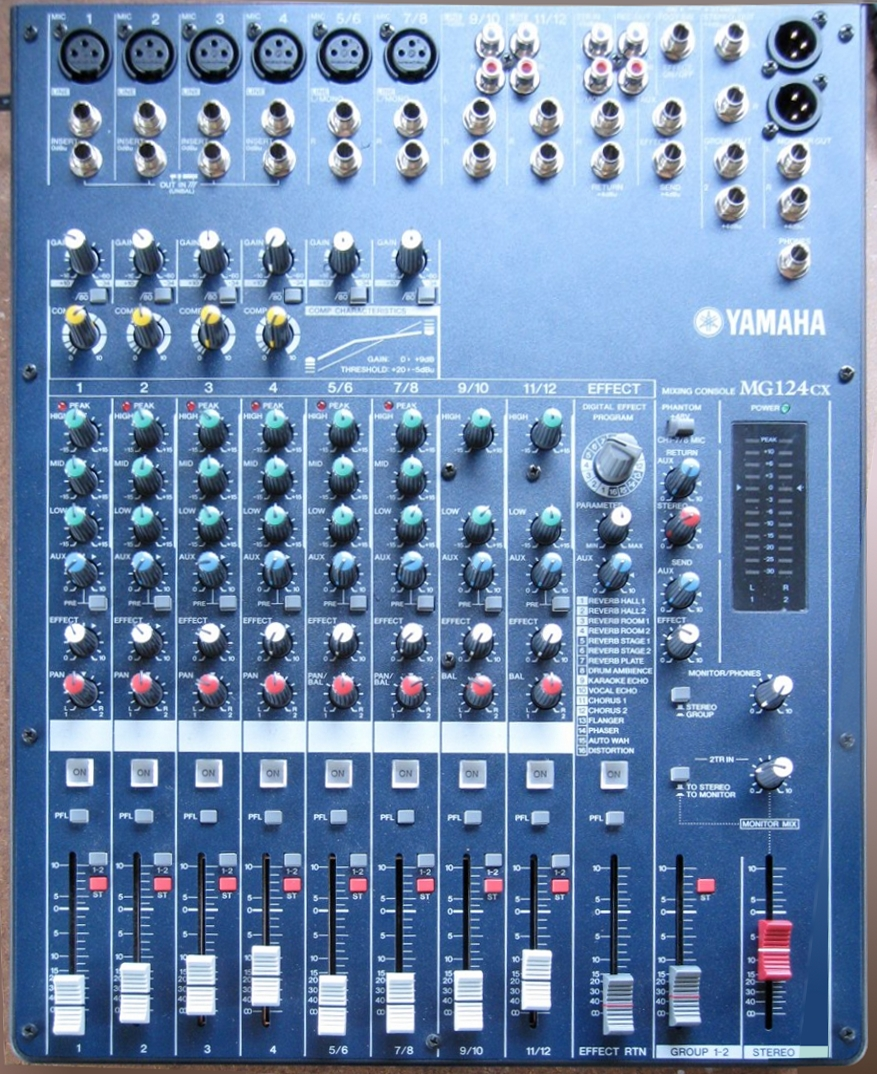
MG124cx

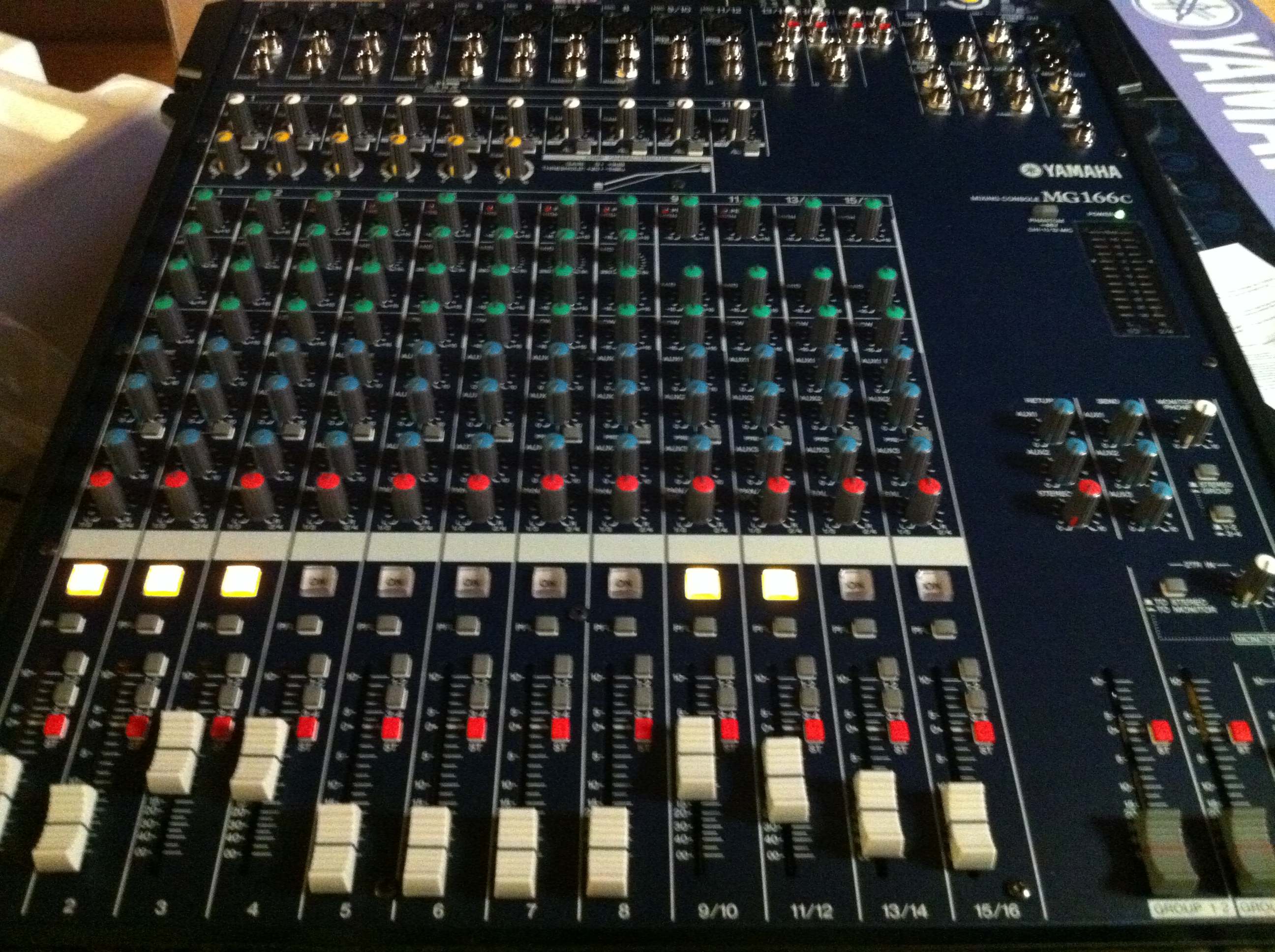
MG166c

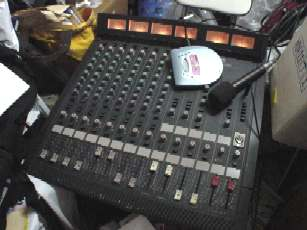
MR-842

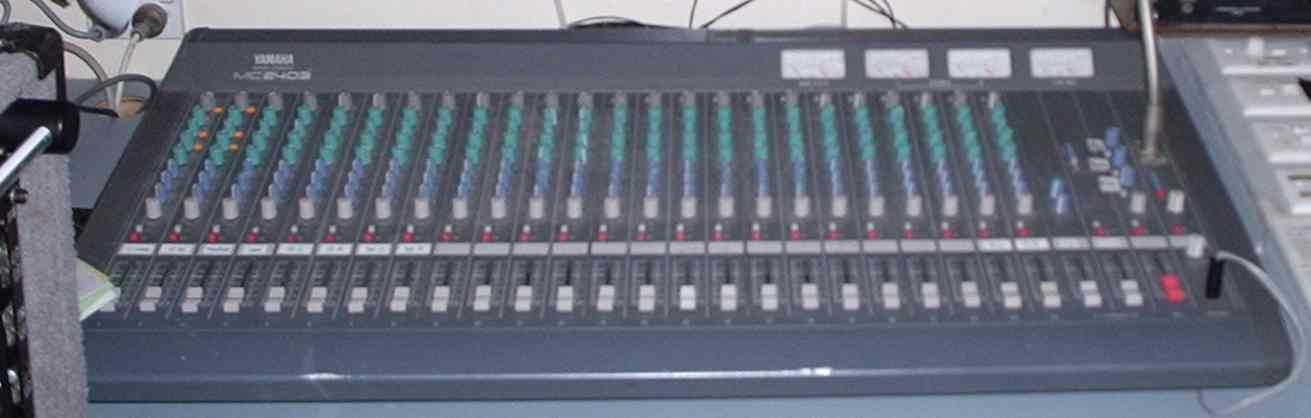
MC2403

MG series (FX/C/CX/USB)

- MG82CX
- MG10/2 / MG102C
- MG12/4 / MG124C / MG124CX
- MG16/6FX / MG166C / MG166CX / MG166C-USB / MG166CX-USB
- MG206C / MG206C-USB
- MG24/14FX
- MG32/14FX

GF series
MC series

- MC-802
- MC-1202
- MC-1602
- MC-2403
- MC-3204
- MC-3204 II

MR series

- MR-842

MX series

==== Powered mixers ====
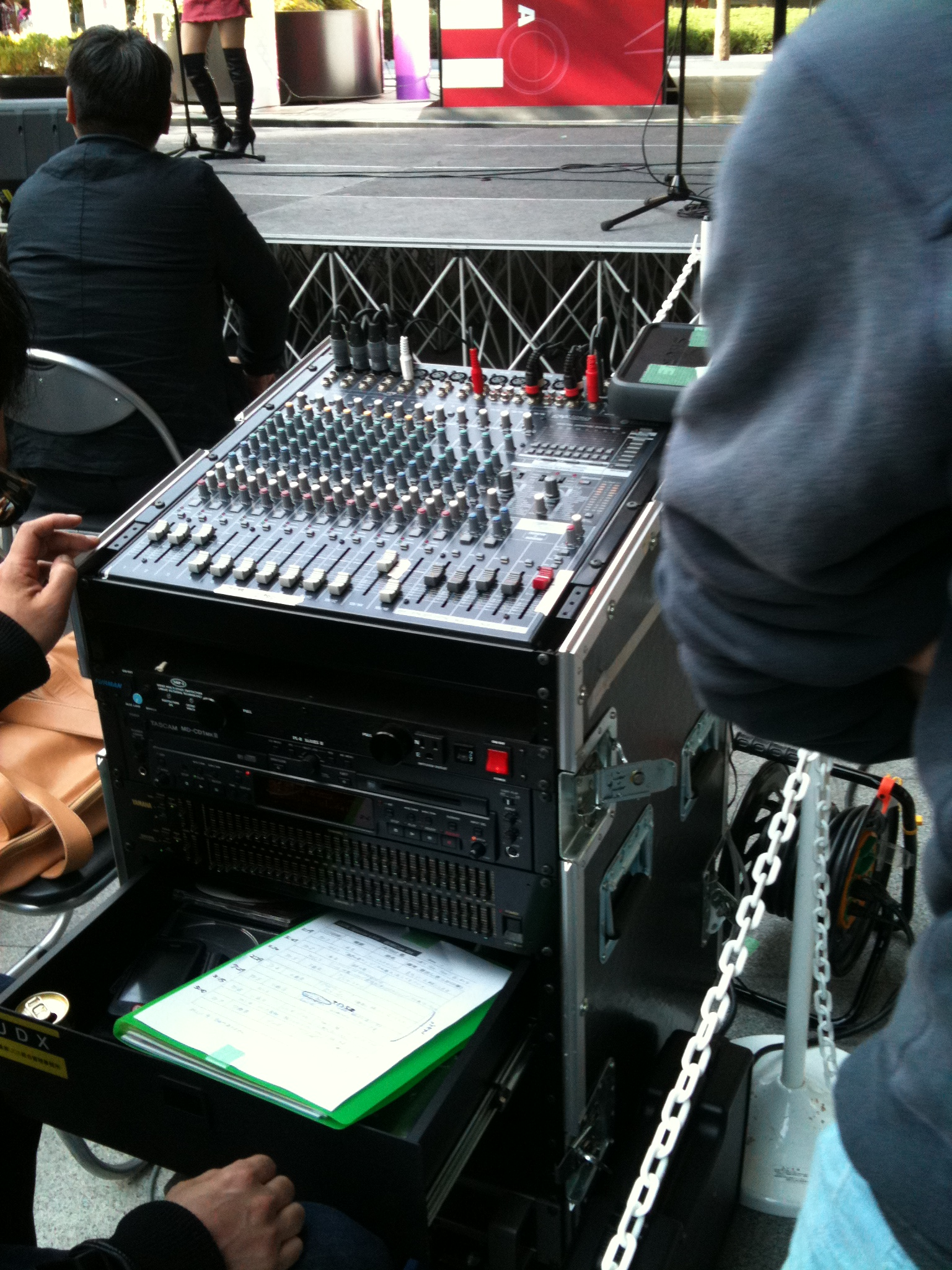
EMX5016CF

EM series

- EM-80
- EM-90A
- EM-100II
- EM-120
- EM-150 / EM-150IIB
- EM-200 / EM-200B (8in/8mic/2aux/2out, 2×9band GEQ, output:2×200 W/ch)
- EM-300B

EMX box type

- EMX212S / EMX312SC / EMX512SC (12in/6mic/2out, C = comp, 1×SPX, 2×7band GEQ, output:220/300/500 W/ch)

EMX console type

- EMX5014C (14in/8mic/6comp/2out, 1×SPX, 2×9band GEQ, output:2×500 W@4Ω/ch)
- EMX5016CF (16in/12mic/8comp/2aux/2out, 2×SPX, 2×9band GEQ + FRC, output:2×500 W@4Ω/ch)

==== Outboards ====
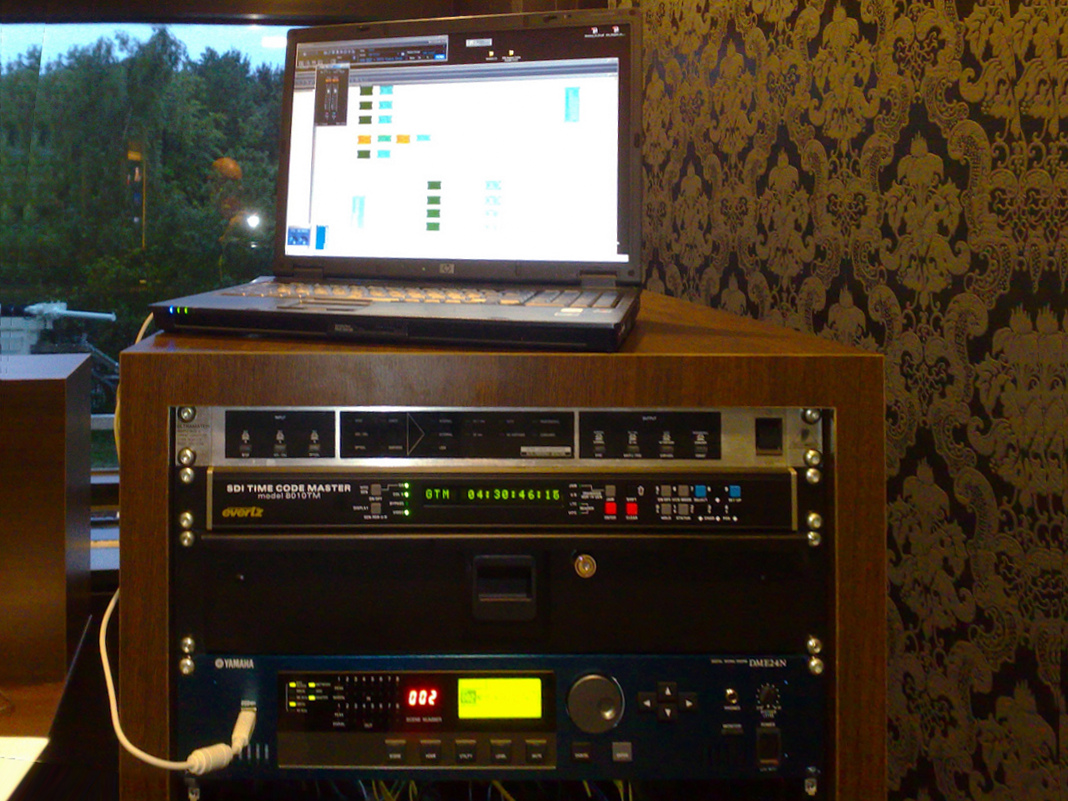
DME24N (bottom) & design software on note PC (top)

DME digital mixing engines

- DME24N / DME64N (digital mixing engine with network audio interface)

REV digital reverberators

- REV1
- REV5
- REV7
- REV100
- REV500
- SREV1 (convolution reverberator)

SPX digital multi effects

- SPX50D
- SPX90
- SPX900
- SPX990
- SPX1000
- SPX2000

Analog outboards

- Q2031A (31band graphic equalizer)

===== Software effect processors =====
Vintage Plug-in Collection
based on Vintage Circuitry Modeling (VCM) technology

- Vintage Channel Strip (2011, EQ & compressors/limiter)
- Vintage Open Deck (2011, tape compression simulator)
- Vintage Stomp Pack (2011, effect stomps)

==== Studio monitors ====
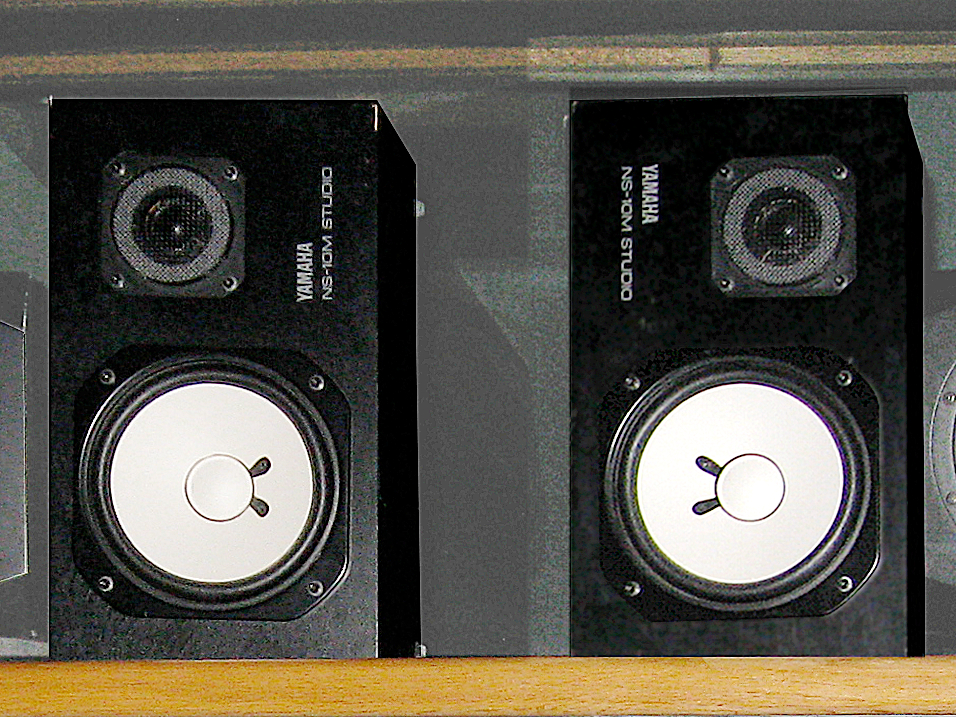
NS-10M Studio

- NS-10M / NS-10M Studio (passive)
- HS10W (sub-woofer)
- HS50M
- HS80M
- MSP3 / MSP3 Studio
- MSP5 / MSP5A / MSP5 Studio
- MSP7 Studio
- MSP10 / MSP10M / MSP10ST / MSP10 Studio
- SW10 / SW10 Studio (sub-woofer)
- HS5 / HS7 / HS8 / HS8s (sub-woofer)
- HS Series (HS3/HS4)

==== Microphones ====
- MZ101

==== Dante equipped I/O boxes ====
- Rio1608-D/Rio3224-D (2012)
- Ri8-D/Ro8-D (2013)
- Tio1608-D (2016)
- Rio1608-D2/Rio3224-D2 (2018)
- Tio1608-D2 (2023)
- Rio1608-D3/Rio3224-D3 (2025)
- RUio1608SB-D/RUio0804-D/RUio16FLX-D (2026)

=== Home audio ===
| CDX-580 CD player; DVD-S1700 DVD player; KX-680 Cassette deck; AX900 Pre/main amplifier; TX930 Tuner; DSP-100 Digital sound field processor; MX35 2ch/4ch Power amplifier |

Hi-Fi audio components

Hi-Fi audio amplifiers

- AX-500 Stereo amplifier
- AS-500 Stereo amplifier
- AX-550 Stereo amplifier
- AX-700 Stereo amplifier
- AX-900 Pre/main amplifier
- MX-35 2ch/4ch power amplifier
- M-4 2ch/4ch power amplifier

Hi-Fi CD players

- CDX-560
- CDX-580

Hi-Fi DVD players

- DVD-S30
- DVD-S80
- DVD-S510
- DVD-S520
- DVD-S530
- DVD-S540
- DVD-S550
- DVD-S557
- DVD-S559
- DVD-S657
- DVD-S659
- DVD-S661
- DVD-S663
- DVD-S700
- DVD-S705
- DVD-S795
- DVD-S796
- DVD-S830
- DVD-S840
- DVD-S1200
- DVD-S1500
- DVD-S1700
- DVD-S1800
- DVD-S2300
- DVD-S2500
- DVD-S2700

Hi-Fi cassette decks

- KX-380
- KX-680

Hi-Fi minidisc decks

- MDX-9
- MDX-595
- MDX-596
- MDX-793
- MDX-E300
- MDX-M5

Hi-Fi turntables

- TT-200
- TT-300
- TT-300U
- TT-S303
- TT-400
- TT-400U
- TT-500
- TT-500U

Hi-Fi tuners

- TX-930

Hi-Fi receivers

- RX-10
- RX-330
- RX-350
- RX-360
- RX-385
- RX-395
- RX-396
- RX-397
- RX-450
- RX-460
- RX-485
- RX-495
- RX-496
- RX-500
- RX-530
- RX-550
- RX-570
- RX-595
- RX-700
- RX-730
- RX-750
- RX-770
- RX-777
- RX-797
- RX-830
- RX-900
- RX-930
- RX-A2A
- RX-A4A
- RX-A6A
- RX-A8A
- RX-A550
- RX-A660
- RX-A670
- RX-A680
- RX-A700
- RX-A710
- RX-A720
- RX-A730
- RX-A740
- RX-A750
- RX-A760
- RX-A770
- RX-A780
- RX-A800
- RX-A810
- RX-A820
- RX-A830
- RX-A840
- RX-A850
- RX-A860
- RX-A870
- RX-A1000
- RX-A1010
- RX-A1020
- RX-A1030
- RX-A1040
- RX-A1050
- RX-A1060
- RX-A1070
- RX-A1080
- RX-A2000
- RX-A2010
- RX-A2020
- RX-A2030
- RX-A2040
- RX-A2050
- RX-A2060
- RX-A2070
- RX-A2080
- RX-A3000
- RX-A3010
- RX-A3020
- RX-A3030
- RX-A3040
- RX-A3050
- RX-A3060
- RX-A3070
- RX-A3080
- RX-E100
- RX-E200
- RX-E410
- RX-E600
- RX-E810
- RX-S70
- RX-S600
- RX-S601
- CR-220
- CR-400
- CR-420
- CR-440
- CR-450
- CR-600
- CR-620
- CR-640
- CR-800
- CR-820
- CR-840
- CR-1000
- CR-1020
- CR-1040

Hi-Fi equalizers

- GE-3
- GE-5
- GE-20
- GE-30
- GE-40
- GE-60
- EQ-32
- EQ-50
- EQ-70
- EQ-500
- EQ-550
- EQ-630
- GQ-1031
- GQ-2015
- GQ-2031
- Q-2031

Hi-Fi VCD changers

- VCD-100K
- VCD-120K

28 Series

- A-28 amplifier
- K-28 cassette deck
- T-28 tuner
- P-28 turntable
Sound processors

- DSP-1 Digital Soundfield Processor (1985)
- DSP-100 Digital Soundfield Processor
- DSP-E492 Natural Sound AV Processor Amplifier (1997–99)
- Natural Sound

Hi-Fi audio speakers

NS series

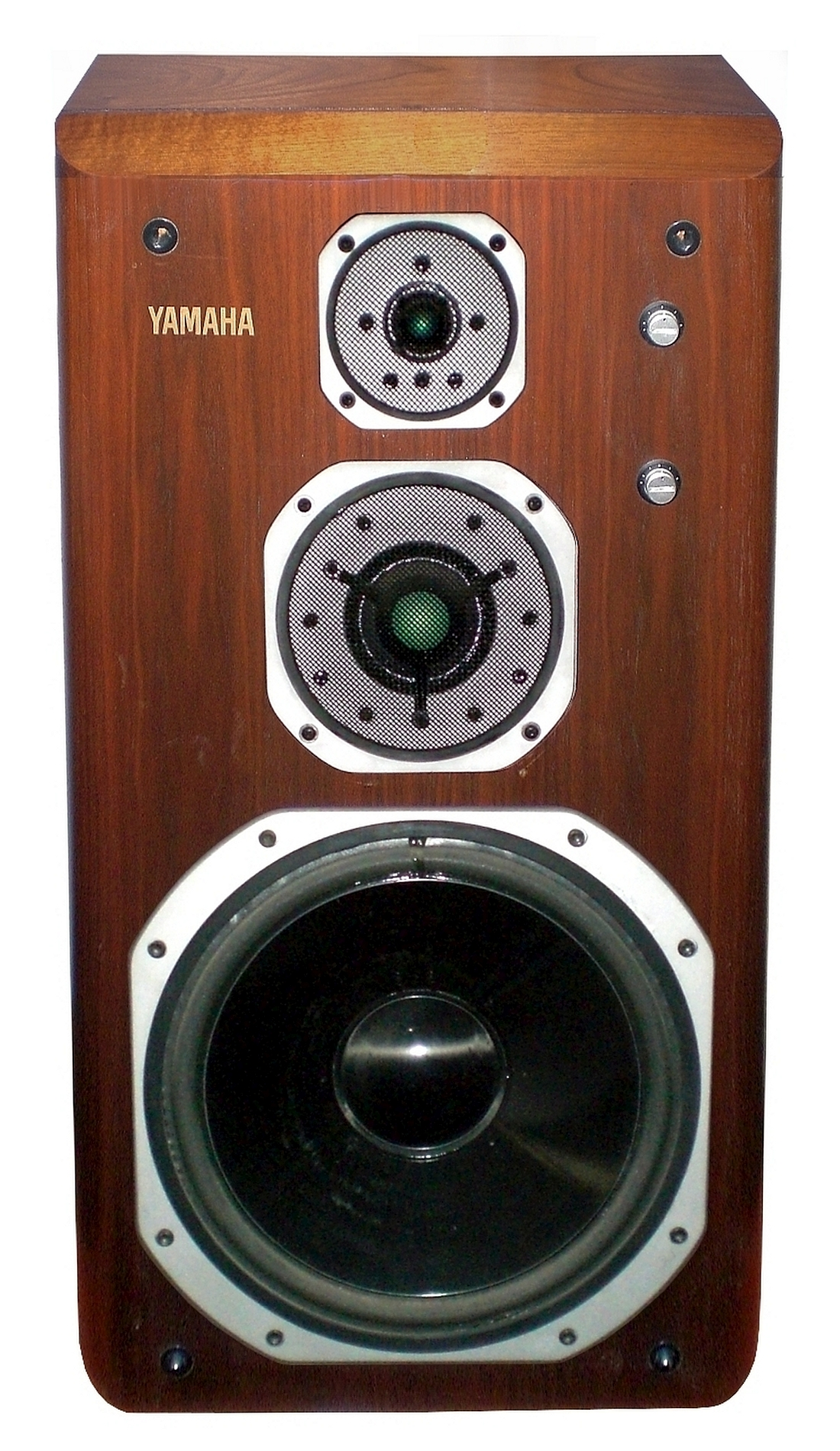
1982, the company presented the NS-2000 loudspeaker box as their new top model incorporating new technologies like a subwoofer with a membrane from carbon fiber.

- NS-1
- NS-5X
- NS-10
- NS-044
- NS-200
- NS-333
- NS-344
- NS-500
- NS-A100
- NS-625
- NS-700x
- NS-1000
- NS-1000M
- NS-1000x
- NS-1000xw
- NS-2000
- NSX-10000
- Soavo series

YSP series

- YSP-1
- YSP-800
- YSP-900
- YSP-1000
- YSP-1100
- YSP-1400
- YSP-1600
- YSP-2200
- YSP-2500
- YSP-2700
- YSP-3000
- YSP-3300
- YSP-4000
- YSP-4100
- YSP-4300
- YSP-5100
- YSP-5600

== Electronics products ==
=== Home computers ===
- YIS PU-I-20 / PU-I-10 (1981, CPU:YM6502+Z8000, Mem:128kB, Graphic:Vector graphics, 512x384@3bit, 12bit color palette)

MSX/MSX2

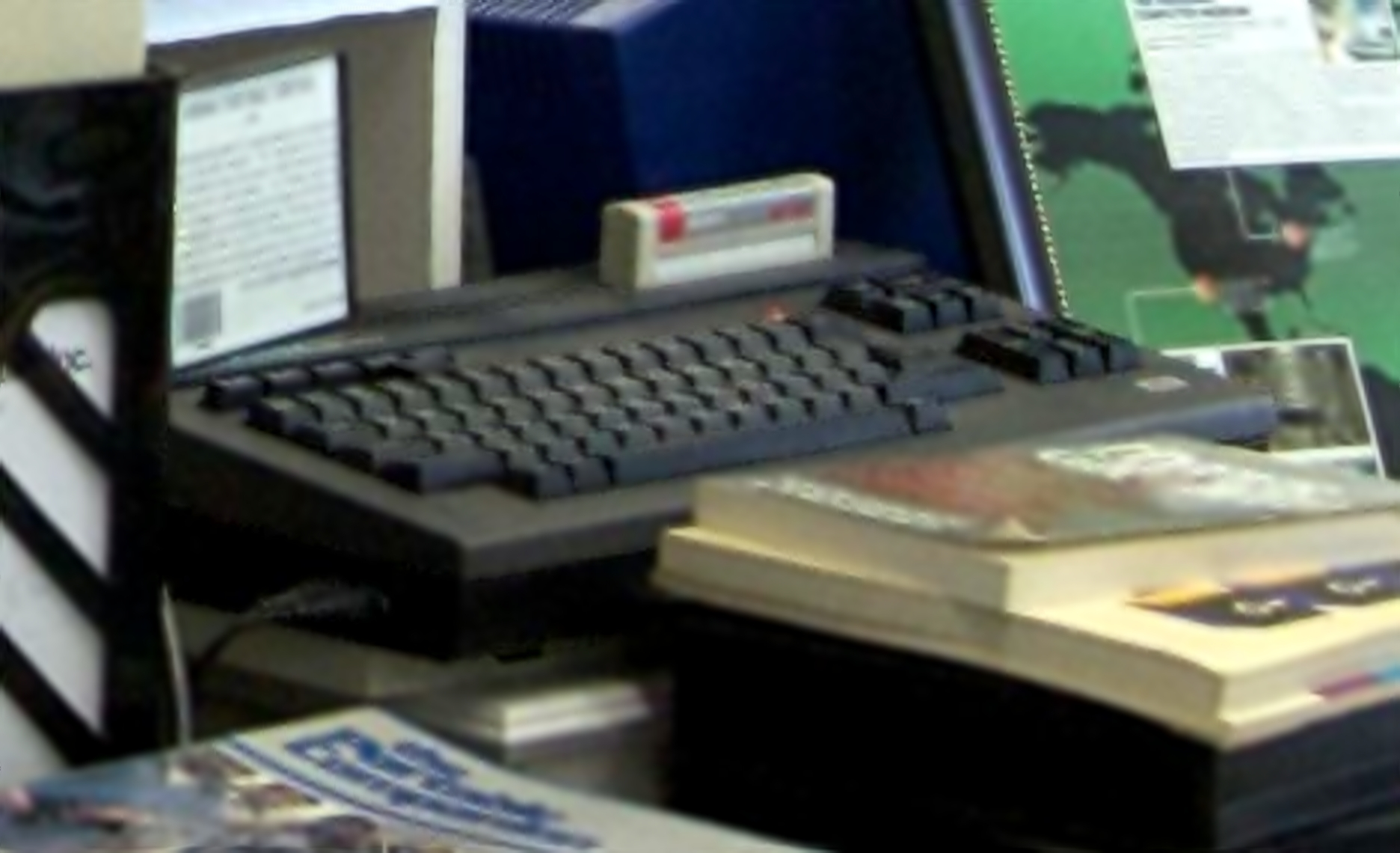
CX5M MSX Music Computer

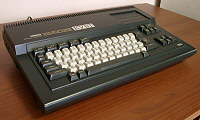
YIS503II MSX Personal Computer

- AX-350 / AX-350II
- AX-500
- CX5 / CX5F / CX5M / CX5MII / CX5MII/128 — MSX computers
- CX7/128 / CX7M / CX7M/128 — MSX2 computers
- CX-11
- CX-100
- SX-100
- YIS-303
- YIS-503 / YIS-503II / YIS-503IIR / YIS-503II/64 / YIS-503IIIR / YIS-503IIIR/128 — MSX computers, base model of CX5M
- YIS-513
- YIS-603B
- YIS-604 / YIS-604/128
- YIS-805 / YIS-805/128 / YIS-805/256

=== Optical disc drives ===
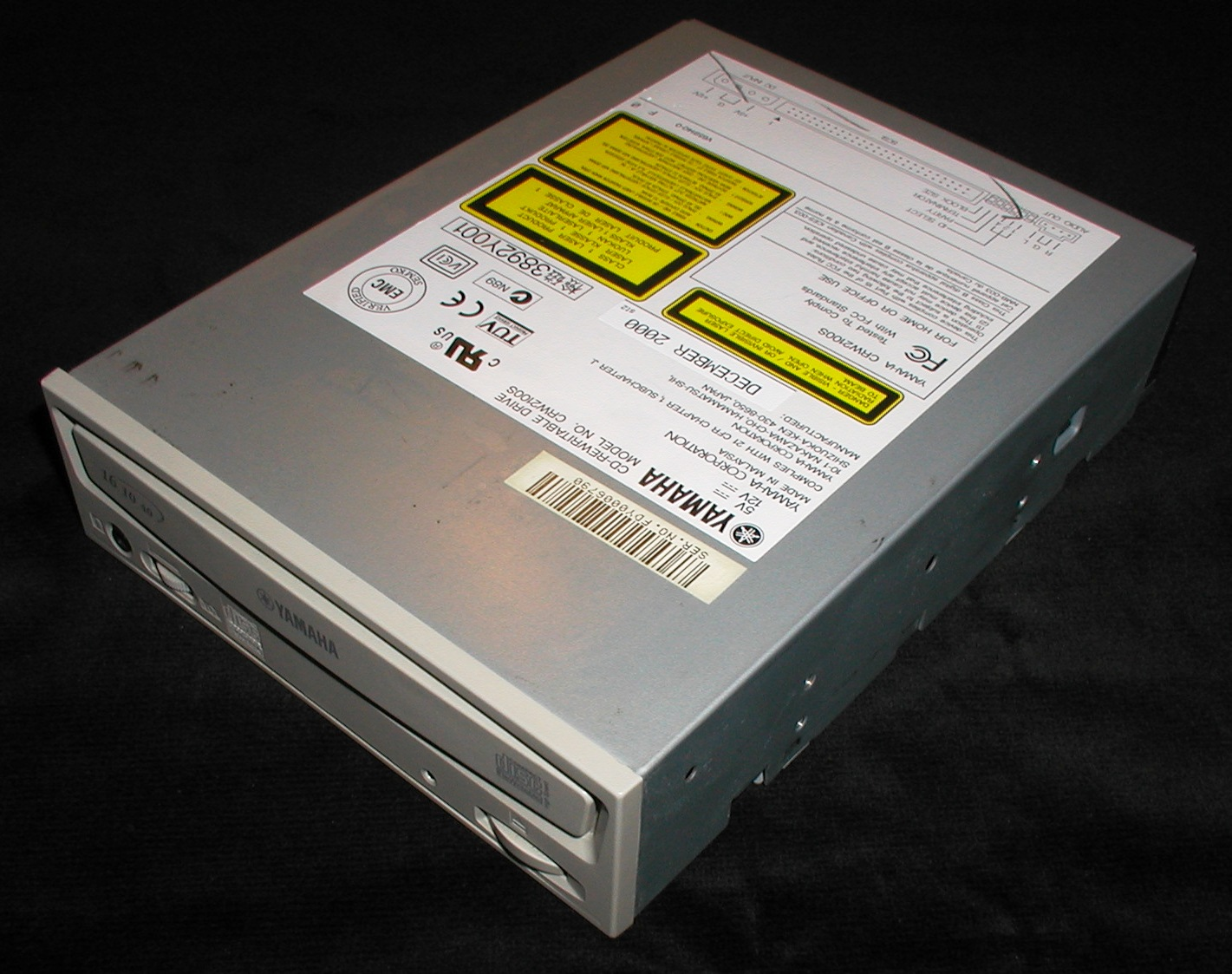
CRW2100S

=== Networking hardware ===
- Routers
- Switches
- Firewalls
- Software for Networking Products

== Semiconductors ==
=== Sound chips ===
- SCSP — used on the Sega Saturn console and Model 2, Model 3 and ST-V arcade systems
- Yamaha Super Intelligent Sound Processor (AICA) — used on Sega's Dreamcast game console and NAOMI arcade systems

PSG/SSG

- YM2149 / YM3439 / YMZ294 / YMZ284 / YMZ285 (SSG)
  — PSG variants, adopted by MSX2 (1985) standard.

OPL

- YM3526 (OPL)
- YM2413 (OPLL) — MSX-Music chip, adopted by MSX2+ (1988) & MSX TurboR (1990) standards.
- Y8950 — MSX-Audio chip, used on some MSX (1983) modules.
- YM3812 (OPL2) — used on 1st & 2nd generation Sound Blaster cards for FM sound.
- YMF262 (OPL3) — used on 3rd & 4th generation Sound Blaster cards for FM sound.
- YMF289 (OPL3-L) — low power variant of YMF262, used on some sound cards.
- YMF278 (OPL4) — used in MoonSound for MSX (1994)

OPN

- YM2203 (OPN) — used on arcade systems and on NEC's PC-88/98 computer series.
- YM2608 (OPNA) — used on NEC's PC-88/98 computer series.
- YM2610 (OPNB) — used on Neo Geo console.
- YM2612 (OPN2) — used in Sega's Mega Drive/Genesis game console and Fujitsu's FM Towns computer series.
- YM3438 (OPN2C) — used in Sega's System C-2, a coin-op arcade system based on the Mega Drive, and the System 32.
- YMF288 (OPN3-L) — used on later models of NEC's PC-88/98 computer series.
- YMF297 (OPN4) — OPN3/OPL3

OPS

- YM2128 (OPS) — used on the DX1 / DX5 / DX7 / DX9 alongside the EGS
- YM2129 (EGS)

Misc

- YM2151 (OPM) — used on arcade systems and on SFG-01 FM Sound Synthesizer Unit for CX5M
- YM2164 (OPP) — used on DX21 / DX27 / DX100 / SFG-05 / FB-01, and Korg DS-8 / Korg 707
- YM3806 (OPQ) — used on Porta Tone PSR-70
- YM3420 (OPU)
- YMF271 (OPX)
- YM2414 (OPZ) — used on DX11 / TX81Z, Korg Z3 guitar synthesizer
- YM2424 (OPZII) — used on V50, a pair of them for 16 note polyphony
- YM2154 (RYP4) — used on Porta Tone PSR-60, PSR-70 and PSR-80.
- YM3301 (RYP6)
- YM2142 (GE8)
- YM2163 (DSG)
- YMU757 (MA-1)
- YMU759 (MA-2)
- YMU762 (MA-3)
- YMU765 (MA-5)
- YMU786 (MA-7) — a mobile phone sound chip with 3D audio effect, etc.
- YMF293 — Formant Singing sound chip used for PLG100-SG.
- YMF7xx series (DS-1) — PC audio chip
  - YMF70x~YMF719 — for ISA bus card
  - YMF720~... — for PCI bus card
  - YMF7x0 series — for on-board or embedded solutions
  - YMF7x4 series — for PCI bus standalone adapter
    it supported Yamaha XG level 1, some of MU50 additions, DB50XG compatibilities, Roland GS in TG300B mode, OPL3 FM synthesizer, some emulation of Sound Blaster Pro (stereo 8-bit at 22 kHz) and MPU-401 (MIDI interface).
    - YMF724 — 2ch output
    - YMF744 — 4ch output
    - YMF754 — 5.1/6ch output
- YMP706 — Formant Shaping / FM Synthesis used for Yamaha FS1R and PLG100-DX.
- YMZ263 (MMA)
- YMZ280B (PCMD8)
- YMZ705 (SSGS)
- YMZ732 (SSGS2)
- YMZ733 (SSGS3)
- YMZ735 (FMS)
- YMZ771 (SSG3)
- YMZ774

AudioEngine series

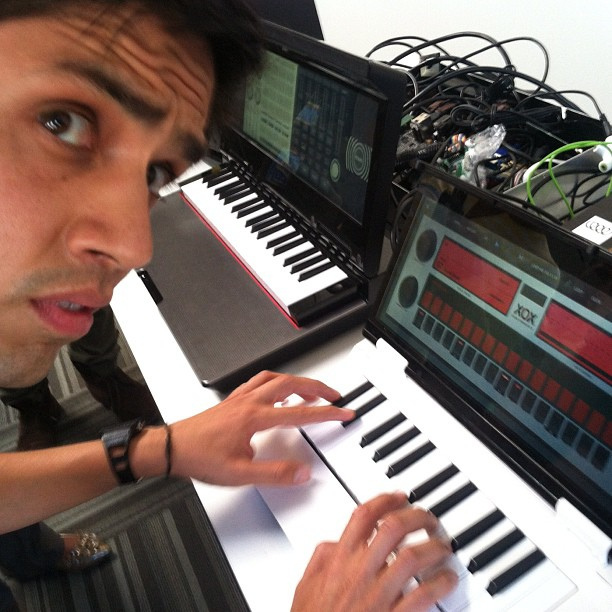
Miselu neiro (2012), a prototype of Android-based music making device featuring NSX-1 chip

- YMW820 (NSX-1) (2013) — AudioEngine series sound chip integrating: General MIDI sound with Yamaha XG effects, and either Real Acoustic Sound (RAS) or eVocaloid.

DAC

- YM3012 (DAC-MS) — used with YM2151 (OPM), etc..
- YM3014 (DAC-SS) — used with YM2151 (OPM), YM2203 (OPN), YM3526 (OPL), etc..
- YM3016 (DAC-GD) — used with YM2608 (OPNA), YM2610 (OPNB)
- YAC513 (DAC) — used with YMF262 (OPL3), YMF278 (OPL4), etc..

=== Video chips ===
- YM2217 — used in SG-1000 II
- YM2220 — used in some MSX machines.
- V9938 — MSX-Video chip, adopted by MSX2 (1985) standard.
- V9958 — MSX-Video chip, adopted by MSX2+ & MSX TurboR standards.
- V9990 — used in Graphics9000 extension for MSX (1994)
- YM2602 — used in Sega Master System (1985)
- YM7101 — used in Sega Genesis (1988)
- FH3006 — used in Sega Saturn (1994)

=== MSX peripheral chips ===
MSX-Engine

- S1985 — MSX-SYSTEM II chip, for MSX2 System LSI.
- S3527 — MSX-SYSTEM chip, for MSX System LSI.

== Sports equipment ==
=== Archery ===
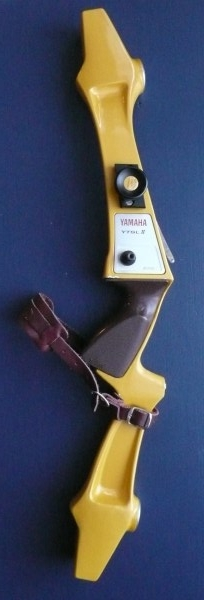
YAMAHA YTSL II Archery Raiser

- YB
- YTS II
- YTD
- YTSL
- YTSL II
- YTD II
- EX
- Alpha DX
- Alpha SX
- Alpha EX
- Eolla
- Superfeel Forged 1
- Superfeel Forged 2

=== Snow ski ===
- 1970s All-Round

== See also ==
- Yamaha Corporation
- Yamaha electric guitar models
- List of Yamaha signature instruments
- EWI (musical instrument)
- Lyricon

== Footnotes ==
Notes

Media

== Bibliography ==
current models

- "Products". Yamaha Corporation of America.
- "Yamaha Commercial Audio Systems & NEXO".

historical models

- "History of the Yamaha Group" (PDF). IR publications. Yamaha Corporation. 2010.
- "Development of Yamaha Products", Corporate Information (chronology), Yamaha Corporation
- "Grand piano products chronology" (in Japanese). Yamaha Corporation. Archived from the original on 2 September 2017.
- "Upright piano products chronology" (in Japanese). Yamaha Corporation. Archived from the original on 6 July 2017.
- "History of Electone - Electone 50th Anniversary in 2009" (in Japanese). Yamaha Corporation. 2009. Archived from the original on 27 May 2011.
- ピアノ/キーボード:製品アーカイブ検索 [Piano/Keyboard: archived products (searched result)] (in Japanese). Yamaha Corporation. Archived from the original on 21 July 2011.
- "History of Products - Yamaha Electronic Musical Instruments". Yamaha Corporation. Archived from the original on 15 December 2009.
- "History of Products - Yamaha Professional Audio". Yamaha Corporation. Archived from the original on 15 May 2011.
- "GuitArchive". Yamaha Corporation of America.
- "Discontinued Guitar Model DB" (in Japanese). Yamaha Corporation. Archived from the original on 4 April 2011.

acoustic guitar catalogs

- "Yamaha Guitars & Amplifiers catalog 1968". 8 January 2011.
- "Yamaha Folk Guitar catalog 1969 (Red label 1)" (in Japanese).
- "Yamaha Folk Guitar catalog 1969 (Red label 2)" (in Japanese).
- "Yamaha Folk Guitar catalog 1972 (Green label 1)" (in Japanese).
- "Yamaha Folk Guitar catalog 1972 (Green label 2)" (in Japanese).
- "Yamaha Folk Guitar catalog 1974 (Black label)" (in Japanese).
- "Yamaha Folk Guitar catalog 1974 (L-31/FG-1200S/FG-1200SN)" (in Japanese).
- "Yamaha Folk Guitar catalog 1976" (in Japanese).
- "Yamaha Folk Guitar catalog 1978" (in Japanese).
- "Yamaha Folk Guitar catalog 1978 (Custom/Order made)" (in Japanese).
- "Yamaha Folk Guitar catalog 1980" (in Japanese).
- "Yamaha Folk Guitar catalog 1980 (Electric Folk)" (in Japanese).
- "Yamaha Folk Guitar catalog 1981" (in Japanese).
- "Yamaha Folk Guitar catalog 1981 (FG series)" (in Japanese).
- "Yamaha Folk Guitar catalog 1981 (Electric Folk)" (in Japanese).
- "Yamaha Folk Guitar catalog 1982 (XS Limited)" (in Japanese).
- "Yamaha Folk Guitar catalog 1984" (in Japanese).

electric guitar catalogs

- "Yamaha Guitar catalogs (1966–2004)". archived by VintAxe.com Vintage Guitars (password required)
- "Yamaha Guitars & Amplifiers catalog 1968". 8 January 2011.
- "Yamaha Electric Guitar catalog 1980" (in Japanese).
- "Yamaha Electric Guitar catalog 1981" (in Japanese).
- "Yamaha Electric Guitar catalog 1982" (in Japanese).
- "Yamaha Electric Guitar catalog 1985" (in Japanese).
- "Yamaha New Commer catalog 1985 Winter (guitar pages)" (in Japanese).
- "Yamaha Effects catalog 1980" (in Japanese).

keyboard catalogs

- "Yamaha Keyboard catalog 1978" (in Japanese).
- "Yamaha Keyboard catalog 1979" (in Japanese).
- "Yamaha Keyboard catalog 1980" (in Japanese).
- "Yamaha Keyboard catalog 1985" (in Japanese).
- "Yamaha DX100/DX27 catalog 1985" (in Japanese).
- "Yamaha New Commer catalog 1985 Winter (keyboard pages)" (in Japanese).
