= List of MSX computers =

This is a list of MSX computers, separated by MSX, MSX2, MSX2+ and MSX TurboR compatibility, and by manufacturer.

== MSX ==
- Al Alamia: Sakhr AX100, Sakhr AX170
- Canon: V8, V10, V20
- Casio: MX-10, PV-7, PV-16, MX-10, MX-101
- Daewoo/Yeno: CPC-300, IQ-1000 DPC-100, IQ-1000 DPC-180, IQ-1000 DPC-200, DPC-200, Zemmix, Zemmix V
- Dragon Data: Dragon MSX
- Fujitsu: FM-X
- GoldStar: FC-80/FC-80U,GFC-1080/GFC-1080AFC-200
- Gradiente: Expert, Expert DD Plus, Expert Plus
- Hitachi: MB-H1, MB-H2, MB-H21, MB-H25, MB-H50
- JVC: HC-7GB, HG-60
- Mitsubishi: ML-61, ML-F48, ML-F80, ML-F110, ML-G10, ML-8000
- National: CF-2000, CF-1200, CF-2700, CF-3000, CF-3300, FS-4000, FS-1300
- Panasonic: CF-2000, CF-2700
- Philips: VG-8000, VG-8010, VG 8020
- Pioneer: PX-7
- Sanyo: MPC-100, Wavy 10
- Samsung/Fenner: SPC-800
- Sharp/Epcom: Hotbit
- Sony: HB-10, HB-10P, HB-10D, HB-11, HB-20P, HB-55, HB-55P, HB-75, HB-75D, HB-75P, HB-101, HB-101P, HB-201, HB-201P, HB-501P, HB-701, HB-701FD, HB-8000 Hotbit 1.1, HB-8000 Hotbit 1.2
- Spectravideo: SV-728, SV-738
- Talent: DPC-200
- Toshiba: HX-10S, HX-10, HX-10DP, HX-20, HX-21, HX-22, HX-32, HX-51
- Yamaha: CX5M, CX-5, YJS 503, YJS 503II, YJS 503IIR, YJS 604/128, CXS-II/128, AX-150, AX-170
- Yashica-Kyocera: YC 64

== MSX2 ==
- Canon: V25, V30, V35
- Daewoo/Yeno: IQ-2000 CPC-300, IQ-2000 CPC-300E, X-II CPC-400, X-II CPC-400S, Zemmix Super V
- Hitachi: MB-H3, HC-21
- JVC: HC 180, HC 90, HC 95
- National: FS-5500F1/F2, FS-4500, FS-4700, FS-5000F2, FS-4600
- Mitsubishi: MLG 10, MLG 30, ML-TS2H, ML-F120
- Panasonic: FS-A1, FS-A1MK2, FS-A1F, FS-A1FM
- Philips: VG-8220, VG-8230, VG-8235, VG-8240, NMS 8220, NMS 8245, NMS 8250, NMS 8255, NMS 8280
- Samsung
- Sanyo: AX 370, Wavy 2, Wavy 23
- Sony: HB-F1, HB-F1II, HB-F1XD, HB-F1XDMK2, HB-F5, HB-F500, HB-F500P, HB-F700D, HB-F700P, HB-F700S, HB-F900, HB-F9P, HB-G900P, HB-T600, HB-T7
- Spectravideo: SV-838
- Talent: TPC-310, TPC-311, TPC-312, DPC-300
- Toshiba: HX-23, HX-33, HX-34
- Yamaha: AX 350, AX 500, YIS-503IIIR, YIS-805/128R2

== MSX2+ ==
- DDX
- Daewoo: Zemmix Turbo
- Panasonic: FS-A1FX, FS-A1WX, FS-A1WSX
- Sony: HB-F1XDJ, HB-F1XV
- Sanyo: WAVY PHC-70FD, WAVY PHC-70FD2, WAVY PHC-35J

== MSX TurboR ==
- Panasonic: FS-A1ST, FS-A1GT
