= Philips Computers =

Subsidiary of the company Philips

Philips Telecommunicatie en Informatie Systemen (Philips Computers) was a subsidiary of Philips that designed and manufactured personal computers. Philips Computers was active from 1963 through 1992. Before that, Philips produced three computers between 1953 and 1956, all for internal use, PETER, STEVIN, and PASCAL.

Philips Computers was mostly known for its pioneer work in optical devices (through a separate subsidiary: LMSI). Philips computers were also sold under the Magnavox brand in North America. Two instances of Philips Computers products sold under other brands are known to date.

Philips computers were coupled with Philips monitors. Philips had far more success selling its monitors than its computers. Philips monitors continue being designed, produced and sold globally contemporaneously. Philips also had and has moderate success selling peripherals such as mice, keyboards and optical devices. Philips also sold and sells computer media such as diskettes and optical media (CD)s.

Philips also developed the CD-i standard but it flopped. Another experimental product was the Philips :YES, based on Intel's 80186. It also flopped.

Philips PCs were mostly equipped with motherboards designed by Philips Home Electronics in Montreal, Canada.

In the late 1990s Philips Pentium PCs were sold based on generic components and cases. These were not proprietarily designed and produced.

Philips had a subsidiary that sold the PCs under the Vendex brand: HeadStart. These systems were actively marketed in certain markets through Vendex. These systems were on display in the now defunct warehouse chain Vroom & Dreesmann in the Netherlands. Some HeadStart PCs were manufactured in South Korea by Samsung and monitors by Daewoo.

In the 2000s Philips briefly introduced a handheld PC: the Velo.

== Products ==
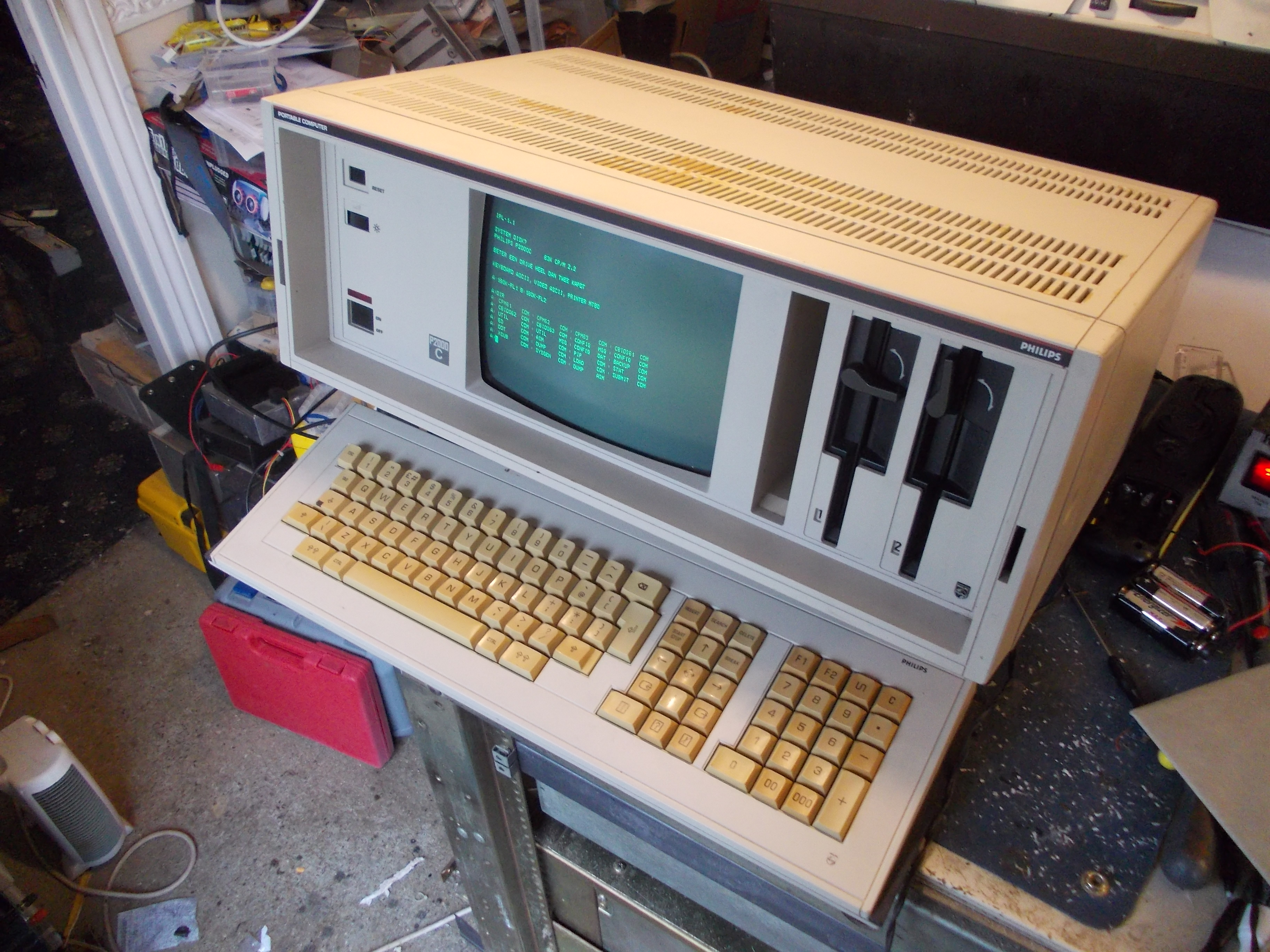
Philips P2000C

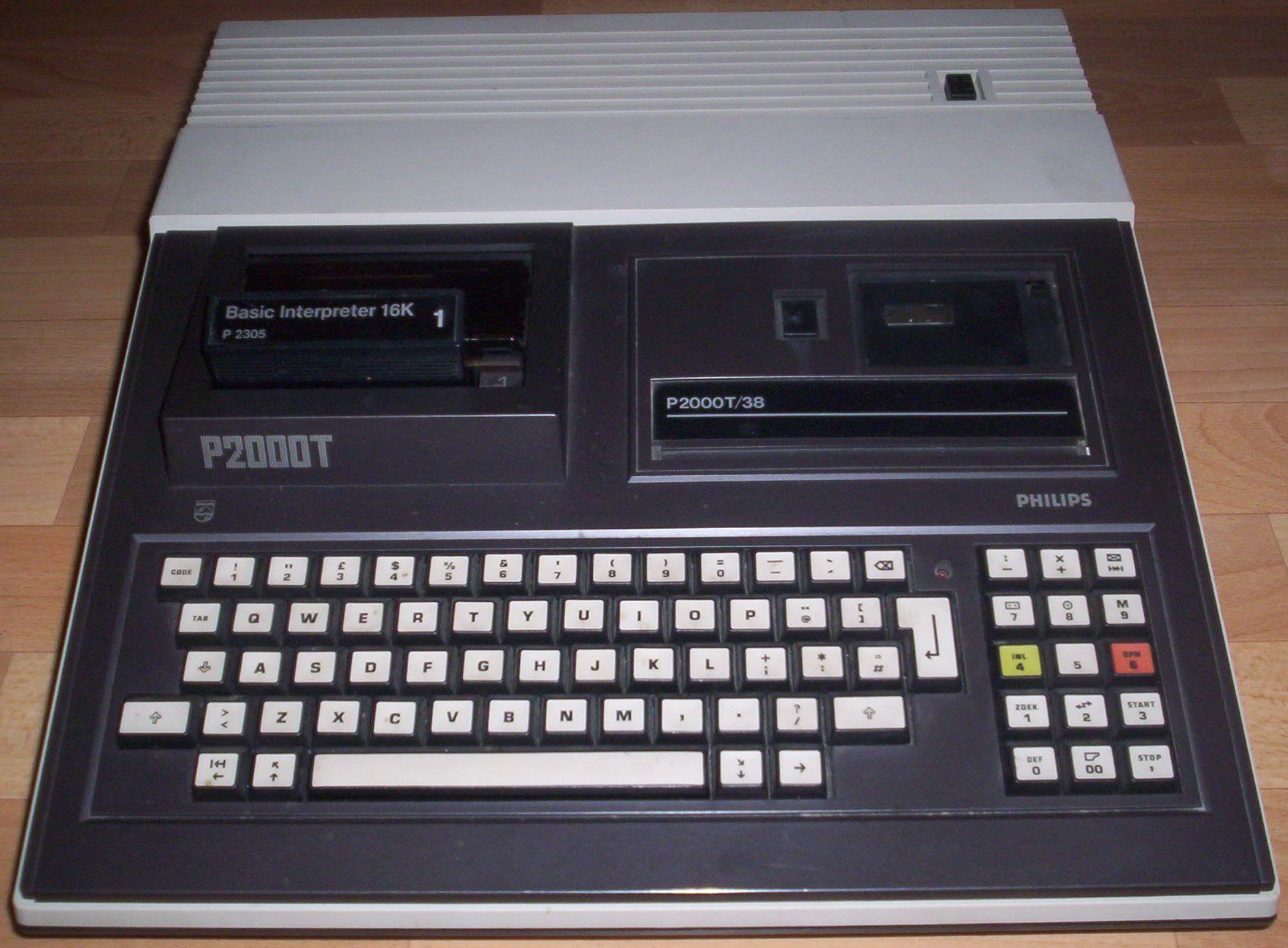
Philips P2000T

P 20 series (Z80 CPU)

- Philips P 2000 C
- Philips P 2000 M
- Philips P 2000 T
- Philips P 2010
- Philips P 2012
- Philips P 2015

P 21 series (8088 CPU)

- Philips P 2120 (desktop) (1990s green design)

P 22 series (286 CPU)

- Philips P 2230 (desktop) (1990s green design)

P 31 series (8088 CPU)

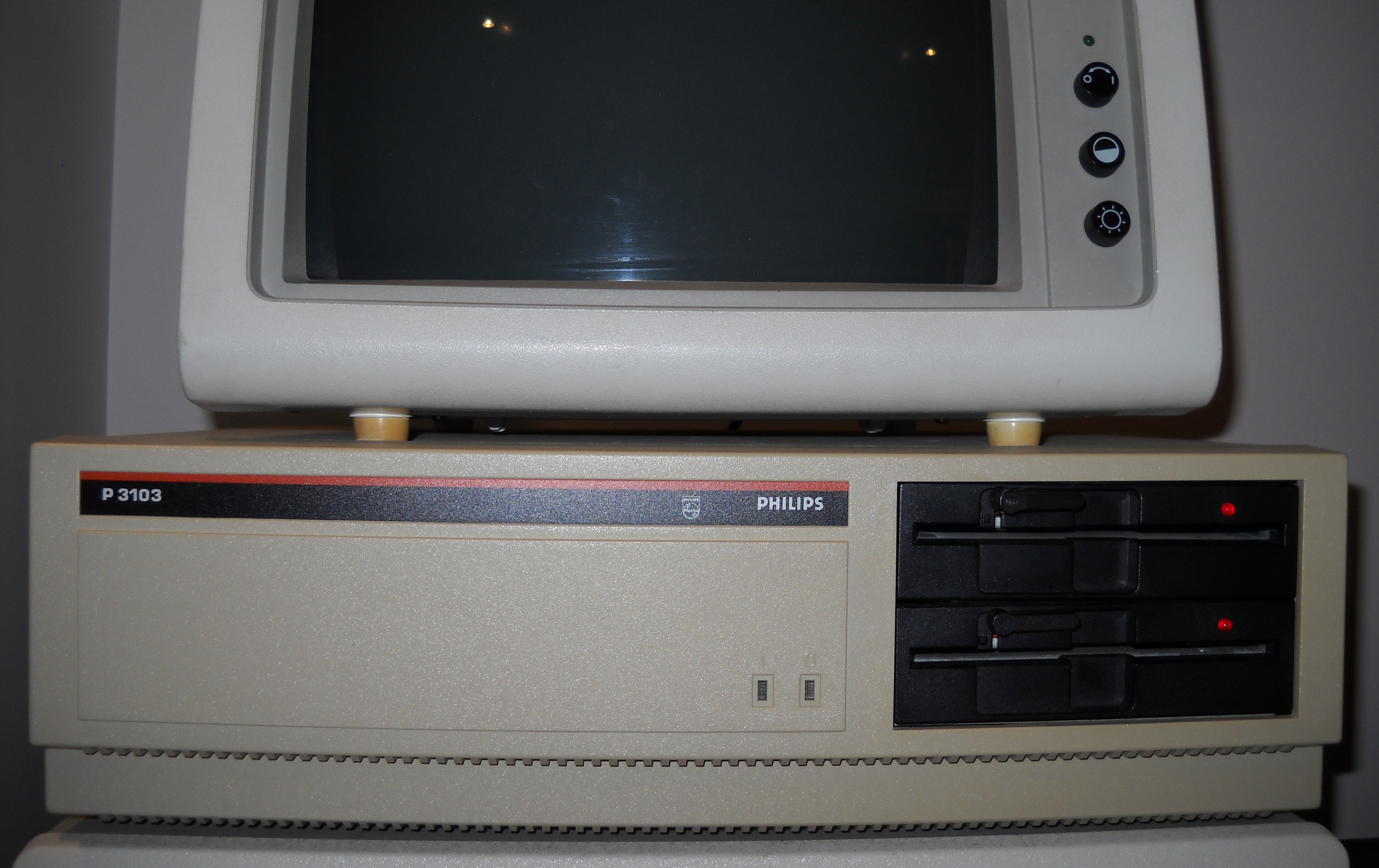
Philips P 3103

- Philips P 3100 (desktop)
- Philips P 3102 (desktop)
- Philips P 3103 (desktop) (1980s red design)
- Philips P 3105 (desktop)
- Philips P 3120 (desktop)

P 32 series (286 CPU)

- Philips P 3202 (desktop) (1980s red design)
- Philips P 3204 (desktop) (1980s red design)
- Philips P 3230 (desktop) (1980s red design)
- Philips P 3238 (desktop) (1990s green design)
- Philips P 3239 (desktop) (1990s futuristic design)

P 33 series (386 CPU)

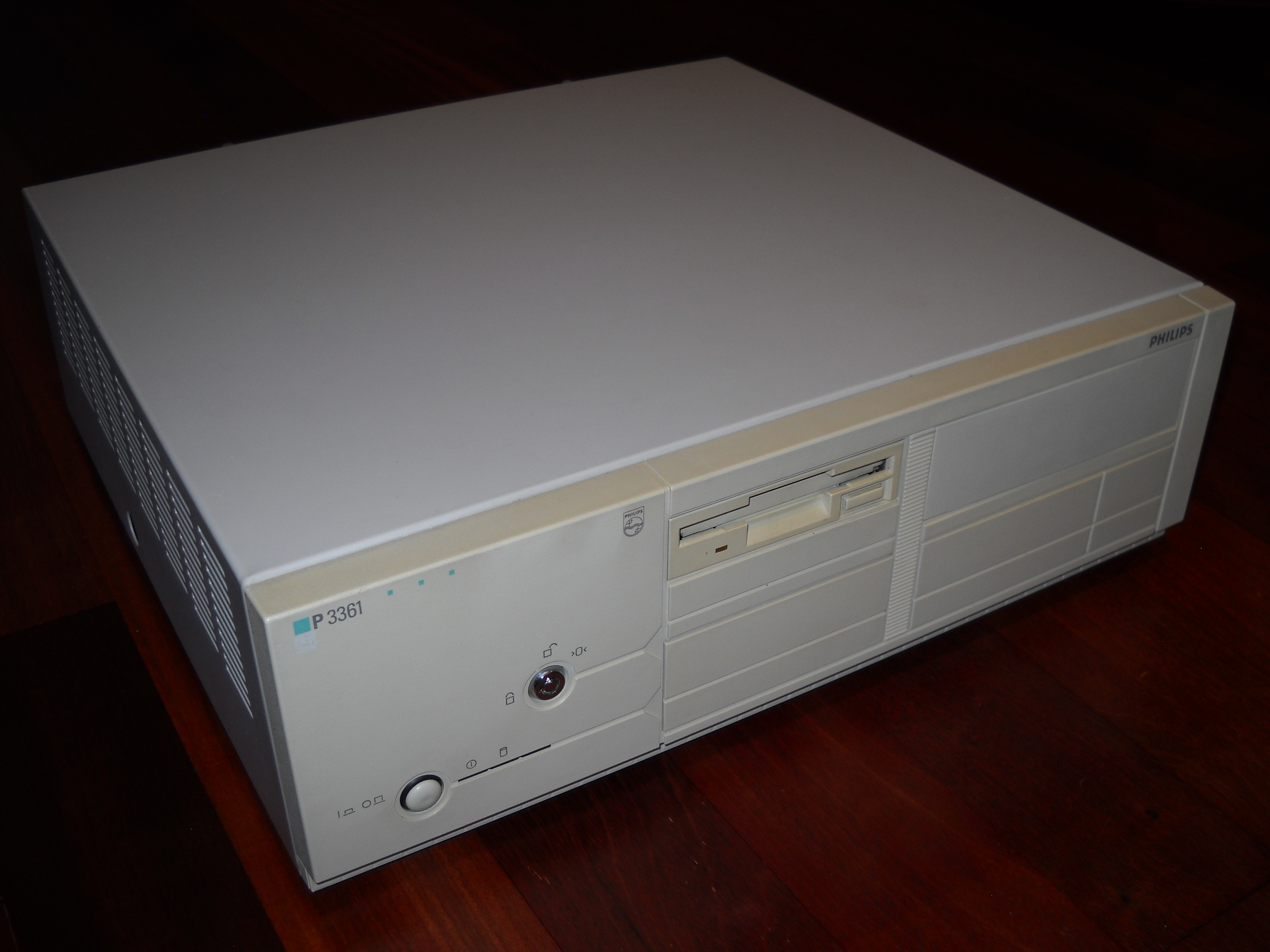
Philips P 3361

- Philips P 3302 (not yet identified)
- Philips P 3345 (desktop) (1990s green design)
- Philips P 3348 (desktop) (1990s green design)
- Philips P 3355 (desktop) (1990s green design)
- Philips P 3360 (desktop) (1990s green design)
- Philips P 3361 (desktop) (1990s green design)
- Philips P 3370 (tower) (1990s green design)
- Philips P 3371 (not yet identified)

P 34 series (486 CPU)

- Philips P 3460 (midi tower) (1990s green design)
- Philips P 3464 (not yet identified)
- Philips P 3470 (not yet identified)
- Philips P 3471 (desktop) (1990s green design)

=== MSX compatible ===
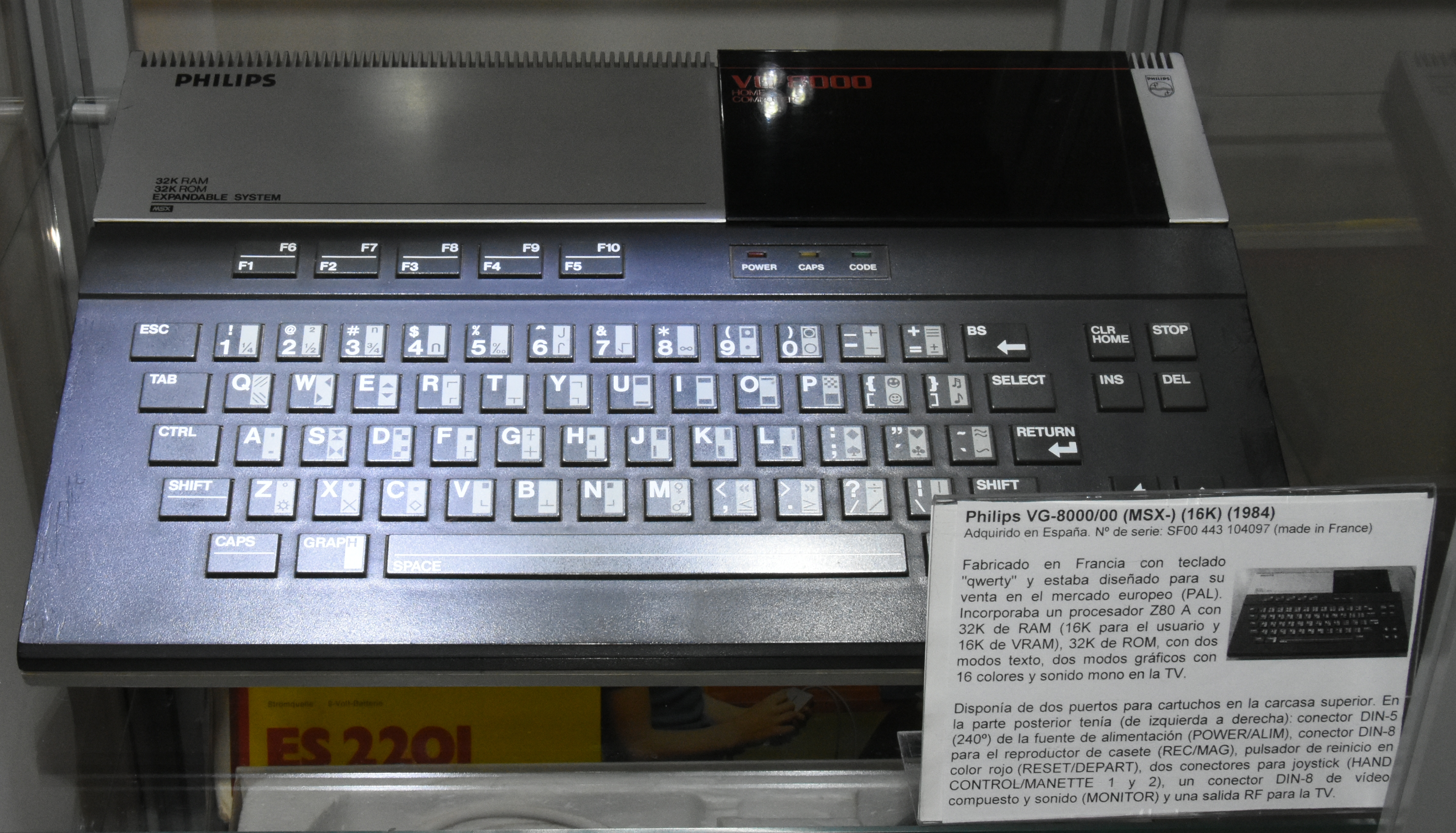
Philips VG-8000

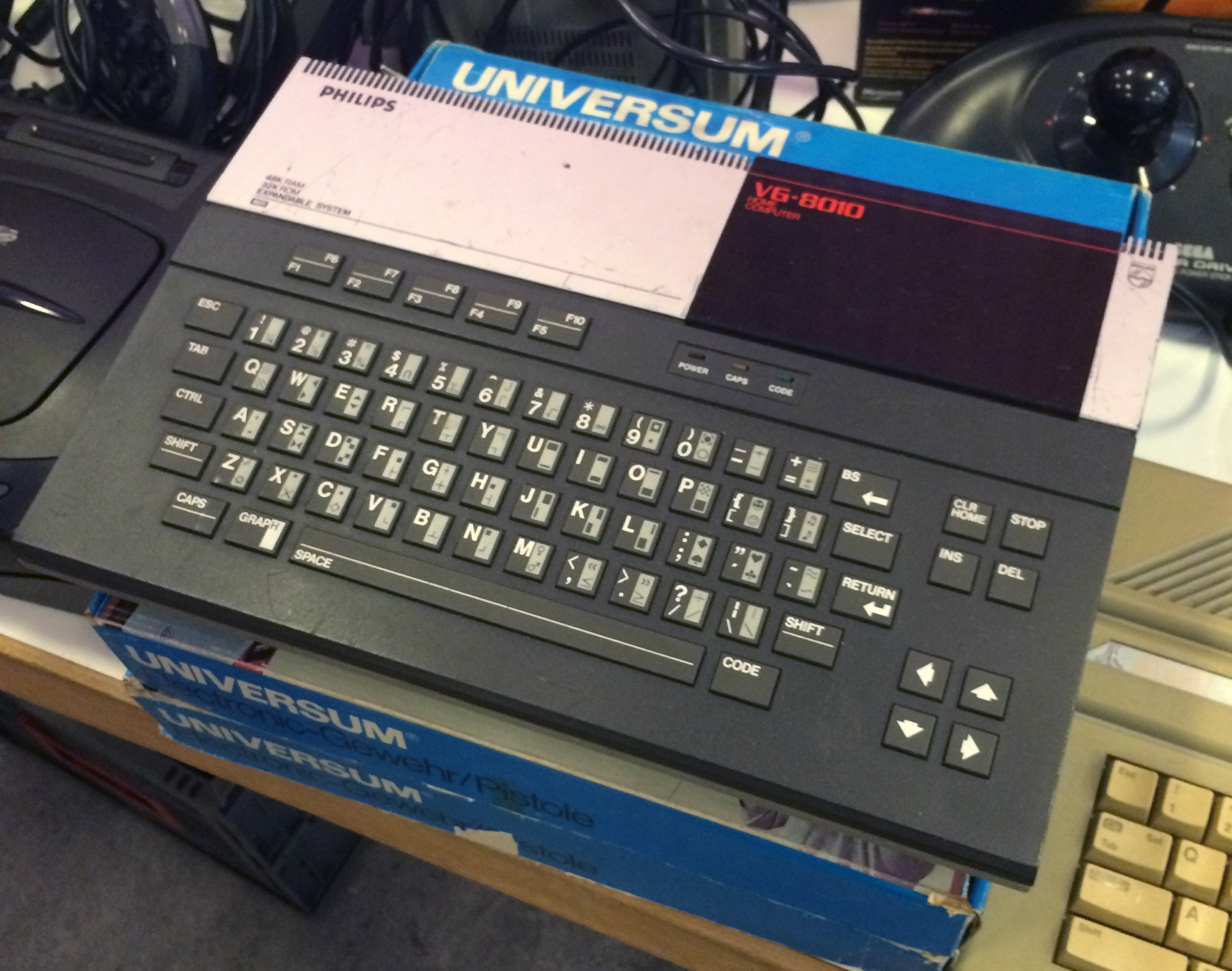
Philips VG-8010

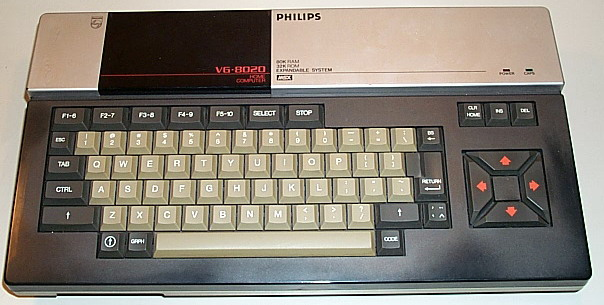
MSX Philips VG-8020

Philips supported the MSX standard, and released many MSX1 and MSX2 computers, with different hardware and expansions like monitors, printers and mice. They also introduced the MSX-AUDIO standard to the MSX with the NMS-1205 Music Module, and video editing with the NMS-8280.

- Philips VG-8000 (1984, Belgium, Germany, Finland)
- Philips VG-8010 (1985, Belgium, Germany, Spain, France, Netherlands)
- Philips VG-8020 (1985, Belgium, Germany, Spain, France, Netherlands)
- Philips NMS 800 (1989, Italy)
- Philips NMS 801 (1989, Italy)

=== MSX2 compatible ===
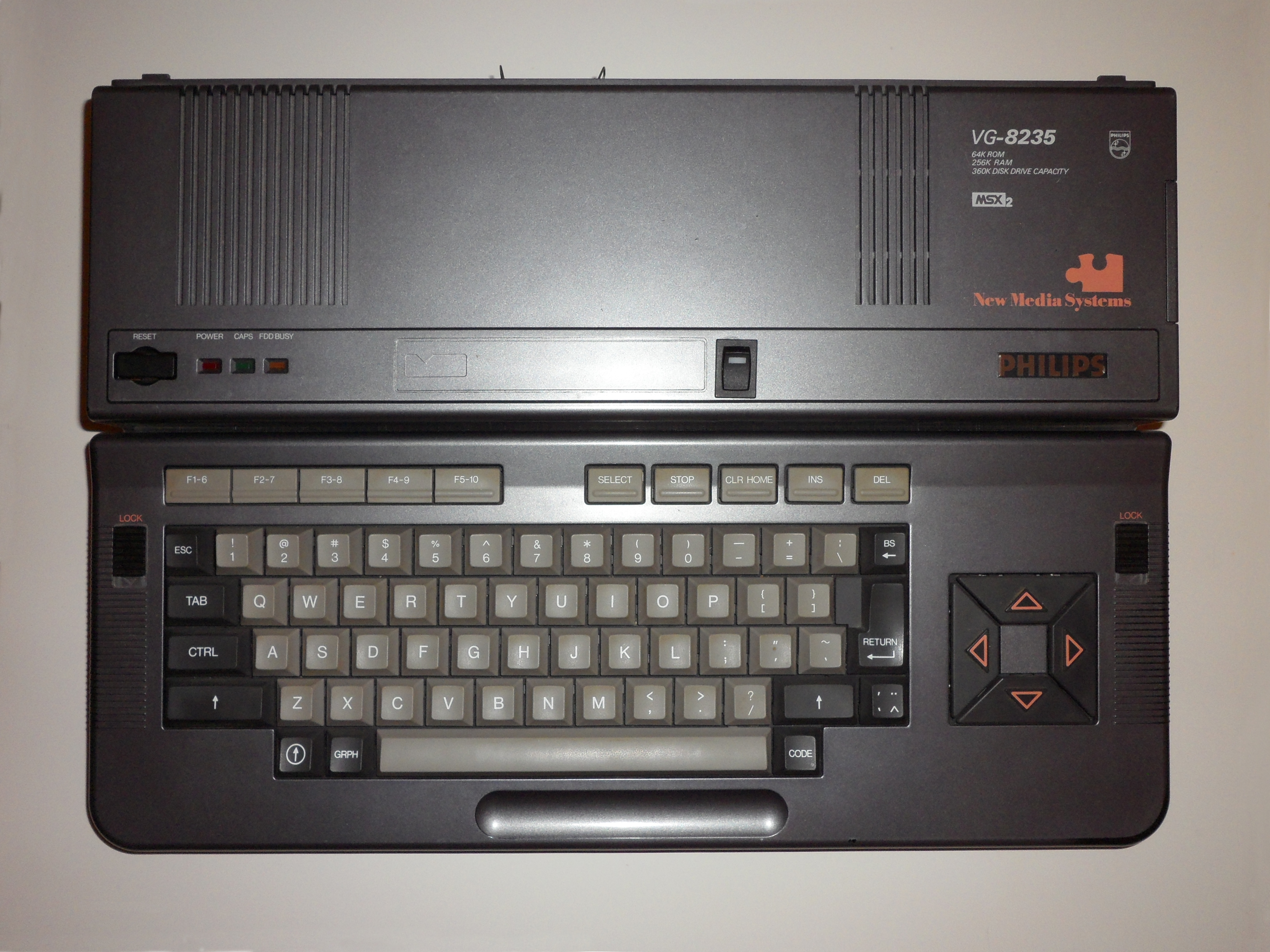
Philips VG-8235 MSX2

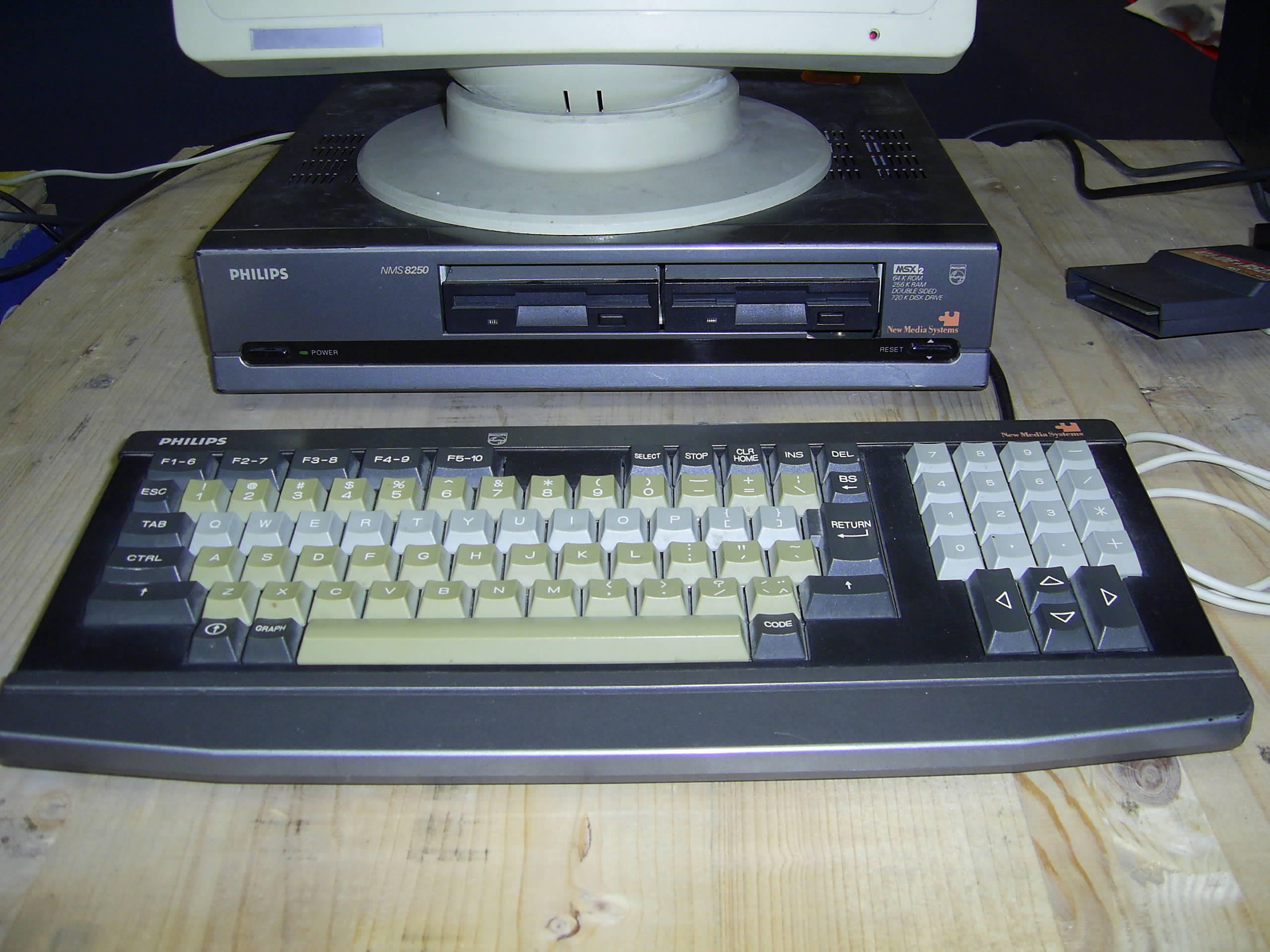
Philips NMS 8250

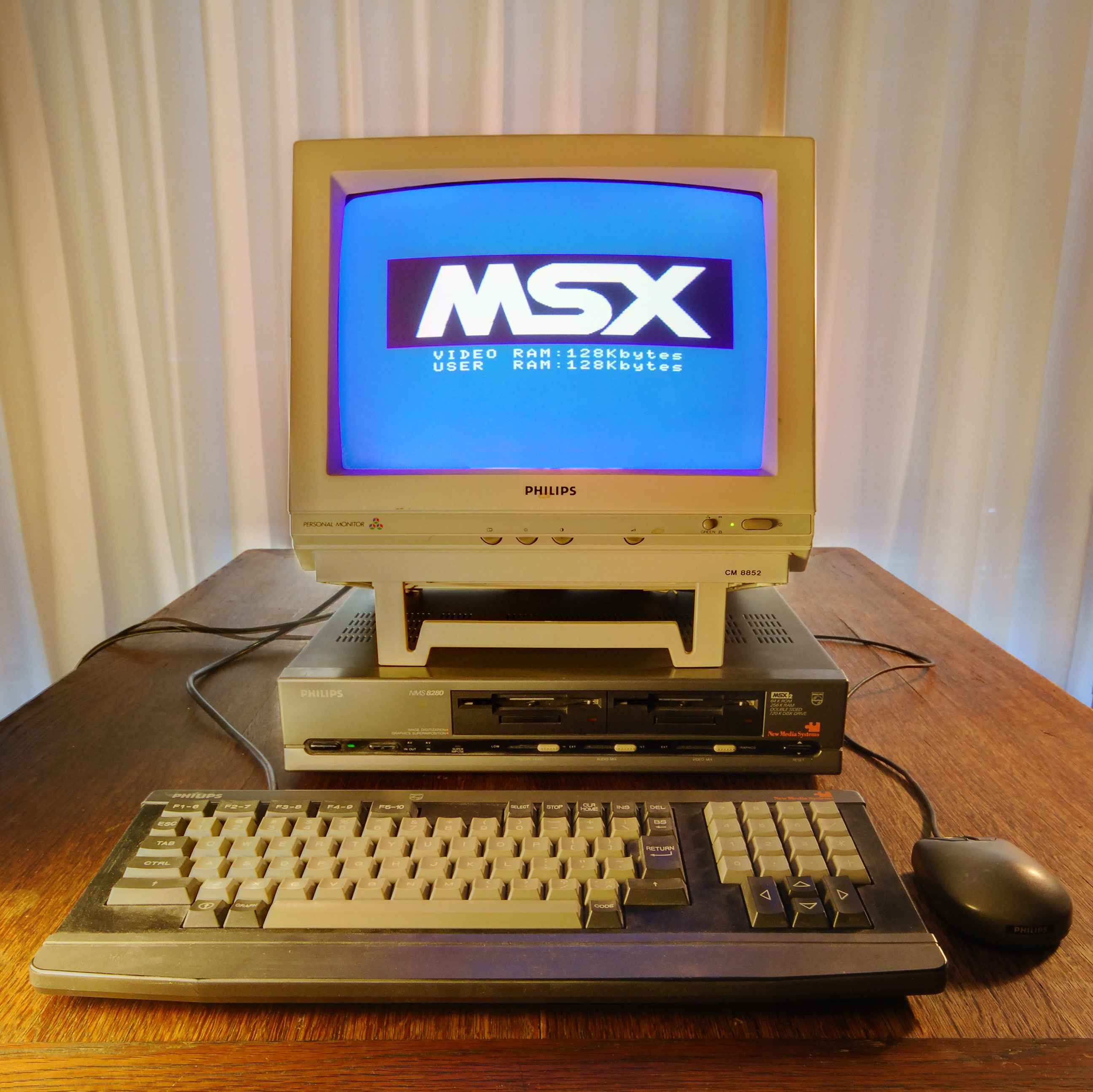
Philips NMS 8280

- Philips VG-8230 (1986, Netherlands)
- Philips VG-8235 (1986, Belgium, Germany, Spain, France, Netherlands)
- Philips VG-8240 (1986, prototype)
- Philips NMS 8220 (1987, Belgium, Spain, France, Netherlands)
- Philips NMS 8245 (1987, Belgium, Spain, France, Netherlands)
- Philips NMS 8250/8255 (1987, Belgium, Spain, France, Netherlands)
- Philips NMS 8260 (1987, prototype)
- Philips NMS 8280 (1987, Belgium, Germany, Spain, France, Netherlands)
- Philips HCS 280 (1990, Spain, Italy, Netherlands)

=== NMS series ===
- Philips NMS 9100 8088 (desktop) (1980s red design)
- Philips NMS 9100 AT 80286 (desktop) (1980s red design)
- Philips NMS 9105 8088 (desktop) (1980s red design)
- Philips NMS 9110 8088 (desktop) (1980s red design)
- Philips NMS 9111 8088 (desktop) (1980s red design)
- Philips NMS 9115 8088 (desktop) (1980s red design)
- Philips NMS 9116 8088 (desktop) (1980s red design)
- Philips NMS TC 100 8088 (desktop) (1990s green design)

=== PCD series (with CD-ROM) ===
- Philips PCD 102 (8088 desktop) (no CD-ROM)
- Philips PCD 103 (8088 desktop) (no CD-ROM)
- Philips PCD 200 (286) desktop) (no CD-ROM)
- Philips PCD 203 (286 desktop) (no CD-ROM)
- Philips PCD 204 (286 desktop)
- Philips PCD 304 (386 desktop)
- Philips PCD 308 (386 desktop)
- Philips PCD 318 (386 desktop)

=== PCL series (notebook computers) ===
- Philips PCL 101 (8086 grey notebook)
- Philips PCL 203 (80286 grey notebook)
- Philips PCL 304 (80386 dark gray notebook)
- Philips PCL 320 (80386 dark grey notebook)

=== Magnavox ===
- Magnavox M16034GY System 160
- Magnavox M1101GY System 110
- Magnavox M38044GY System 380
- Magnavox M58044GY System 580SX
- Magnavox Headstart 286 (286 1990s grey design desktop)
- Magnavox Headstart 300 (286 1980s grey design desktop)
- Magnavox Headstart 300 CD (286 1980s grey design desktop)
- Magnavox Headstart 500 (386 1980s grey design desktop)
- Magnavox Headstart 500 CD (386 1980s grey design desktop)
- Magnavox Headstart 386 SX (386 1990s grey design desktop)
- Magnavox Headstart 386 SX-16 (386 1990s grey design desktop)
- Magnavox Headstart 386 SX/20 (386 1990s grey design desktop)
- Magnavox Headstart 386/33 (386 (not yet identified)
- Magnavox Headstart 486 SX (486 1990s grey design desktop)
- Magnavox Headstart 486 DX (486 1990s grey design desktop)
- Magnavox Magnum GL (not yet identified)
- Magnavox Magnum SX (386sx/16 turbo)
- Magnavox MaxStation 286 (not yet identified)
- Magnavox MaxStation 386-SX (not yet identified)
- Magnavox MaxStation 386SX/16 (not yet identified)
- Magnavox MaxStation 380 (not yet identified)
- Magnavox MaxStation 480 (not yet identified)
- Magnavox Metalis SX/16 (386) (dark grey notebook)
- Magnavox Metalis SX/20 (386) (dark grey notebook)
- Magnavox Professional 386 SX-20 (386 1990s grey design desktop)
- Magnavox Professional 386 DX-33 (386 1990s grey design desktop)

=== Philips Internal Reference (not sold) ===
- Avenger (sold as: MaxStation 286, Magnum GL, Headstart 300)
- P 3212 (sold as: MaxStation 480, Headstart 380)
- P 3239 (sold as: Headstart/MaxStation/Magnum/Professional 1200, 48CD, 1600, 64CD, P160, SR16CD)
- P 3349 (sold as: Headstart/MaxStation/Magnum/Professional SX20, 80CD)
- P 3345 (sold as: Magnavox/MaxStation 386SX, Magnum SX, Headstart Series 500)
- P 3371 (sold as: Headstart/MaxStation/Magnum/Professional 3300)

=== Third Parties ===
- Wang LE 150 (8088 based on P 3105 desktop)
- Argent Technologies 286 (desktop, not yet confirmed)
- Argent Technologies 386 SX (desktop, not yet confirmed)
- Argent Technologies 386 DX (desktop, not yet confirmed)
- Argent Technologies 486 DX 33 (486 based on P 3355 desktop)
- Argent Technologies 486 MT (mini tower, not yet confirmed)

=== Vendex HeadStart ===
- HeadStart Turbo 888 XT, 8088 desktop.
- HeadStart Explorer, 8088 Amiga 500 style.
- HeadStart Plus, 8088 desktop.
- HeadStart LX-40, 8088 desktop.
- HeadStart LX-CD, 8088 desktop with CD-ROM.
- HeadStart II, 8088 desktop.
- HeadStart III, 286 desktop (made in Korea).
- HeadStart III CD, 286 desktop with CD-ROM.
- HeadStart Pro, 286 & 386.

=== Monitors – Magnavox / Philips ===
These monitors were sold / shipped with Magnavox / Philips PCs:

- 20CM64: 20" VGA color CRT
- 3CM9809: 14" VGA color CRT
- 7BM623: 12" TTL CRT
- 7BM749: 14" VGA monochrome CRT
- 7CM321: 14" VGA color CRT
- 8CM643: 12" TTL CRT
- 9CM053: 14" CGA/EGA color CRT
- 9CM062: 14" VGA color CRT
- 9CM073: 14" CGA/EGA color CRT
- 9CM082: 14" VGA color CRT
- BM7622: 12" TTL CRT
- CM2080: 14" color CRT for Macintosh
- CM2089: 14" VGA color CRT
- CM2099: 14" VGA color CRT
- CM4015: 15" VGA color CRT
- CM4017: 17" VGA color CRT
- CM8502: 12" TTL CRT
- CM8552: 12" TTL CRT
- CM8762: 12" TTL CRT
- CM8833: 12" TTL CRT
- CM9032: 14" VGA color CRT
- CM9043: 12" TTL CRT

=== Monitors – Vendex ===
These monitors were sold / shipped with Vendex PCs:

- M-888-C: CGA CRT: shipped with the HeadStart LX-40.
- M-888-VC: VGA color CRT: shipped with the HeadStart III
- M-888-MV: VGA monochrome CRT: shipped with the HeadStart III
- M-1031-CVGA: VGA CRT color: shipped with the HeadStart III

=== Peripherals ===
- Philips P 2813 keyboard: shipped with PCs with 8088 through 386 processors (also shipped with Magnavox logo)
- Philips P 2814 keyboard: shipped with PCs with 286 and up processors (also shipped with Magnavox logo)
- Philips serial mouse, FCC ID FSU4VVGMZAS: shipped with PCs with 8088 through 386 processors (not clear whether also shipped with Magnavox logo)
- Philips NMS 1140 mouse: shipped with MSX systems
- Philips NMS 1445 mouse: shipped with PCs with 8088 processors (not clear whether also shipped with Magnavox logo)
