= Philips VG-8235 =

Home computer

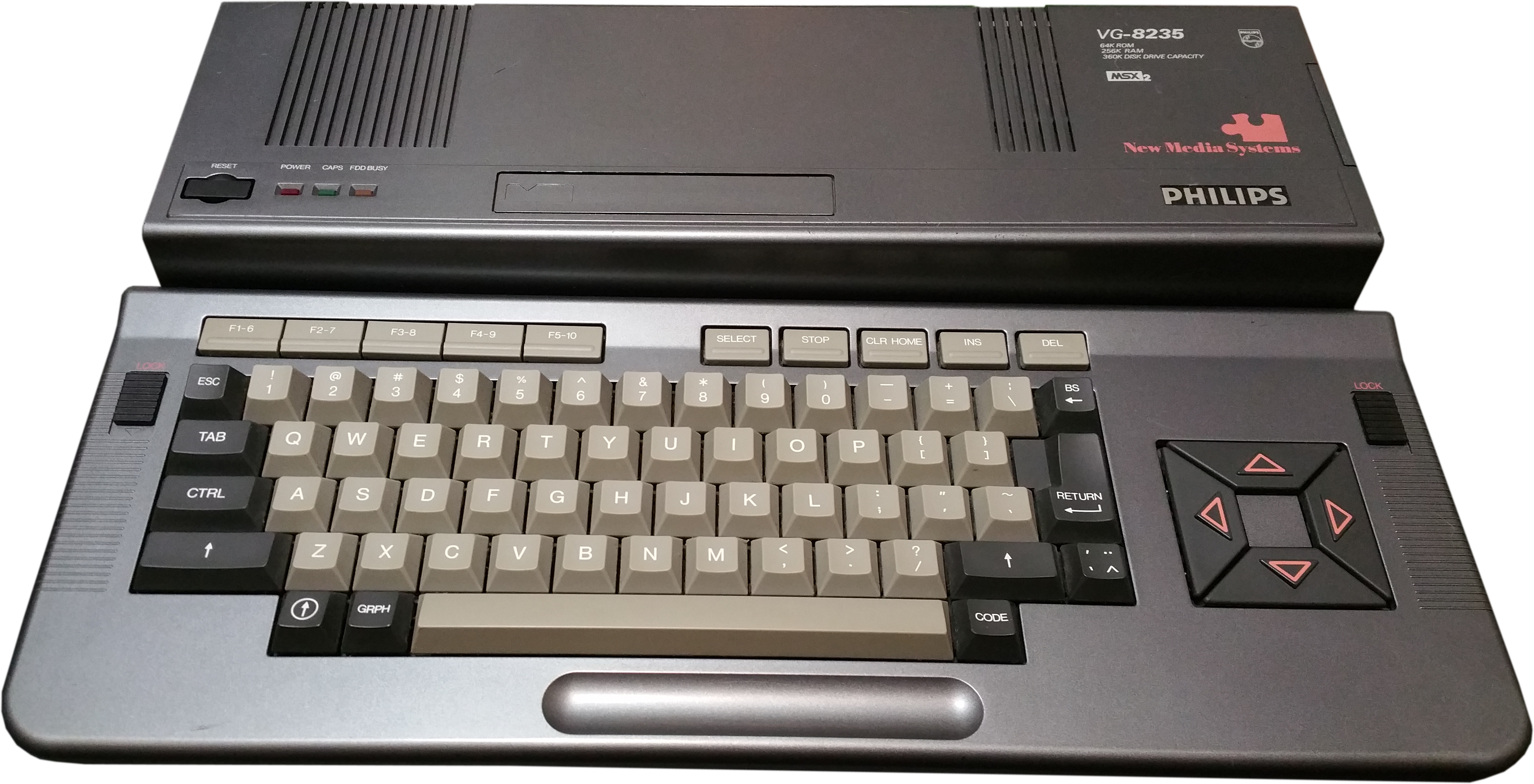
- Also known as: Phonola VG-8235
- Developer: NEC
- Type: home computer
- Released: 1986
- Operating system: MSX-DOS 1.0, MSX BASIC 2.0
- CPU: Zilog Z80A @ 3.58 MHz
- Memory: 128 KB
- Removable storage: floppy disc
- Graphics: Yamaha V9938
- Backward compatibility: MSX2

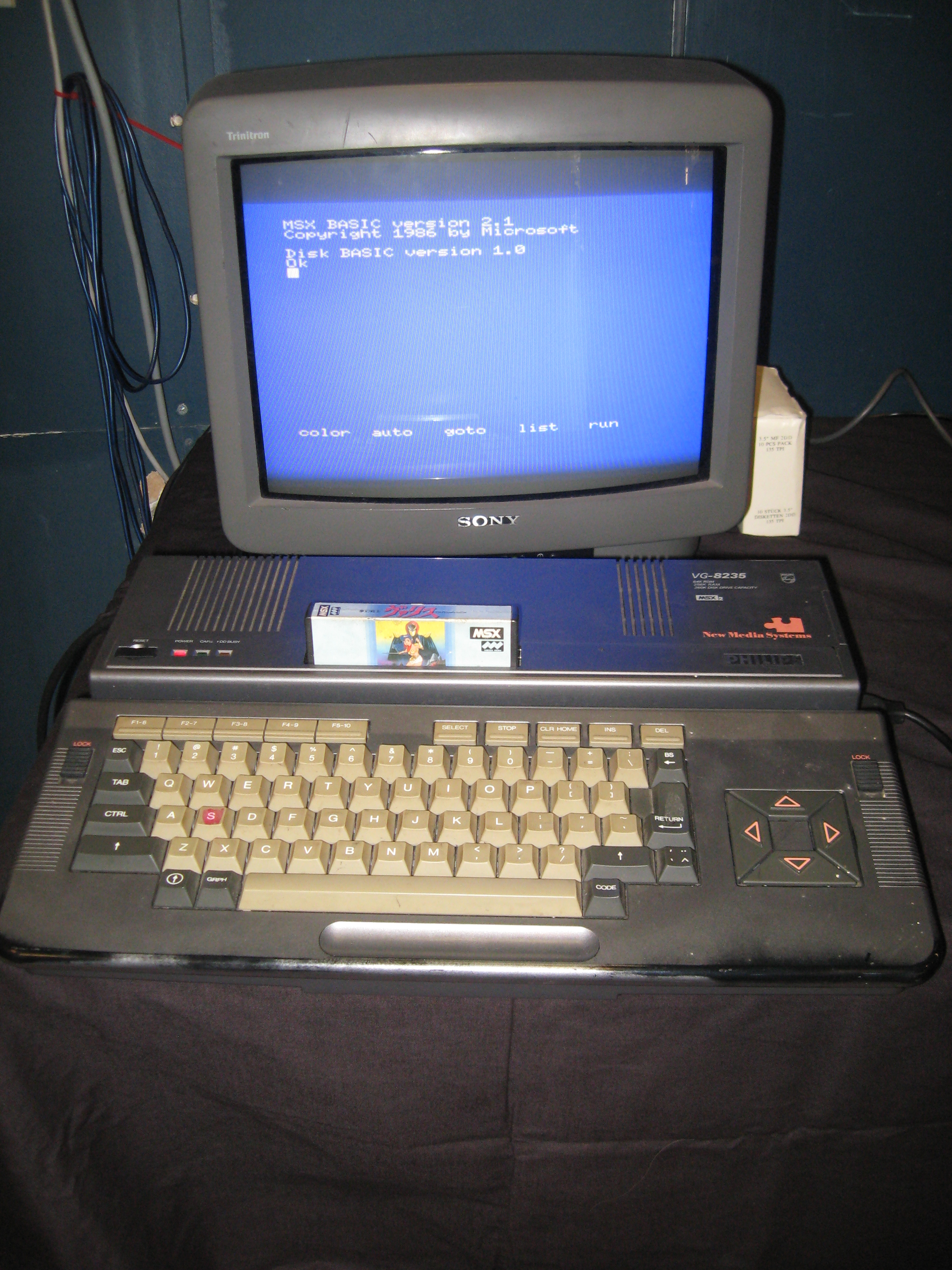
A Philips VG-8235 in operation

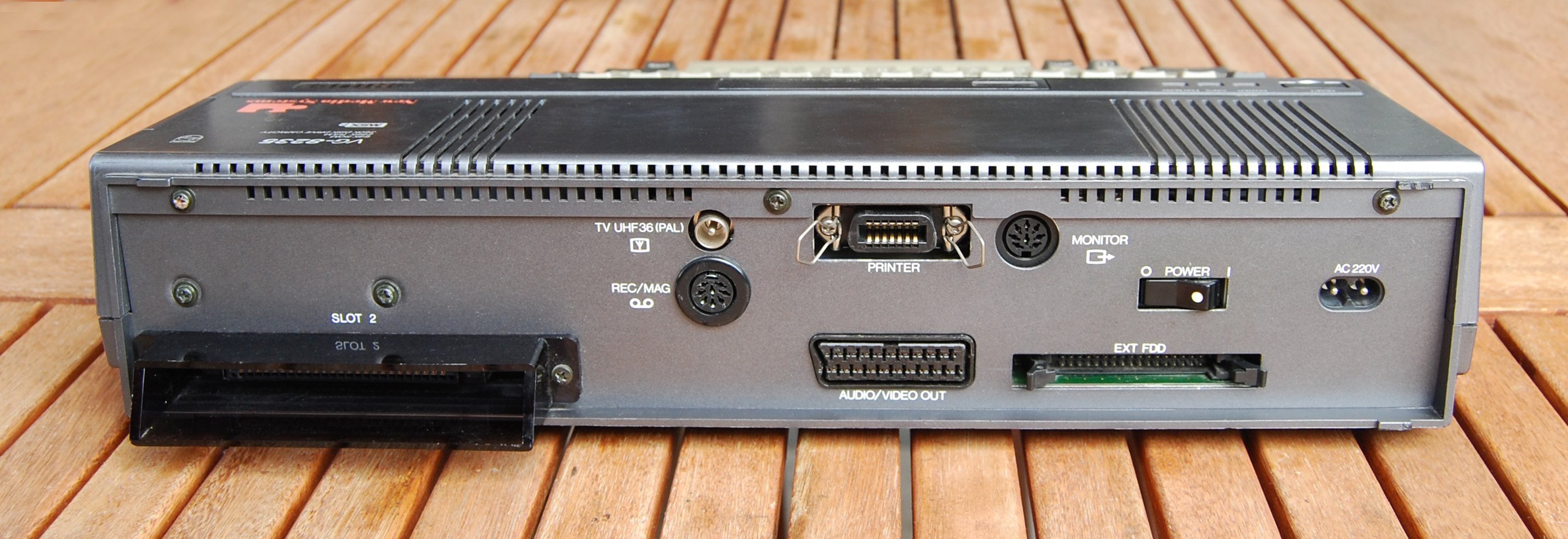
Backside interfaces of Philips VG-8235

The Philips VG-8235 is a Philips MSX2 compatible home computer, released in 1986 in Europe. It was developed and manufactured by the NEC.

The machine was the successor to the VG-8230, and features a dark case with 128KB of RAM and a built-in 360KB floppy disk drive and keyboard. The VG-8235 was eventually succeeded by the Philips NMS 8245 that offered a larger capacity 720KB floppy disc drive.

== Description ==
The VG-8235 was a versatile machine, supporting not just gaming but also productivity tasks like word processing and programming. It was compatible with the popular BASIC programming language, making it a practical machine for hobbyists and students learning to code.

Various models were produced:

- VG-8235/00 with MSX-BASIC 2.0 and QWERTY keyboard;
- VG-8235/02 for the German market with MSX-BASIC 2.0 and QWERTZ keyboard;
- VG-8235/16 for the Spanish market with MSX-BASIC 2.0 and QWERTY keyboard with ñ key;
- VG-8235/19 for the French market with MSX-BASIC 2.0 and AZERTY keyboard;
- VG-8235/20 revised model with MSX-BASIC 2.1 and QWERTY keyboard;
- VG-8235/22/29 for the German market with MSX-BASIC 2.1 and QWERTZ keyboard;
- VG-8235/36 for the Spanish market with MSX-BASIC 2.1 and QWERTY keyboard with ñ key;
- VG-8235/39 for the French market with MSX-BASIC 2.1 and AZERTY keyboard.

The computer was sold in Italy as the Phonola VG-8235.

The VG-8235 comes with two disks containing applications: MSX-DOS 1, MSX Home Office and MSX Designer.

== Specifications ==
The Philips VG-8235 had the following technical specifications:

- CPU: Zilog Z80A at 3.58 MHz
- RAM: 128 KB
- VRAM: 128 KB
- Graphics: Yamaha V9938 (screen modes: 256×192, 512×212 with 16 colors out of a palette of 512)
- Sound: proprietary sound chip
- Storage: Built-in 360 KB 3.5-inch floppy disk drive
- Operating System: MSX-DOS 1.0, MSX BASIC 2.0
- Ports: two joystick ports, printer port, two cartridge slots, video output (RF, RGB, composite), cassette tape interface
