= Philips NMS 8280 =

Home computer

NMS 8280
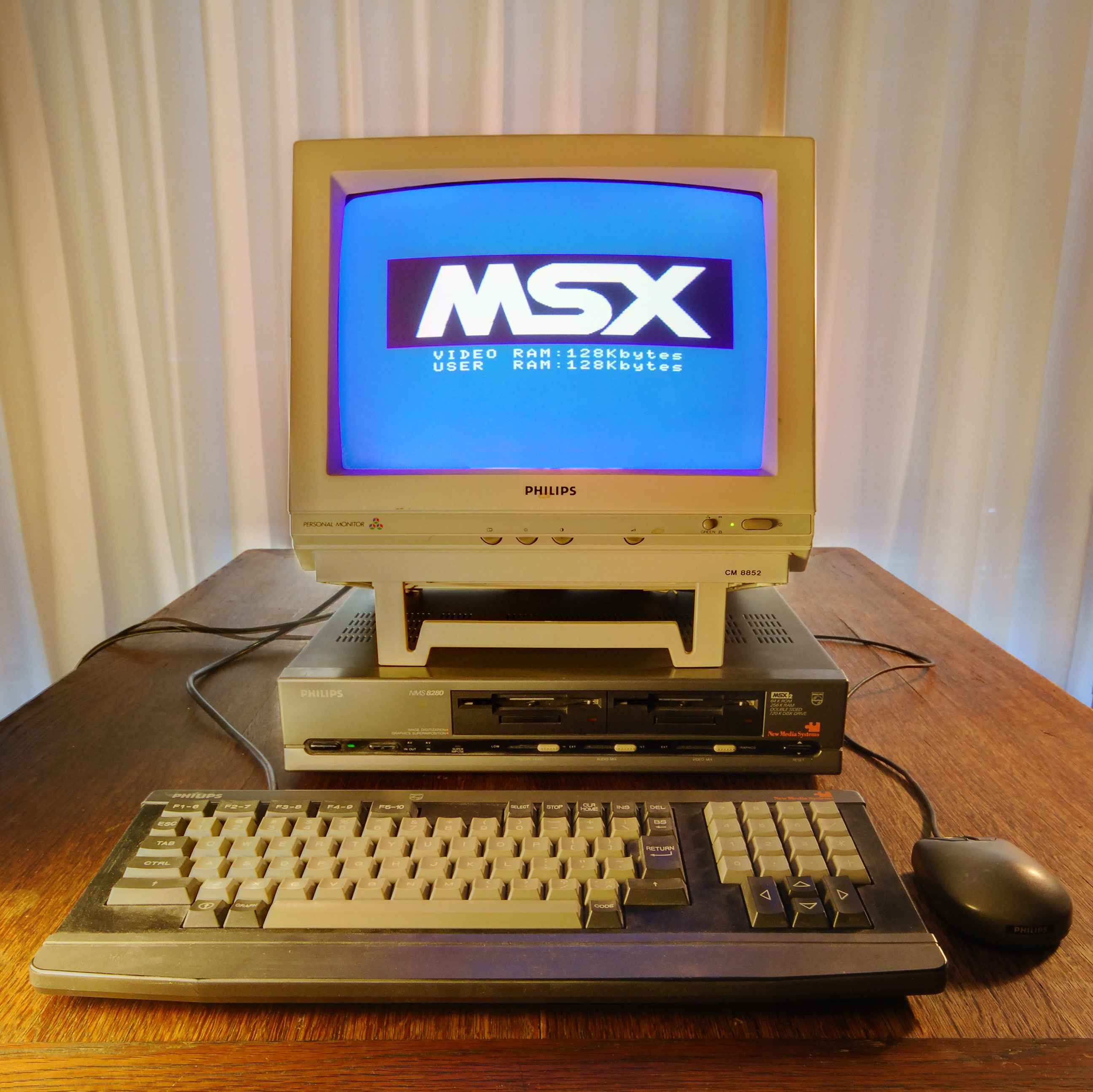
- Also known as: Phonola NMS 8280, Philips HCS 280
- Developer: Sanyo
- Manufacturer: Philips
- Type: home computer
- Released: 1987
- Operating system: MSX BASIC
- CPU: Zilog Z80A @ 3.58 MHz
- Memory: 128 KB
- Removable storage: floppy discs
- Display: 512×212 with 16 from 512 colors; 256×212 with 256 from 512 colors
- Graphics: Yamaha V9938
- Sound: S-3527 (3 sound channels, one noise channel)
- Backward compatibility: MSX2

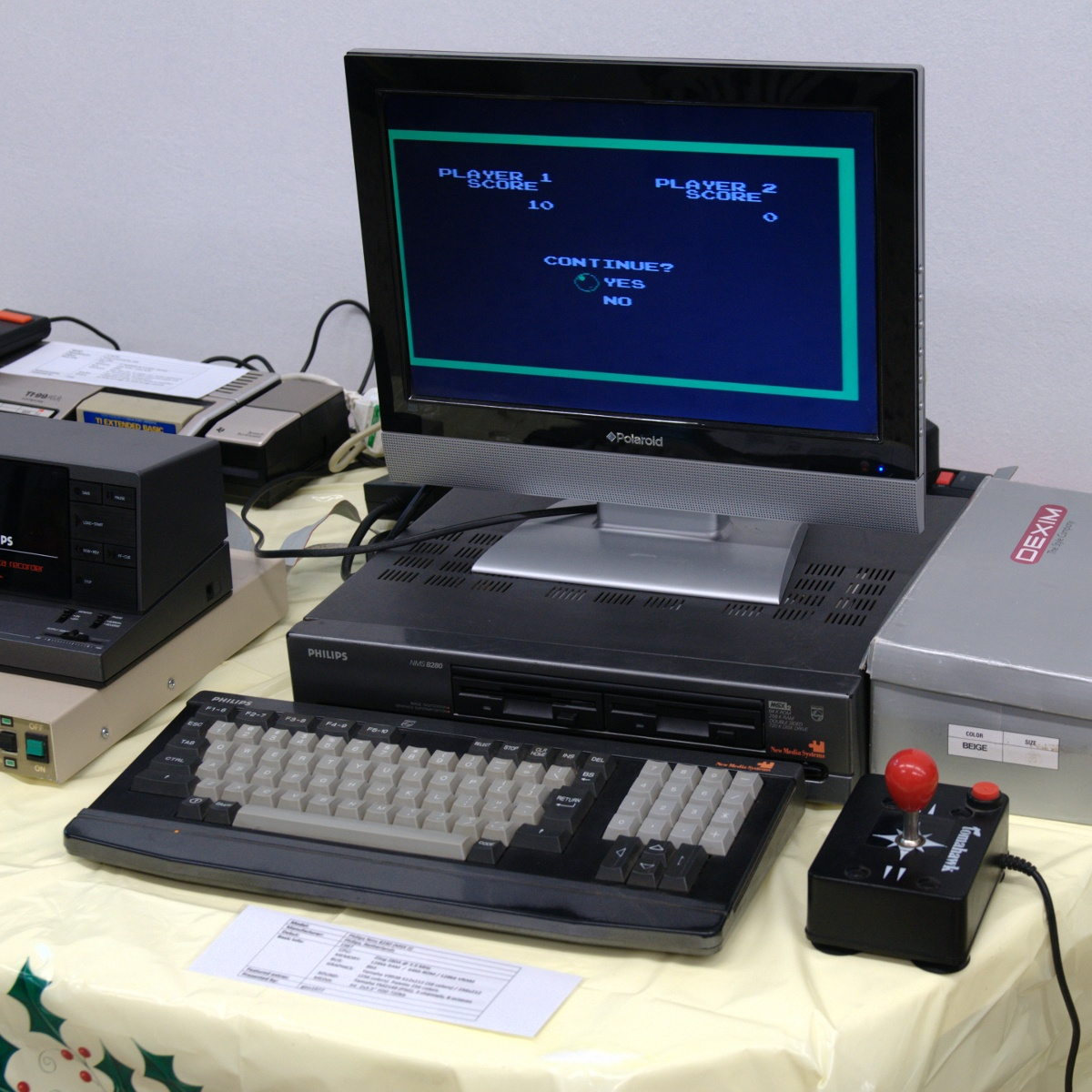
Philips NMS 8280 on display at Retrosystems 2010

The Philips NMS 8280 was a MSX2 computer from the Dutch company Philips, launched in 1987. The abbreviation NMS stands for New Media System. Its integrated genlock enabled professional video use, and the case allowed installation in a video rack. Intended be a video editing system, the machine was sold with a mouse. The hardware was developed by Sanyo and is based on the Sanyo MPC-27.

== Description ==
The computer was divided into a desktop case and an external keyboard, with a similar appearance to the NMS 8250 and NMS 8255. Technically it was similar to the Philips VG-8235.

The computer was equipped with a Zilog Z80A microprocessor with a clock frequency of 3.58 MHz. The RAM and video memory were both 128 KB in size. It had a Yamaha YM9938 VDP video display processor and an S3527 sound chip that enabled three voices over eight octaves. The Philips NMS-8280 had a cassette interface, video input and output, two cartridge slots and one connection each for the keyboard and a printer. It also had an RF antenna connection and two ports for joysticks. Two 3.5-inch floppy drives for 720 KB diskettes were included as standard.

With the integrated genlock an external source could be connected to the video input and the image could be digitized. The Philips NMS 8280 has front sliders to control video and audio digitization levels and an input selector. The digitized image had a resolution of 256×212 pixels with 256 colors. The signal from the external video source could be mixed with the computer image to create video effects and display image titles.

The NSM 8280 came with three software disks: MSX-DOS 1, Home Office 2, Video Graphics and Demo disk.

Four models were produced with different regional keyboards:

- NMS 8280/00 for the Dutch and Belgian market with QWERTY keyboard;
- NMS 8280/02 and NMS 8280/09 for the German market with QWERTZ keyboard;
- NMS 8280/16 for the Spanish market with QWERTY keyboard adding the ñ key;
- NMS 8280/19 for the French market with AZERTY keyboard.

In Italy the machine was sold as Phonola NMS 8280. A rare white 1990 version was sold as Philips HCS 280.

== Specifications ==
The Philips NMS 8280 had the following hardware specifications:

- CPU: Zilog Z80A at 3.58 MHz.
- RAM: 128 KB
- VRAM: 128 KB
- Display: Yamaha V9938 (80×24, 40×24 and 32×24 character text in four colors - two foreground colors and two background colors; resolution of 512×212 pixels (with 16 from 512 colors) or 256×212 (with 256 from 512 colors).
- Sound: PSG (S-3527, 3 sound channels, one noise channel)
- Storage: two 3.5'' disk drives (720KB)
- Ports: DIN cassette interface, composite and SCART video input and output, two cartridge slots, keyboard connector, printer port, RF TV out, two joystick ports
- Operating system: MSX Basic
