= HB-F9P =

- Manufacturer: Sony
- Type: personal computer
- Released: 1985
- Operating system: MSX BASIC & Memovision software suite
- CPU: LH-0080 or μPD780C @ 4.77 MHz
- Memory: 128 KB
- Removable storage: Cartridge
- Display: RF-output, CVBS monitor, luminance output; 256×212 (256 colors), 512×212 pixels (16 colors of 512)
- Graphics: V9938
- Sound: YM2149

The HB-F9P was a Sony MSX2-computer, launched in 1985. The abbreviation HB stands for Hit Bit.

The HB-F9P was unusual in the sense that it did not come with a built in floppy disk drive, instead it had a built in software suite "Memovision" that would run automatically unless a program cartridge was inserted in the cartridge slot or the GRAPH key was pressed during booting.

Memovision could store data on the special HBI-55 (battery backed RAM) "data cartridge" that Sony originally had developed, for their HB-55 and HB-75 MSX computers. These systems contained a simple built in program called the "Personal Databank". Memovision was a continuation of the same idea, but much extended, as it contained stuff like a (birthday) calendar with alarm system, a "family databank" (a combination of a text editor and database) a built in calculator and a timer and time calculator, all rendered in pseudo 3D style.

== Variants ==
Of the HB-F9 there were many different localized variants produced:

- HB-F9P, with QWERTY-keyboard layout was designed for the PAL-standard, and meant for European countries, except Germany, France, Spain and the former Soviet Union.
- HB-F9R, had a Russian keyboard.
- HB-F9D, had a QWERTZ-keyboard for the German market
- HB-F9F, had an AZERTY-keyboard for the French market, and was designed for the SECAM-standard.
- HB-F9S, had a modified QWERTY-keyboard for the Spanish market.

== Technical specifications ==
- Processor: Sharp LH-0080 or NEC μPD780C
- ROM: 96 KB (48 KB MSX BASIC version 2.0 + 48 KB software suite)
- RAM: 128 KB VRAM + 128 KB main memory
- Video: VDP (Yamaha V9938)
  - text: 80×24, 40×24 en 32×24 (characters per line × lines) four colors, two foreground colors and two background colors
  - graphical: maximal 512×212 pixels (16 colors of 512) and 256×212 (256 colors)
  - colors: 512 maximal
- Engine: MSX-Engine S-1985
  - real-time clock with trickle-charged battery backup
- Sound: Yamaha YM2149 PSG
  - 3 sound channels and one noise channel
  - 8 octaves
- Interfaces
  - power cord
  - RF-output
  - CVBS monitor
  - luminance output
  - monochrome switch
  - headset sound output
  - data-recorder I/O (1200/2400 baud)
  - 1 general purpose expansion connector
  - printer
  - keyboard
  - 2 joysticks
  - 2 cartridge slots
