= Philips NMS 8220 =

Home computer

NMS 8220
- Developer: Philips
- Type: home computer
- Released: 1986
- Operating system: MSX BASIC V2
- CPU: Zilog Z80A @ 3.56 MHz
- Memory: 64 KB
- Graphics: Yamaha V9938
- Backward compatibility: MSX2

The Philips NMS 8220 is a personal computer released in 1986 and compatible with the MSX2 standard. Developed by the Dutch electronics company Philips, it was aimed at both home users and small businesses. The NMS 8220 was one of the many computers that adhered to the MSX standard, a popular home computing platform in the 1980s that sought to unify hardware specifications across various manufacturers, enabling software compatibility.

== Description ==
The NMS (New Media Systems) branding reflected Philips' efforts to market the machine with a focus on multimedia, contrary to the previous VG (Video Game) series machines . The NMS 8220 was positioned as being able to handle productivity and educational software besides games. This was reinforced by inclusion of the "MSX Designer" program in ROM, with the machine booting it automatically.

The NMS 8220 featured a compact all-in-one design similar to the previous VG-8020. Two models were produced: the NMS 8220/00, sold mainly in Belgium, France and Netherlands; and the NMS 8220/16 sold in Spain with a different keyboard.

== Specifications ==
The NMS 8220 has the following technical specifications:

- CPU: Zilog Z80A at 3.58 MHz
- RAM: 64 KB
- VRAM: 128 KB
- Graphics: Yamaha V9938 (screen modes ranging from 256 x 192 pixels with 16 colors to 512 x 212 pixels with 16 colors; sprites and hardware scrolling)
- Storage: Cassette tape
- Ports: Includes two joystick ports, a printer port, two cartridges slots, a DIN-8 cassette port, a Scart connector, a DIN-8 monitor out and a RF video connector.
- Operating System: "MSX Designer" and MSX BASIC in ROM.
