= Philips VG-8230 =

Personal computer

- Developer: Philips
- Type: home computer
- Released: 1986
- Operating system: MSX BASIC, MSX Disk BASIC
- CPU: Zilog Z80A @ 3.58 MHz
- Memory: 64 KB
- Removable storage: floppy disc
- Graphics: Yamaha V9938
- Backward compatibility: MSX2

The Philips VG-8230 was a MSX2 standard compatible personal computer released in 1986. It was the first MSX2 machine from Philips, aimed at home users with a focus on gaming and productivity.

The VG-8230 was only released in Netherlands. With only 64 KB of RAM, it was quickly replaced by the Philips VG-8235 which offered 128 KB of memory.

== Description ==
The machine featured a dark case with a built-in keyboard and a 360 KB capacity 3.5-inch floppy disk drive on the right side.

The VG-8230 came with MSX BASIC built into the ROM, allowing users to write and execute their own programs. This version of BASIC was extended to take advantage of the improved graphics and memory of the MSX2 standard.

The machine came with two discs, containing productivity software: MSX-DOS 1, MSX Home Office and MSX Designer.

== Specifications ==
The Philips VG-8230 had the following technical specifications:

- CPU: Zilog Z80A, running at 3.58 MHz
- RAM: 64 KB
- VRAM: 128 KB
- Graphics: Yamaha V9938 (up to 512×212 pixels with 16 colors from a palette of 512, and 80×24 text mode)
- Sound: Yamaha AY-3-8910 PSG (Programmable Sound Generator), providing three channels of sound
- Storage: 3.5" floppy disk drive (360 KB capacity per disk)
- Ports: Two joystick ports, RGB video output, composite video output, audio output, centronics printer port, cartridge slot
- Operating system: MSX Disk BASIC, MSX BASIC
