= NMS-8250 =

Professional MSX 2 home computer by Philips

Philips NMS 8250
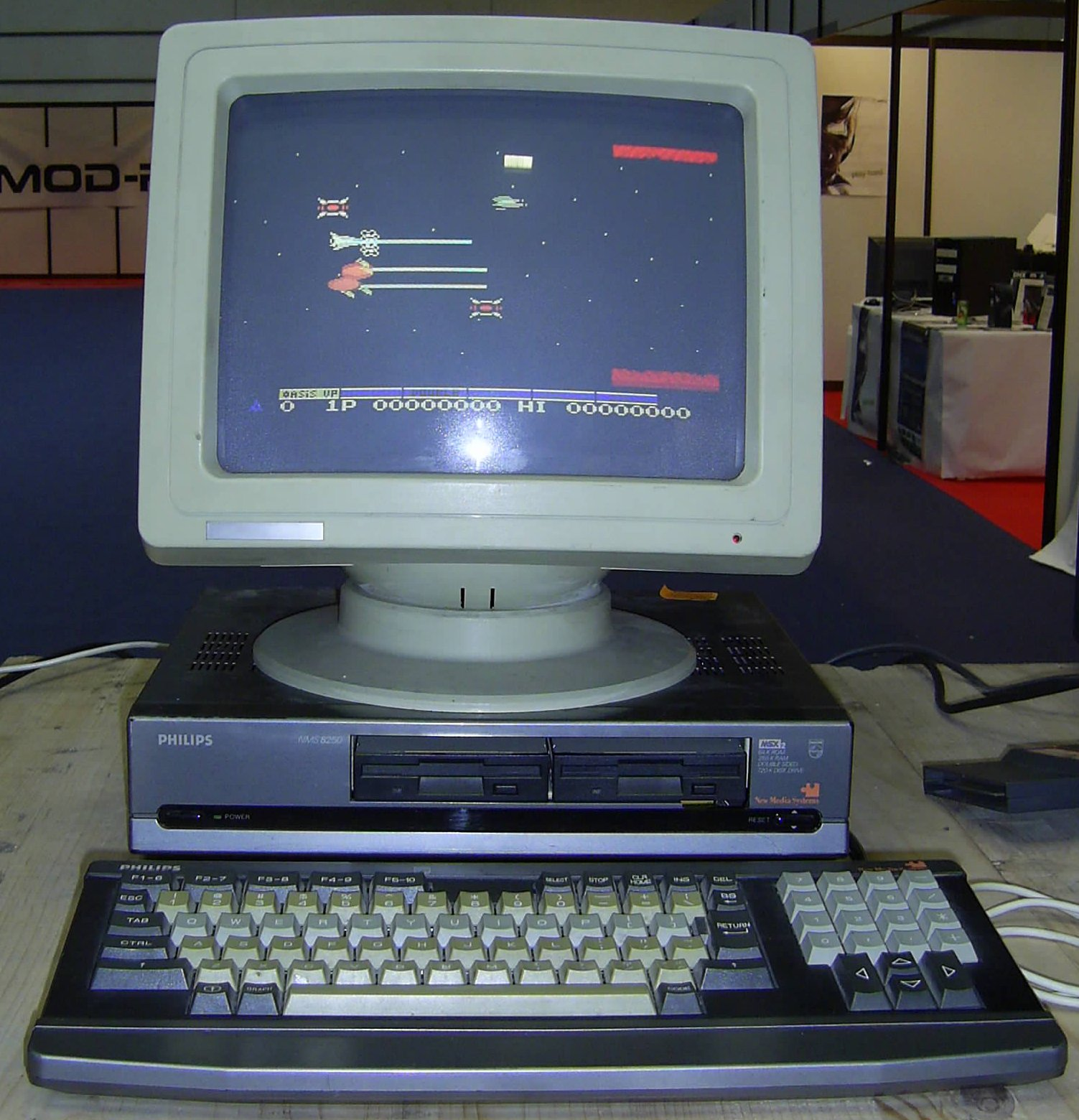
- Philips NMS 8250
- Also known as: Philips NMS 8255
- Developer: Philips
- Manufacturer: Sanyo
- Type: home computer
- Released: 1986
- Operating system: MSX BASIC V2
- CPU: Zilog Z80A @ 3.579 545 MHz
- Memory: 128 KB
- Removable storage: floppy disc
- Graphics: Yamaha V9938
- Sound: S-3527 PSG
- Backward compatibility: MSX2

Philips NMS 8250, (NMS is short for "New Media Systems") was a professional MSX2 home computer for the high end market, with a built in floppy disk drive in a "pizza box" configuration, released in 1986. The machine was in fact manufactured by Sanyo and it is basically the MPC-25FS with a different color.

It featured professional video output possibilities, such as SCART for a better picture quality, and a detachable keyboard.

Three regional models were produced:

- NMS 8250/00 for the Dutch and Belgian markets with a QWERTY keyboard;
- NMS 8250/16 for the Spanish market with a QWERTY keyboard with ñ key;
- NMS 8250/19 for the French market with a AZERTY keyboard.

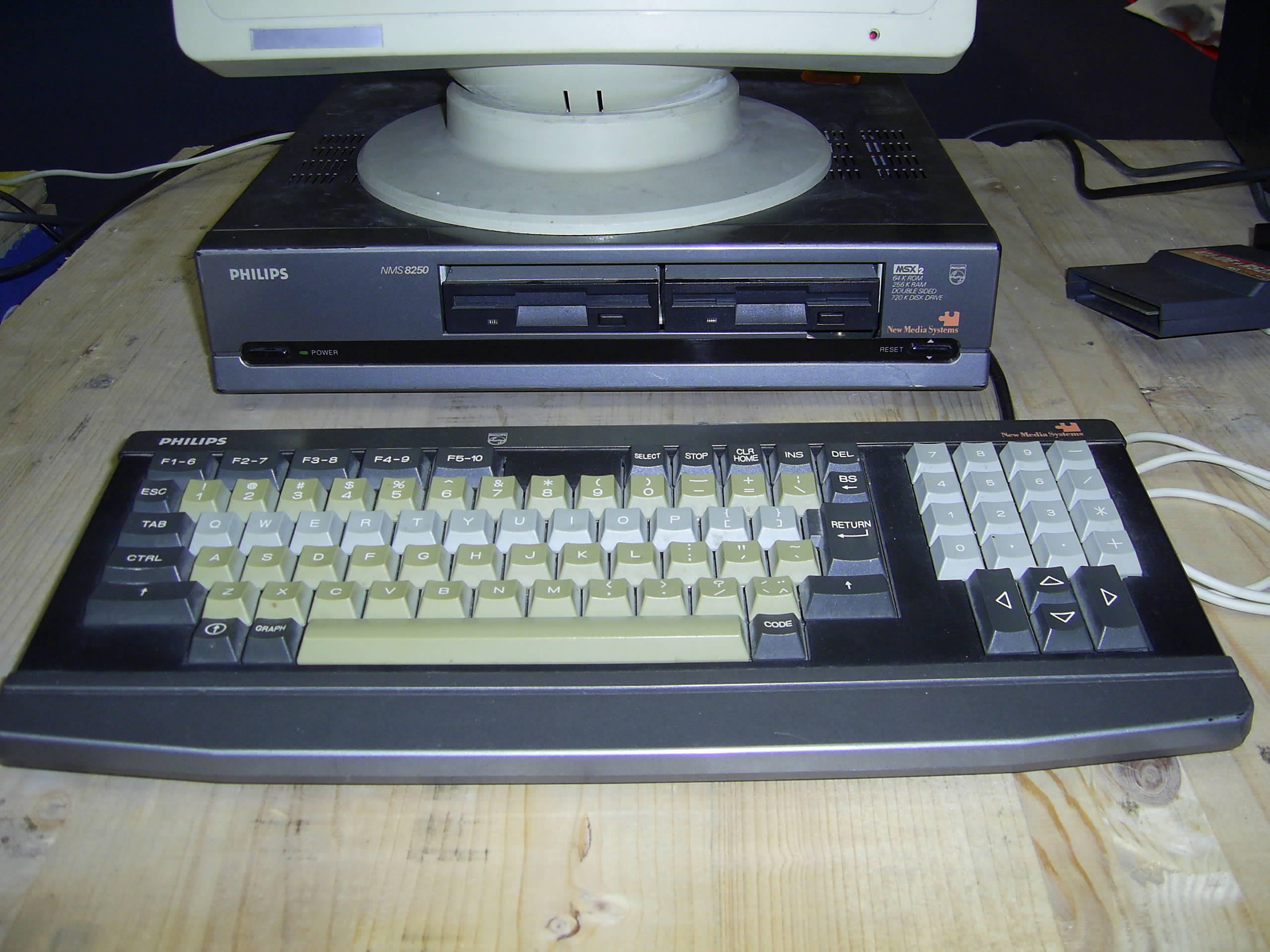
Philips NMS 8255 (variation with two disc drives)

The Philips NMS 8255 is a similar machine, but has with two disc drives instead of one.

== Specifications ==
The Philips NMS 8250/8255 have the following specifications:

- CPU: Zilog Z80A with a clock speed of 3,56 MHz
- ROM: 64 kB (MSX 2: 48 kB, Disk BASIC: 16 kB)
- RAM: 256 kB
- VRAM: 128 kB
- Display: Yamaha V9938 (80×24, 40×24 and 32×24 character text in four colors - two foreground colors and two background colors; resolution of 512×212 pixels (with 16 from 512 colors) or 256×212 (with 256 from 512 colors).
- Controller chip: MSX-Engine (S-3527, real-time clock with rechargeable battery).
- Sound: PSG (S-3527, 3 sound channels, one noise channel)
- Floppy drive: 3.5'', 720 kB double sided.
- Connectors: mains cable, RF-output, CVBS monitor, luminance video output connector (for monochrome monitors), tulip (RCA) connector audio output, SCART audio/video-output using RGB, data recorder, Centronics compatible parallel printer port, detachable keyboard connector, two joysticks, two cartridge slots.

== Gallery ==
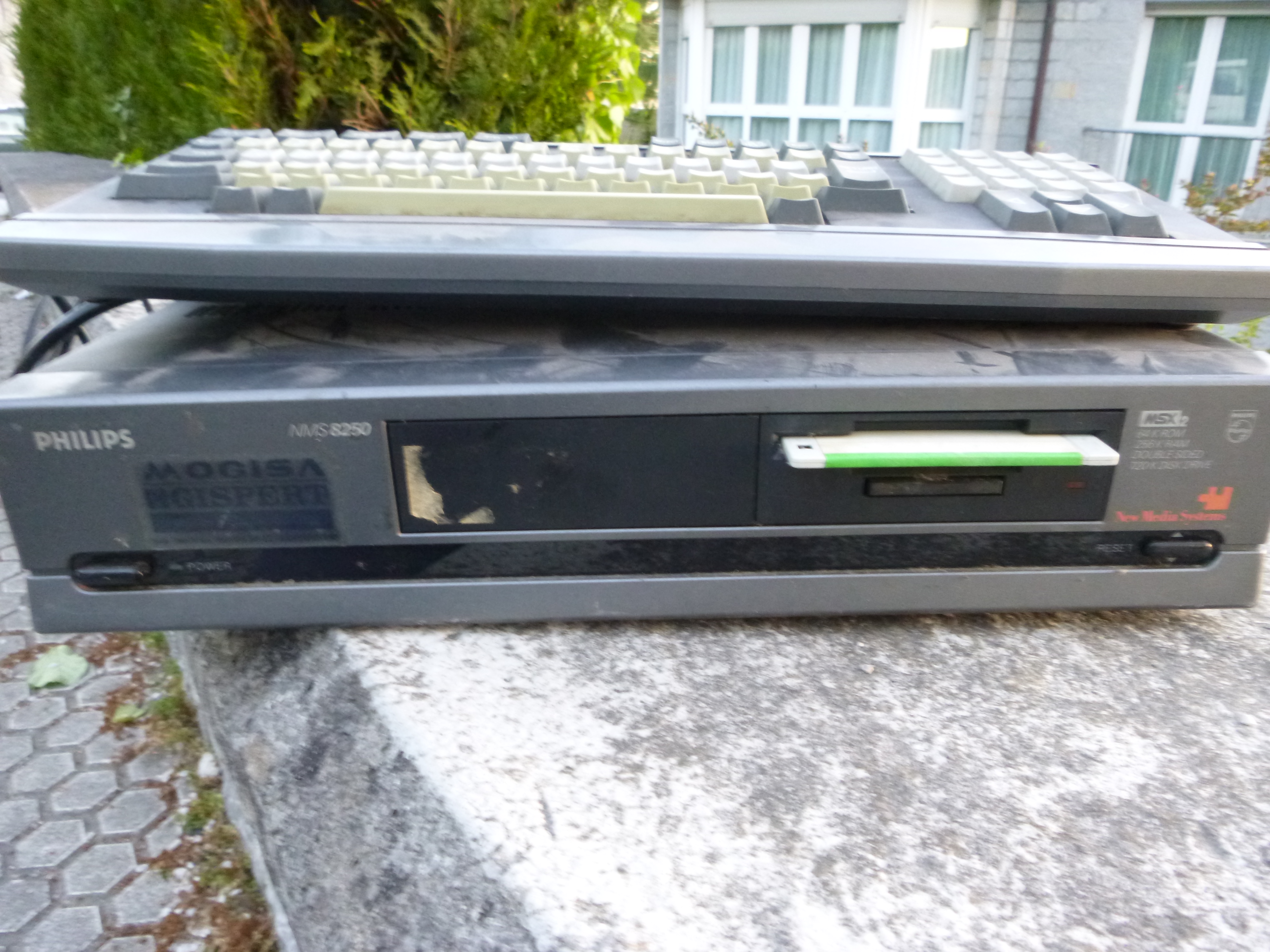
NMS 8255 front view

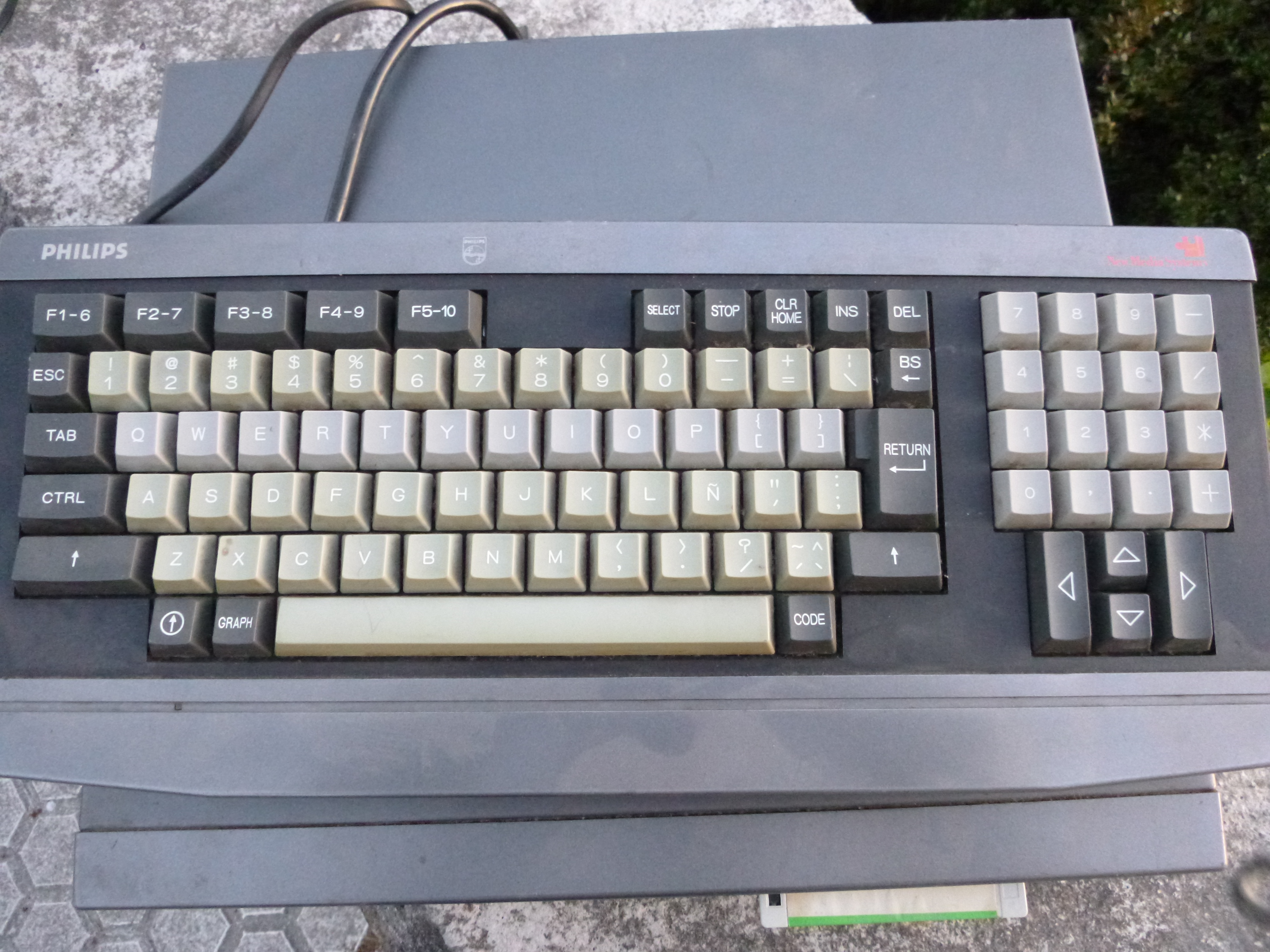
NMS 8250 keyboard

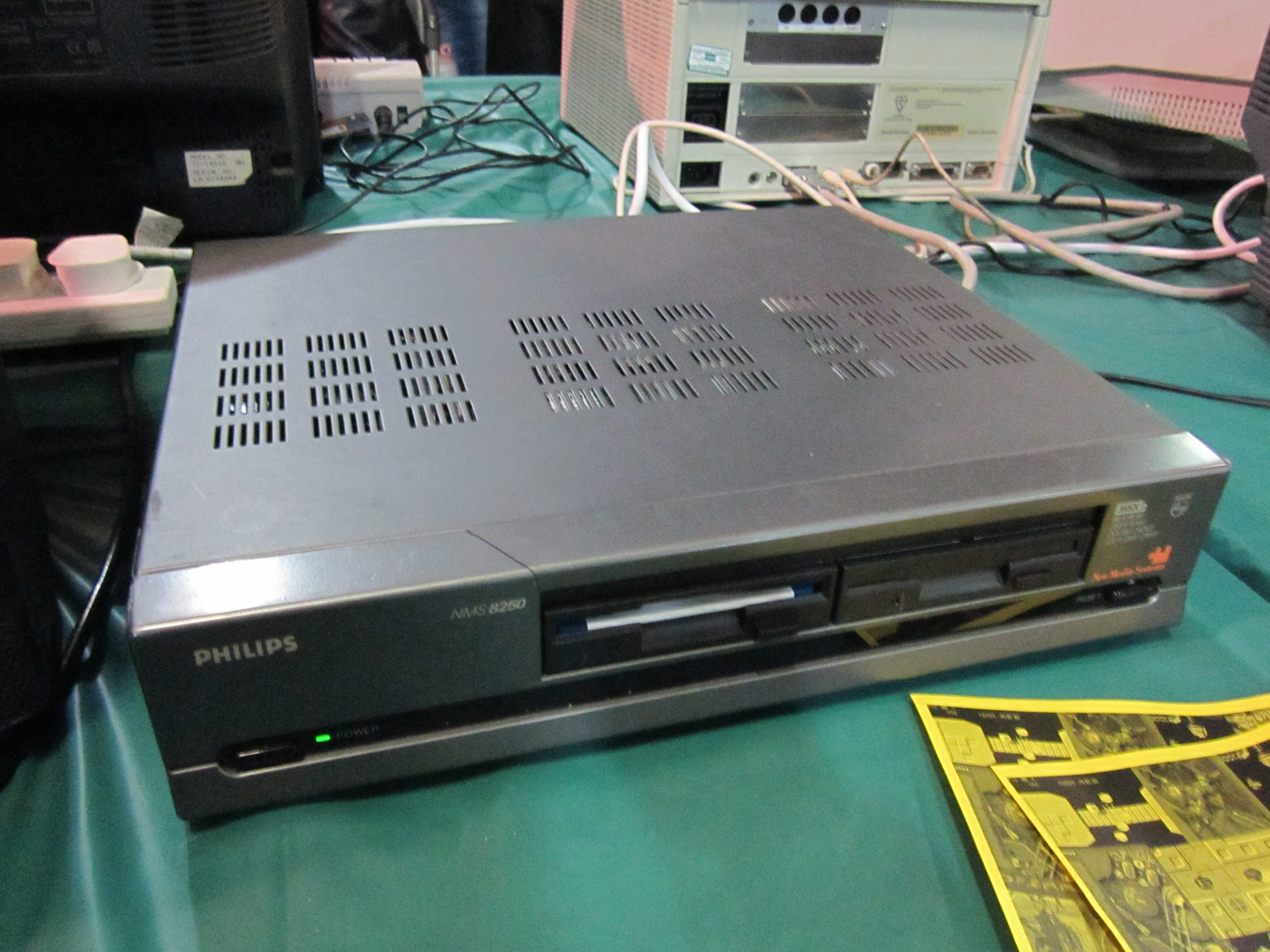
NMS 8255 (two drives) box

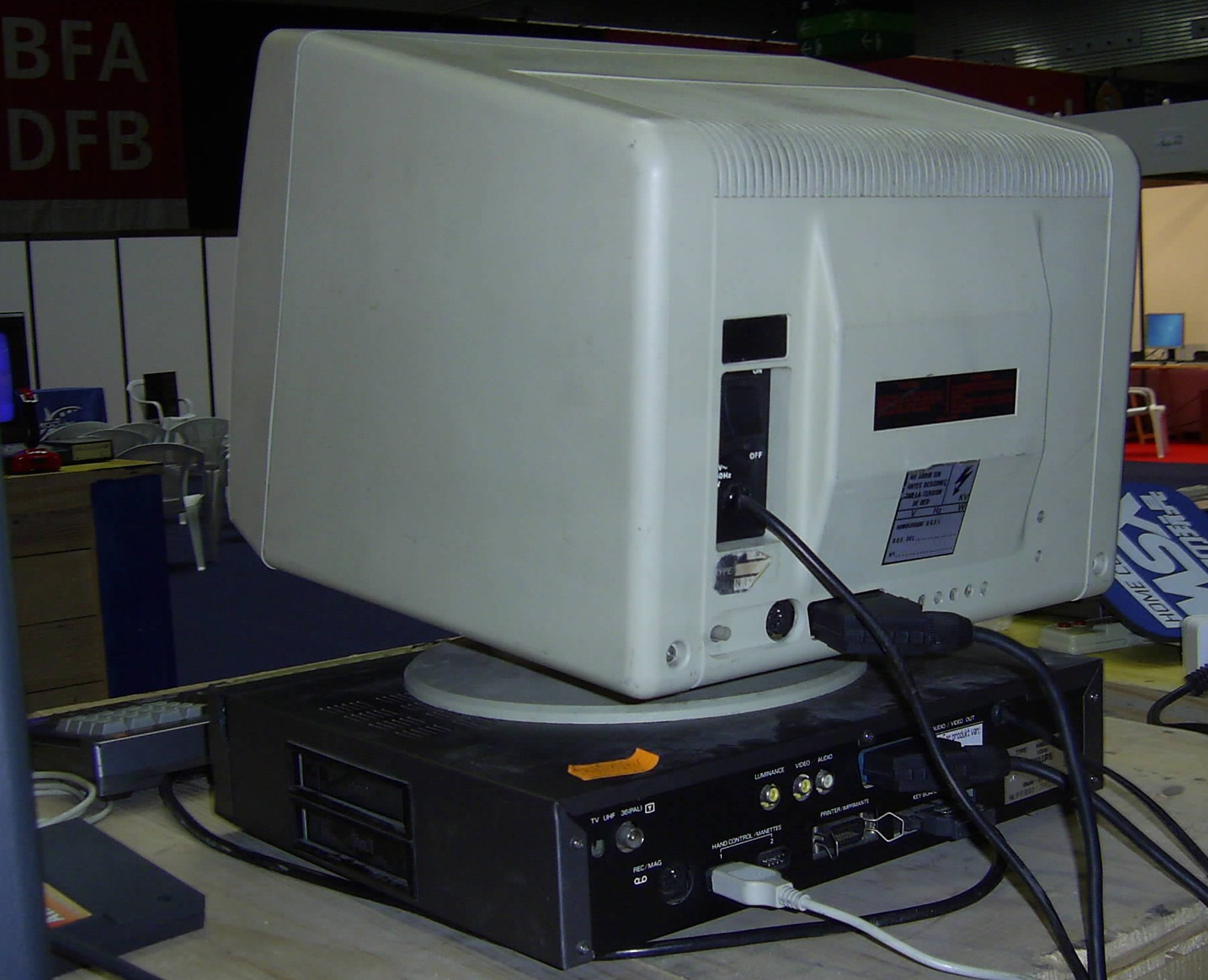
NMS 8255 back view
