= Philips NMS 8245 =

Home computer

NMS 8245
- Also known as: Phonola NMS 8245
- Developer: Philips
- Type: home computer
- Released: 1987
- Operating system: MSX-DOS 1.0, MSX BASIC 2.1, MSX Disk BASIC 1.0
- CPU: Zilog Z80A @ 3.55 MHz
- Memory: 128 KB
- Removable storage: floppy disc
- Graphics: Yamaha V9938
- Backward compatibility: MSX2

The Philips NMS 8245 is a personal computer released by Philips in 1987 as part of its MSX2 line of computers.

The NMS 8245, being compatible with the MSX2 standard, benefitted from the improvements introduced over the original MSX system, which include better graphical performance, more memory, and support for hardware sprites and smooth scrolling, which made it a popular choice for video games. However, like other MSX systems, it faced competition from other home computers such as the Commodore 64, Amiga, and Atari ST.

== Description ==
The NMS (New Media Systems) branding reflected Philips' efforts to market the machine with a focus on multimedia, contrary to the previous VG (Video Game) series machines . This was reinforced by offering the machine with three software discs: MSX-DOS 1, Ease (a multilingual office suite) and Designer Plus (a drawing program).

The Philips NMS 8245 features a black and silver plastic casing with an integrated keyboard, similar to the VG-8235. A double sided 3.5-inch disk drive was mounted on the right side of the computer, with no external connection for drives.

Three versions were produced:

- NMS 8245/00 for the Dutch and Belgian markets, with QWERTY keyboard;
- NMS 8245/16 for the Spanish market, with QWERTY keyboard with a ñ key;
- NMS 8245/19 for the French market, with AZERTY keyboard.

It was also sold in Italy as the Phonola NMS 8245. There is a version adapted for home banking, used by Italian banks and at the Milan Stock Exchange.

== Specifications ==
The NMS 8245 has the following technical specifications:

- CPU: Zilog Z80A running at 3.55 MHzService manual of the NMS 8245
- RAM: 128 KB
- VRAM: 128 KB
- Storage: internal a 3.5-inch floppy disk drive (720 KB)
- Ports: Printer port, two joystick ports, DIN-8 cassette port, DIN-8 composite monitor out, SCART RGB monitor out, RF TV out and cartridge connector
- Graphics: Yamaha V9938 (graphics modes with resolutions up to 512x212 pixels and up to 16 colors displayed simultaneously from a palette of 512 colors)
- Sound: Yamaha S3527, capable of producing 3 channels of sound.
- Operating System: MSX-DOS v 1.0, MSX BASIC v 2.1 and MSX Disk BASIC v 1.0
