= Philips VG 8000 =

Home computer

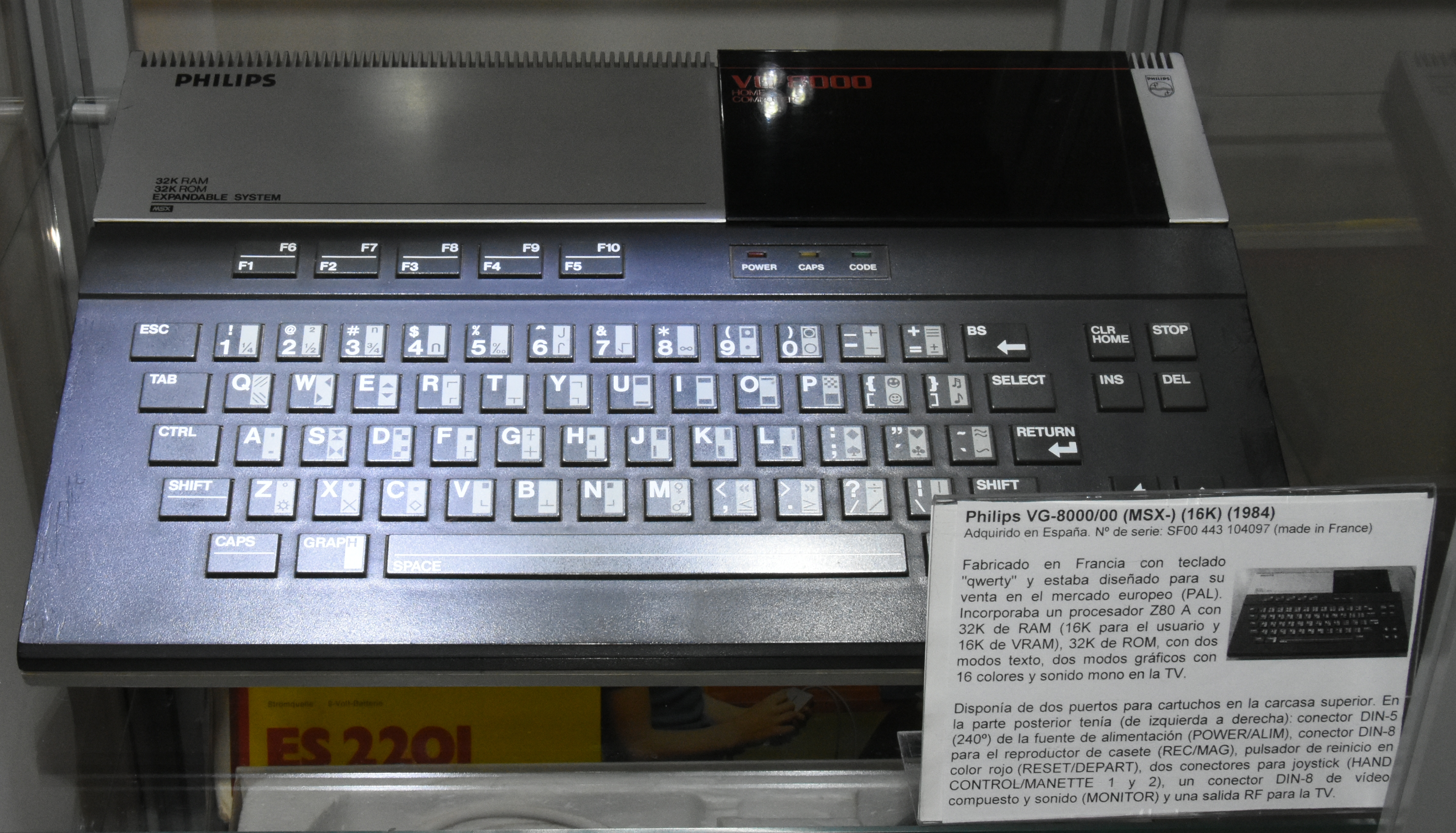
Philips VG-8000

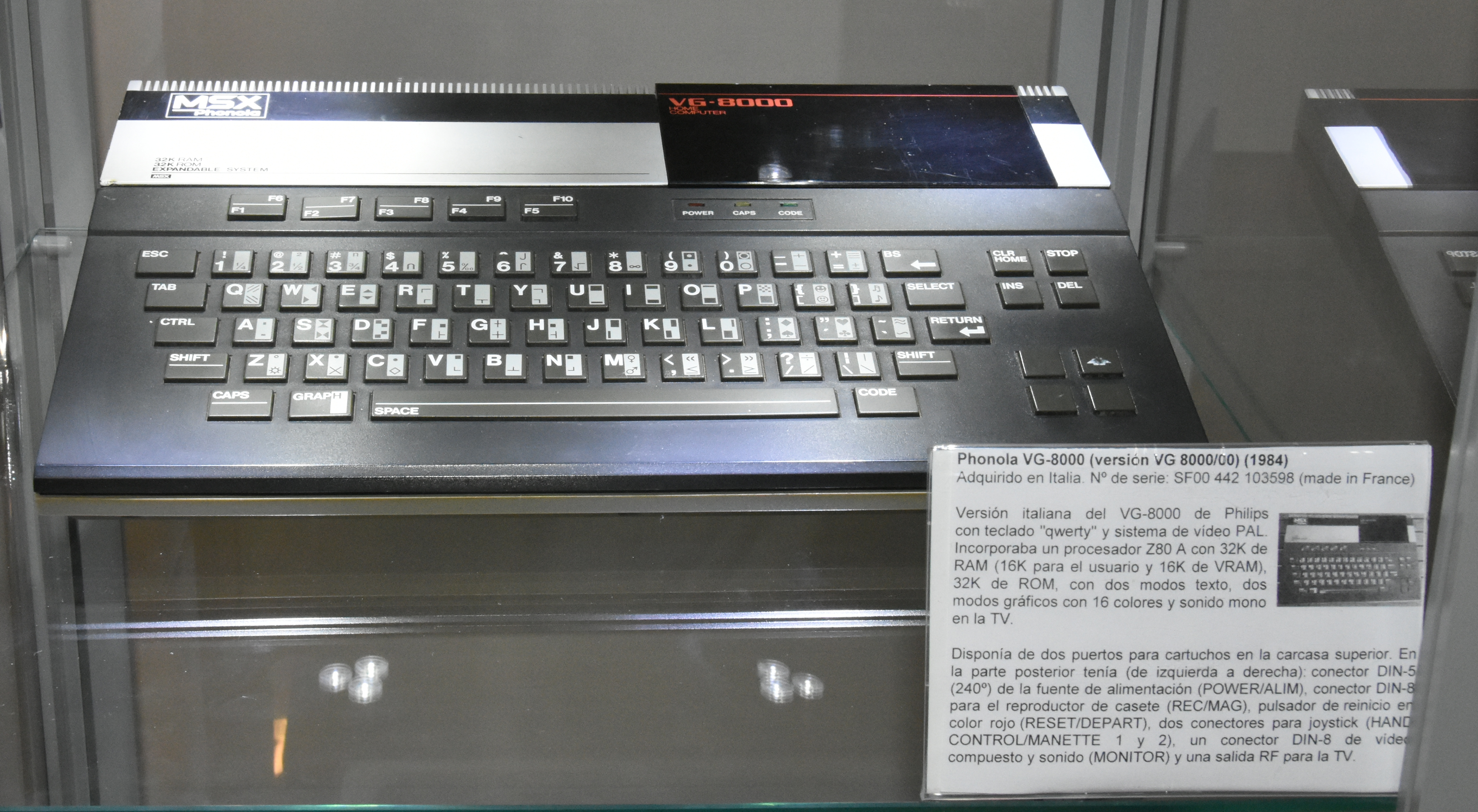
Phonola VG-8000

The Philips VG-8000, released in 1983, was the first Philips MSX computer, although it was not 100% compliant with the standard (as it lacked a Centronics printer port, expansion bus, or audio out, and had a custom video out).

The VG-8000 was built in France, at Le Mans by Radiotechnique. It was released in Belgium, Finland, Germany, and Italy (as the Phonola VG-8000).

The computer had a poor chiclet type keyboard, with two cartridge ports above it. The keyboard layout was qwerty or azerty, according to the market the computer was sold. It had five double function keys (F1 to F10) on top, and four arrow keys on the right. There were three color LEDs: Power (red), Caps (orange) and Code (green).

There were three versions of this machine:

- VG-8000/00, with qwerty keyboard and PAL composite video output;
- VG-8000/19, with azerty keyboard and RGB video output (planned but never released according to service manual);
- VG-8000/20, with qwerty keyboard and RGB video output.

The machine was expensive and not successful.

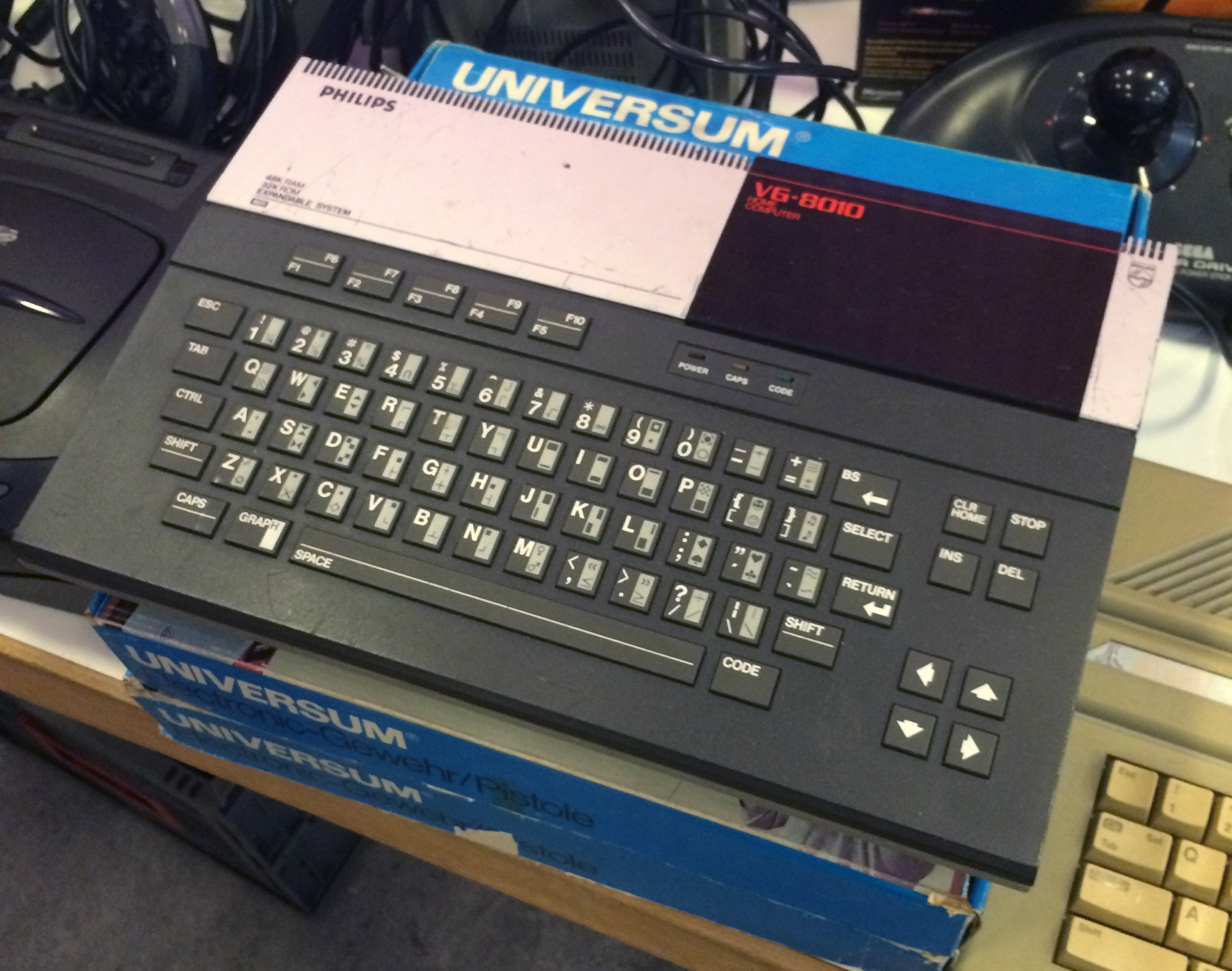
Philips VG-8010

== Philips VG 8010 ==
The VG-8010, released in January 1984, was a more advanced model with 32 KB of RAM and popular in the Netherlands.

It was built in France, at Le Mans by Radiotechnique, with a retail price of 2290 Fr in September 1985. It was sold in Italy as the Phonola VG-8010.

There were two versions of this machine:

- VG-8010/00, with qwerty keyboard and PAL composite video output;
- VG-8010/19, with azerty keyboard and RGB video output.

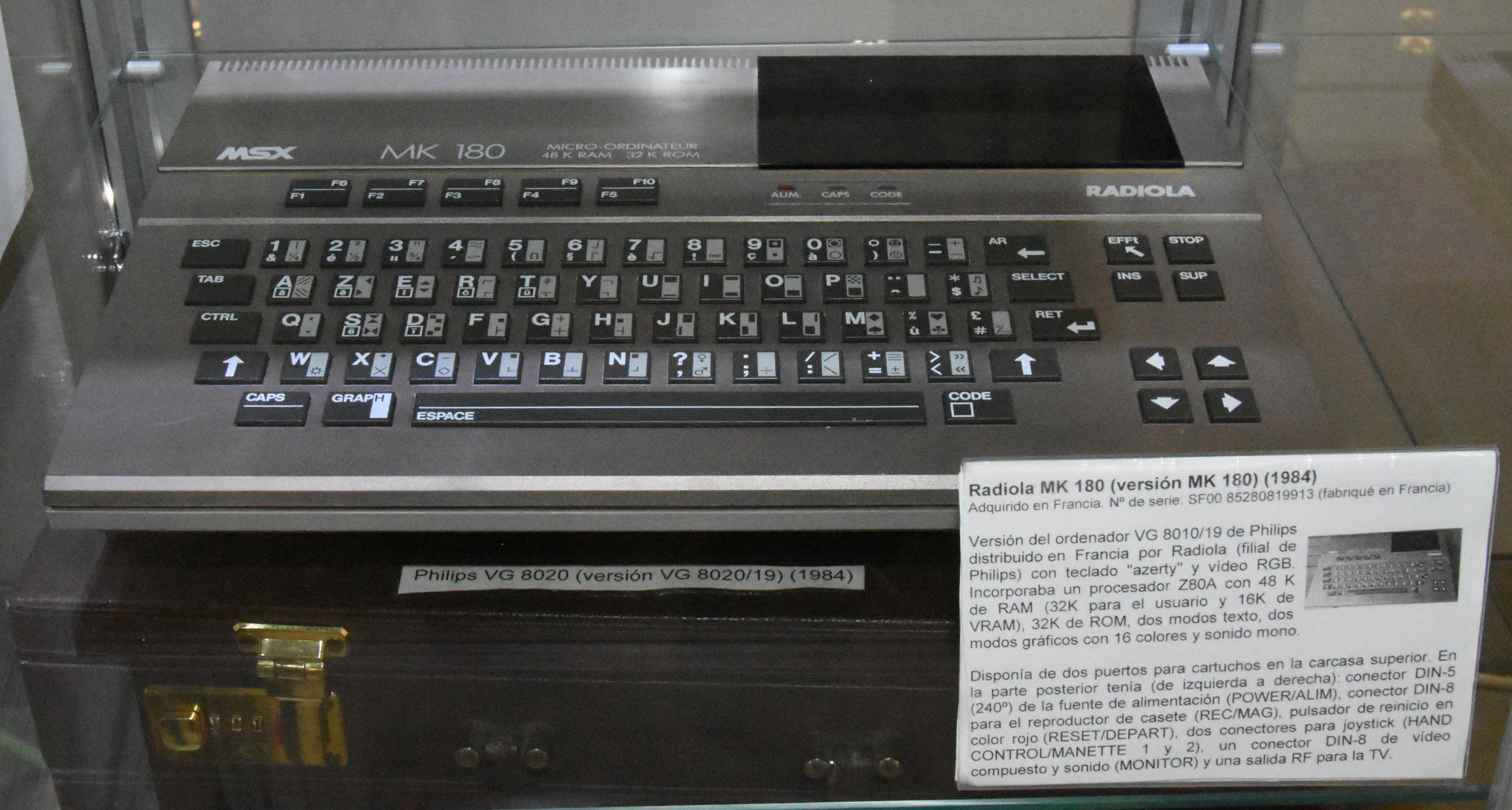
Radiola MK-180

Besides the mentioned Phonola branding, these machines were also sold under the Schneider and Radiola brands:

- Schneider MC 810, with 48K RAM, azerty keyboard and RGB video output;
- Radiola MK 180, with 48K RAM, azerty keyboard and RGB video output.

The VG-8010 was replaced with the Philips VG-8020, a more advanced machine.

== Specifications ==
- Z80A processor running at 3.58 MHz
- RAM: 16 KB (VG-8000), 32 KB (VG-8010), 48 KB (MC 810 and MK 180)
- ROM: 32 KB (MSX BASIC V1.0)
- Video processor: TMS9918
- Sound: AY-3-8910
- Ports: two cartridge slots, tape-recorder connector, RGB video output, two joystick sockets
