= Philips VG-8020 =

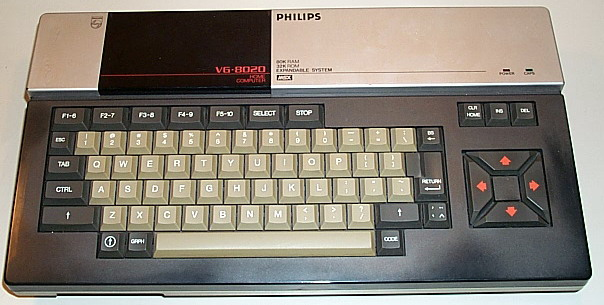
- Developer: Philips
- Manufacturer: Kyocera
- Type: home computer
- Released: 1984
- Operating system: MSX BASIC 1.0
- CPU: Zilog Z80A @ 3.56 MHz
- Memory: 64 KB
- Removable storage: data recorder, cartridge
- Display: RF output, CVBS: 256 × 192 pixels, 16 colors
- Graphics: TMS9929A
- Sound: AY-3-8910
- Controller input: Joystick
- Backward compatibility: MSX1
- Predecessor: Philips VG-8010
- Successor: Philips NMS 8220

The VG-8020 was Philips' third MSX computer introduced in 1984, after the VG-8000 and the VG-8010 computers.

With a price of 2990 Fr, the machine was MSX1 standard compatible, had a real keyboard (instead of a chiclet keyboard like its predecessors) and a printer port (missing on the previous models).

The VG-8020 was manufactured by Kyocera and featured a Zilog Z80A microprocessor clocked at 3.56 MHz, 64KB of RAM, 16KB of VRAM, two cartridge slots and two joystick ports.

The machine came with MSX BASIC 1.0 in ROM and graphics were provided by a Texas Instruments TMS9929A, with RF and composite video outputs. Sound was generated by a General Instruments AY-3-8910 chip.

It was replaced by the Philips NMS 8220, a MSX2 compatible machine.

== Models ==
The computer was marketed in several variants:

- Philips VG-8020/00 (PAL, QWERTY keyboard, 1984)
- Philips VG-8020/19 (SECAM, AZERTY keyboard, RGB out, black case, France, 1985)
- Philips VG-8020/20 (PAL, QWERTY keyboard layout, revised motherboard, 1986)
- Philips VG-8020/29 (Germany, 1986)
- Philips VG-8020/40 (revised motherboard)
- Phonola VG 8020 (Italy)

== Gallery ==
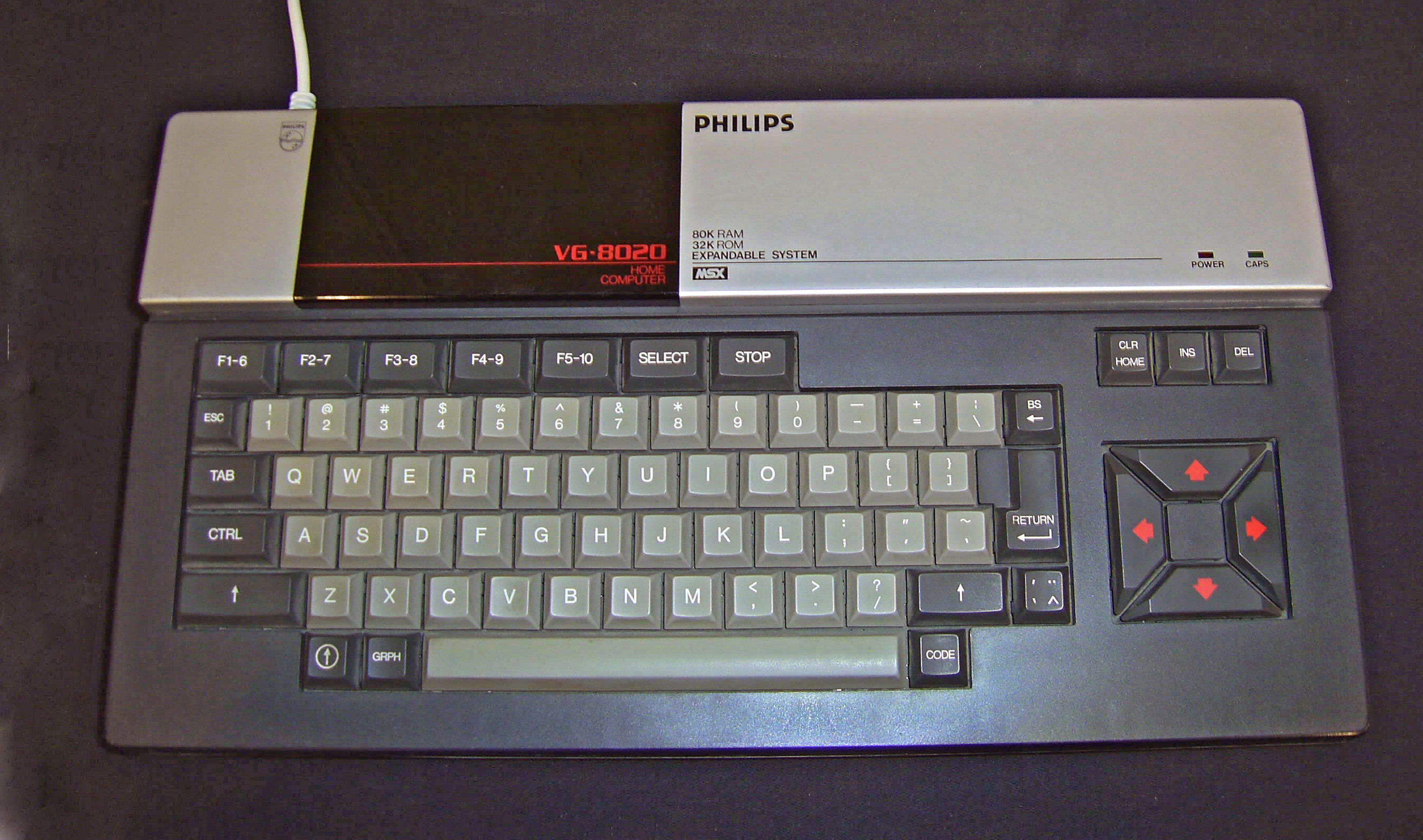
Philips VG-8020

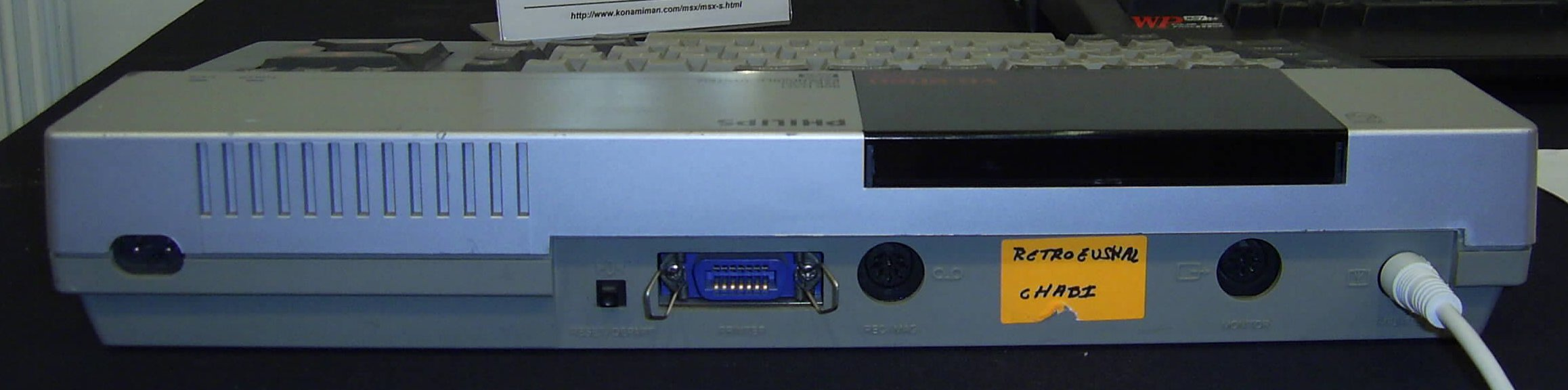
VG-8020 back connectors

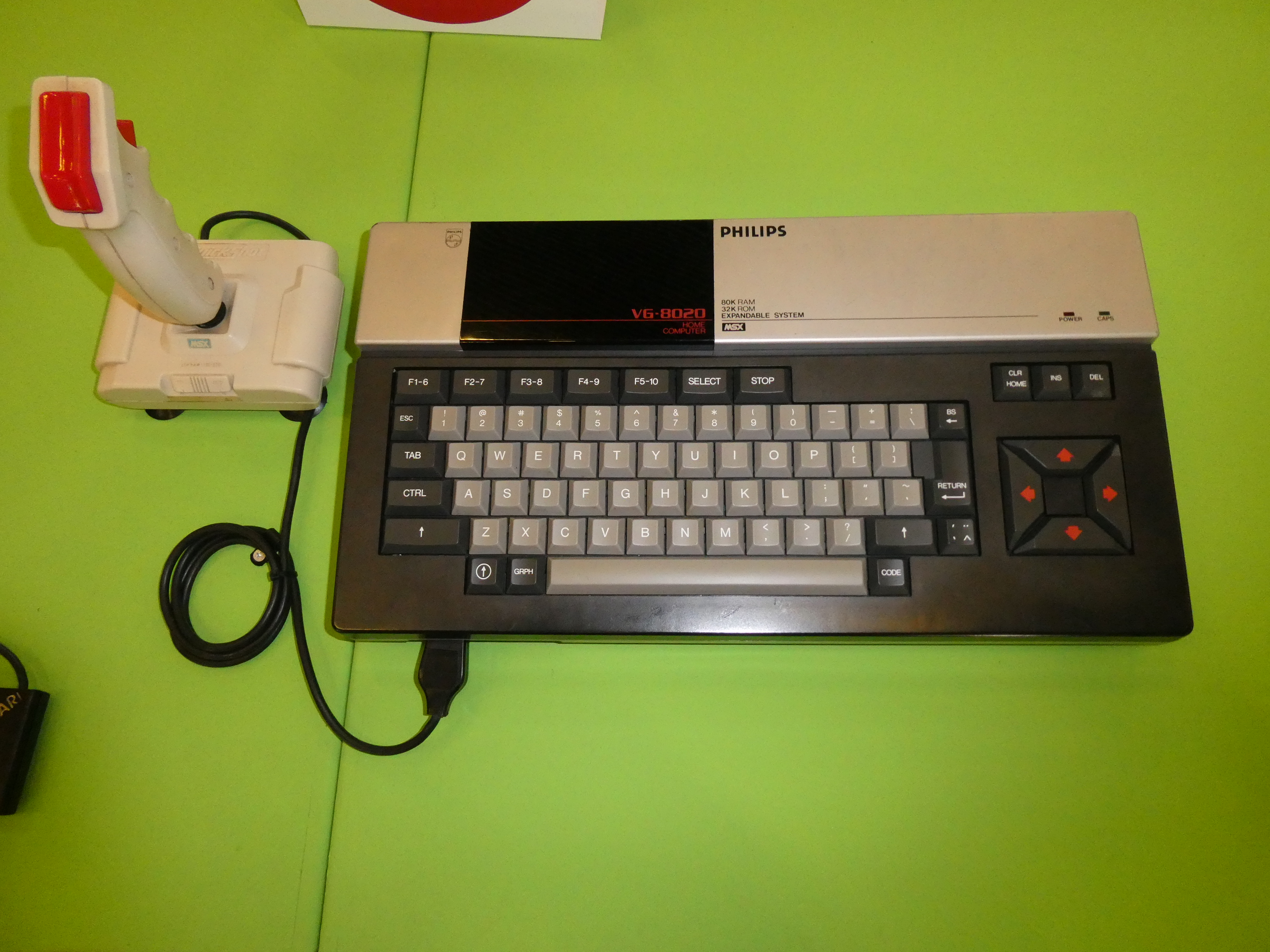
Philips VG-8020 with joystick

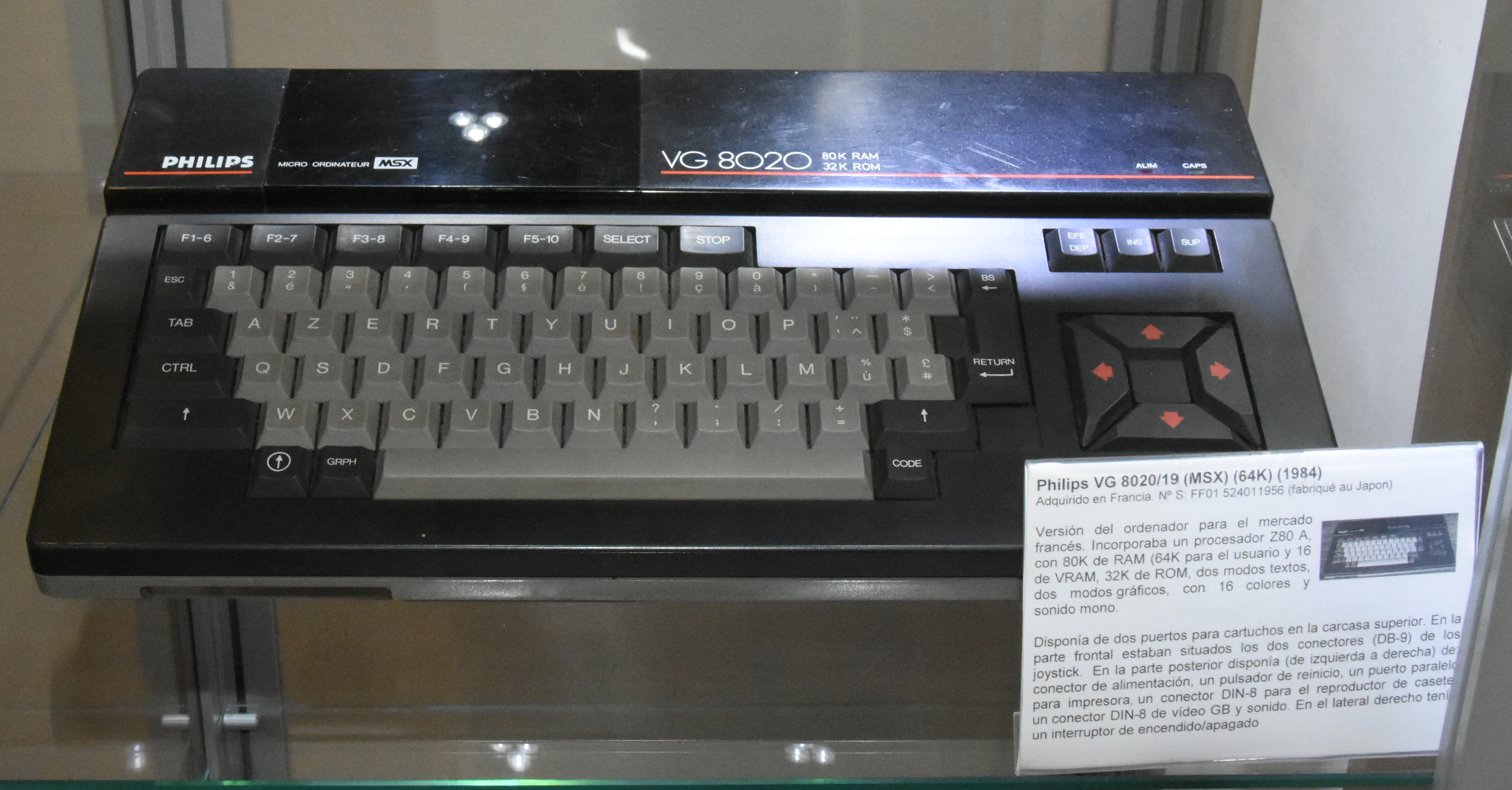
Philips VG 8020/19

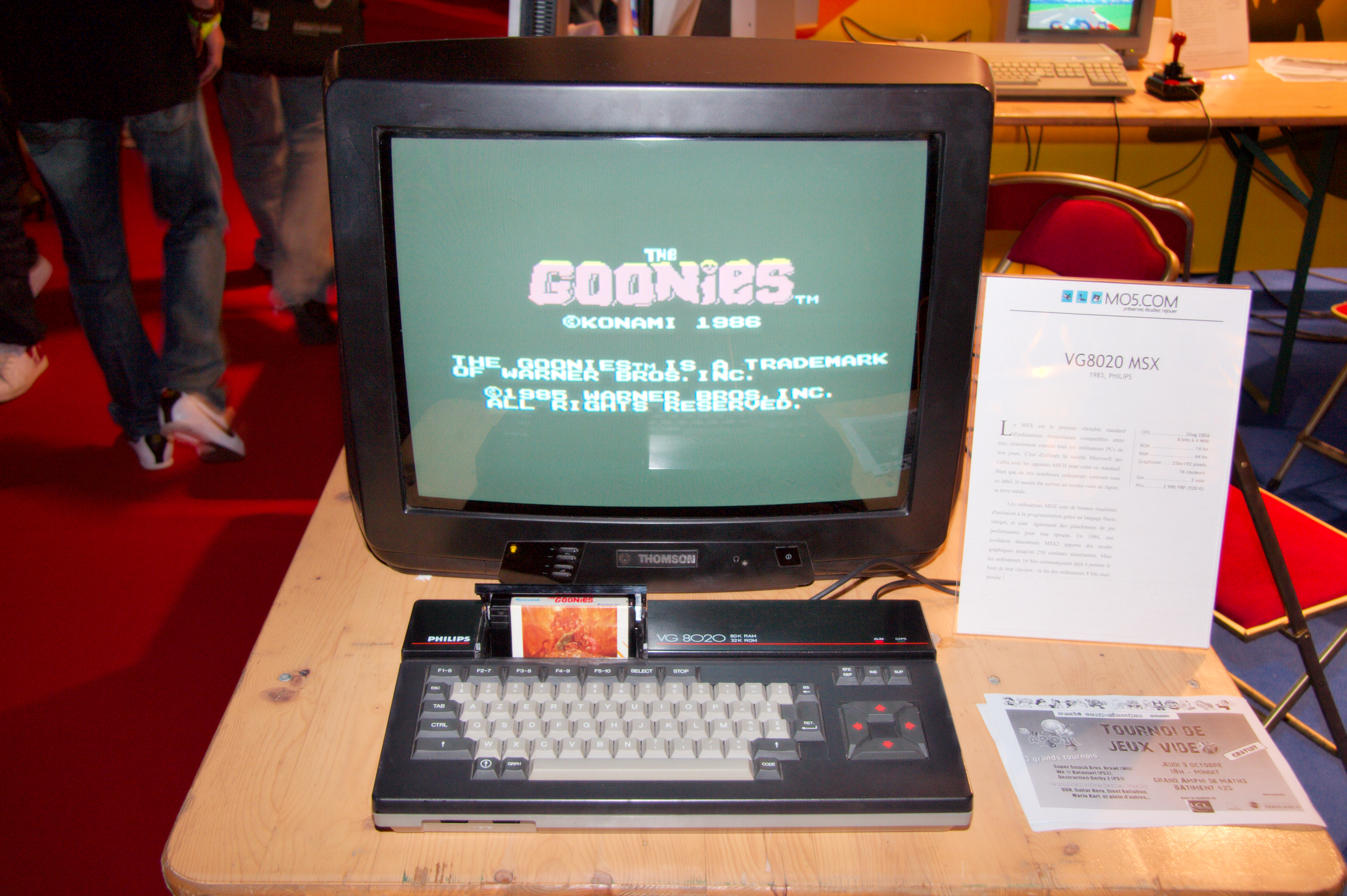
Title screen of The Goonies in a VG 8020/19
