= Yamaha V9938 =

Video display processor

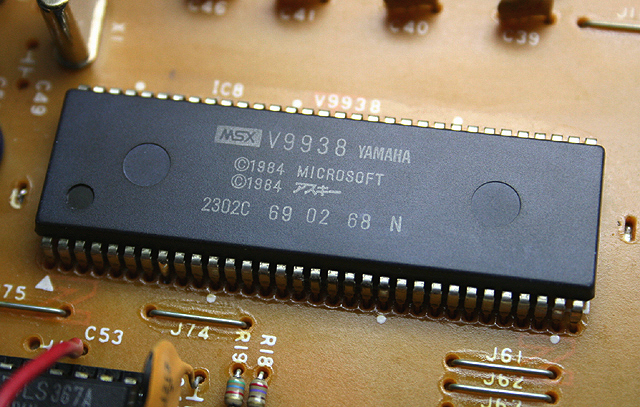
Yamaha V9938 in an MSX2

The Yamaha V9938, also known as MSX-Video or VDP (Video Display Processor), is a video display processor (VDP) used on the MSX2 home computer, as well as on the Geneve 9640 enhanced TI-99/4A clone, and the Tatung Einstein 256. It was also used in a few MSX1 computers, in a configuration with 16kB VRAM. It was also used in the Zemmix Super V console, as well as the Spectravideo SVI-838.

The Yamaha V9938 is the successor of the Texas Instruments TMS9918 used in the MSX1 and other systems. The V9938 was in turn succeeded by the Yamaha V9958.

== Specifications ==
- Video RAM: 16–192 KB
- Text modes: 80 × 24, 40 × 24 and 32 × 24
- Resolution: 512 × 212 (16 colors from 512), 256 × 212 (16 colors from 512) and 256 × 212 (256 colors)
- Sprites: 32, 16 colors, max 8 per horizontal line
- Hardware acceleration for copy, line, fill and logical operations available
- Interlacing to double vertical resolution
- Vertical scroll register

=== Detailed specifications ===
- Video RAM: 4 possible configurations
  - 16 KB (modes G4 up to G7 will not be available)
  - 64 KB (modes G6 and G7 will not be available)
  - 128 KB: most common configuration
  - 192 KB, where 64 KB is extended-VRAM (only available as back-buffer for G4 and G5 modes)
- Clock: 21 MHz
- Video output frequency: 15 kHz
- Color encoding: Software switchable between 50 Hz and 60 Hz modes
- Sprites: 32, 16 colors (1 per line. 3, 7 or 15 colors/line by using the CC attribute), max 8 per horizontal line
- Hardware acceleration, with copy, line, fill etc. With or without logical operations.
- Vertical scroll register
- Capable of superimposition and digitization
- Support for connecting a lightpen and a mouse
- Resolution:
  - Horizontal: 256 or 512
  - Vertical: 192p, 212p, 384i or 424i
- Color modes:
  - Paletted RGB: 16 colors out of 512 (9-bit RGB)
  - Fixed RGB: 256 colors (3-3-2 bit RGB)
- Screen modes
  - Text modes:
    - T1: 40 × 24 with 2 colors (out of 512)
    - T2: 80 × 24 with 4 colors (out of 512)
    - All text modes can have 26.5 rows as well.
  - Pattern modes
    - G1: 256 × 192 with 16 paletted colors and 1 table of 8×8 patterns
    - G2: 256 × 192 with 16 paletted colors and 3 tables of 8×8 patterns
    - G3: 256 × 192 with 16 paletted colors and 3 tables of 8×8 patterns
    - MC: 64 × 48 with 16 paletted colors and 8×2 patterns
    - All modes with 192 lines can have 212 lines as well (similarly 48 → 53 in MC)
  - Bitmap modes:
    - G4: 256 × 212 with 16 paletted colors
    - G5: 512 × 212 with 4 paletted colors
    - G6: 512 × 212 with 16 paletted colors
    - G7: 256 × 212 with 256 fixed-colors
    - All modes with 212 lines can have 192 lines as well (similarly 48 → 53 in MC)
    - All vertical resolutions can be doubled by interlacing

== MSX-specific terminology ==
On MSX, the screen modes are often referred to by their assigned number in MSX-Basic. This mapping is as follows:

| Basic mode | VDP mode | MSX system |
|---|---|---|
| Screen 0 (width 40) | T1 | MSX 1 |
| Screen 0 (width 80) | T2 | MSX 2 |
| Screen 1 | G1 | MSX 1 |
| Screen 2 | G2 | MSX 1 |
| Screen 3 | MC | MSX 1 |
| Screen 4 | G3 | MSX 2 |
| Screen 5 | G4 | MSX 2 |
| Screen 6 | G5 | MSX 2 |
| Screen 7 | G6 | MSX 2 |
| Screen 8 | G7 | MSX 2 |

Note: Screen 9 was reserved for South Korean MSX2 units.

== See also ==
- Texas Instruments TMS9918
- Yamaha V9958
