= MSX BASIC =

Programming language dialect

- Paradigm: imperative
- Developer: Microsoft Corporation
- First appeared: 1983; 43 years ago
- Stable release: 4.1
- OS: Optional; Any suitable OS is O.K.
- License: MS-EULA
- Website: www.microsoft.com

Influenced by
- GW-BASIC

Influenced
- Vilnius BASIC

MSX BASIC is a dialect of the BASIC programming language. It is an extended version of Microsoft's MBASIC Version 4.5, adding support for graphic, music, and various peripherals attached to MSX microcomputers. Generally, MSX BASIC is designed to follow GW-BASIC, released the same year for IBM PCs and clones. During the creation of MSX BASIC, effort was made to make the system flexible and expandable.

== Distribution ==
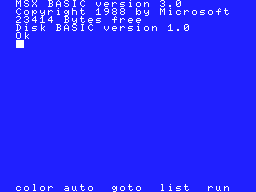
MSX BASIC version 3.0

MSX BASIC came bundled in the ROM of all MSX computers. At system start-up MSX BASIC is invoked, causing its command prompt to be displayed, unless other software placed in ROM takes control (which is the typical case of game cartridges and disk interfaces, the latter causing the MSX-DOS prompt to be shown if there is a disk present which contains the DOS system files).

When MSX BASIC is invoked, the ROM code for BIOS and the BASIC interpreter itself are visible on the lower 32K of the Z80 addressing space. The upper 32K are set to RAM, of which about 23K to 28K are available for BASIC code and data (the exact amount depends on the presence of disk controller and on the MSX-DOS kernel version).

== Development Environment ==
MSX BASIC development environment is very similar to other versions of Microsoft BASIC. It has a command line-based Integrated Development Environment (IDE) system; all program lines must be numbered, all non-numbered lines are considered to be commands in direct mode (i.e., to be executed immediately). The user interface is entirely command-line-based.

== Versions of MSX BASIC ==
Every new version of the MSX computer was bundled with an updated version of MSX BASIC. All versions are backward compatible and provide new capabilities to fully explore the new and extended hardware found on the newer MSX computers.

=== MSX BASIC 1.0 ===
- Bundled with MSX1 computers
- 16 KB in size
- No native support for floppy disk requiring the Disk BASIC cartridge extension (4 KB overhead)
- Support for all available screen modes:
  - Screen 0 (text mode 40 × 24 characters)
  - Screen 1 (mixed text mode 32 × 24 characters, sprites and colored custom characters)
  - Screen 2 (high-resolution graphic mode 256 × 192 pixels, 16 colors)
  - Screen 3 (low-resolution graphic mode 64×48 – 4×4 pixel blocks over the screen 2 resolution)
- Full support for hardware sprites and interrupt-driven automatic collision detection
- Full support for the General Instruments AY-3-8910 Programmable Sound Generator (PSG)

Note that the Brazilian MSX "clones" by Sharp and Gradiente show other versions of MSX BASIC (on the Sharps even called HOT-BASIC), but they're basically just unlicensed MSX BASIC 1.0.

=== MSX BASIC 2.0 / 2.1 ===
- Bundled with MSX2 computers
- 32 KB in size (First 16 KB directly available, second 16 KB in other slot and has to be paged in/out for usage)
- Added support for new available screen modes, including graphic modes with 212 progressive or 424 interlaced lines:
  - Updated Screen 0 (text mode 80 × 24)
  - Screen 5 (graphic mode 256 × 212/424 pixels, 16 colors out of 512)
  - Screen 6 (graphic mode 512 × 212/424 pixels, 4 colors out of 512)
  - Screen 7 (graphic mode 512 × 212/424 pixels, 16 colors out of 512)
  - Screen 8 (graphic mode 256 × 212/424 pixels, 256 colors, no palette)
- Added support for multicolored sprites (16 colors)
- Added support for hardware accelerated graphics functions (copy, fill, blitting, etc.)
- Added support for using the lower 32K RAM of the computer (not directly visible because the BIOS and BASIC interpreter ROMs take over the addressing space) as a limited RAM disk (only certain types of files could be saved). MSX BASIC 2.1 supports using the memory mapper (if available on the machine) to expand this RAM disk to almost 90 KB.

MSX BASIC 2.1 exists on computers like the Philips MSX2 machines (except for the VG 8230), the Yamaha YIS-805 and Sanyo MPC-2300.

=== MSX BASIC 3.0 ===
- Bundled with MSX2+ computers
- 32 KB in size (First 16 KB directly available, second 16 KB in other slot and has to be paged in/out for usage)
- Added command SET SCROLL for smooth, hardware based scrolling in BASIC
- Added support for new available screen modes:
  - Screen 10 (graphic mode 256 × 212/424 pixels, 12499 YJK at once + 16 colors out of 512 RGB in ML)
  - Screen 11 (graphic mode 256 × 212/424 pixels, 12499 YJK at once + 16 colors out of 512 RGB)
  - Screen 12 (graphic mode 256 × 212/424 pixels, 19268 YJK at once)

=== MSX BASIC 4.0 ===
- Bundled with the Panasonic FS-A1ST MSX turbo R model
- Added _PAUSE command to make delays in BASIC independent of the current CPU and clock
- Added extra commands for the PCM device (_PCMPLAY, _PCMREC)

=== MSX BASIC 4.1 ===
- Bundled with the Panasonic FS-A1GT MSX turbo R model
- Added MIDI extensions

== Sample ==
100 OPEN "COM5:9600,N,8,1,RS,CS,DS,CD" FOR RANDOM AS #1
110 A$=INKEY$
120 IF A$<>" " THEN 110
130 PRINT #1, "X0"
140 INPUT #1, B$
150 PRINT B$
160 GOTO 110

== Extensions of MSX BASIC ==
Since MSX BASIC was meant to be expandable from inception, it was possible to write add-on modules quite easily. Support for specific hardware was commonly added by means of expansion cartridges, which also served as the interface to the hardware in question. MSX Disk-BASIC is an example, bundled in the cartridge that provides the hardware interface to the disk drives, it adds commands to access the floppy disk drives.
