= 1985 in video games =

1985 saw many sequels and prequels in video games, such as Super Mario Bros. and Kung Fu, along with new titles such as Commando, Duck Hunt, Gauntlet, Ghosts 'n Goblins, Gradius, Hang-On, Space Harrier, Tetris and The Way of the Exploding Fist. The year's highest-grossing arcade video games were Hang-On and Karate Champ in the United States, and Commando in the United Kingdom. The year's best‑selling home system was the Nintendo Entertainment System (Famicom) for a consecutive year, while the year's best‑selling home video game was Super Mario Bros.

== Financial performance ==
In the United States, annual home video game sales fell to $100 million ($300 million adjusted for inflation) in 1985. Meanwhile, the arcade video game industry began recovering in 1985.

=== Highest-grossing arcade games ===
==== Japan ====
In Japan, the following titles were the top-grossing arcade video games on the bi-weekly Game Machine charts in 1985.

Month	Table arcade cabinet		Upright/cockpit arcade cabinet		Ref
Month	Title	Points	Title	Points	Ref
January	Spartan X (Kung-Fu Master)	17.39	TX-1 V8	16.1	
February	Spartan X (Kung-Fu Master)	14.61	TX-1 V8	15	
March	Samurai Nipponichi	16.22	TX-1 V8	13.13	
April	Return of the Invaders	13.26	TX-1 V8	14.84	
May	I'm Sorry	14.58	TX-1 V8	14.43	
June	Senjō no Ōkami (Commando)	14.55	Wyvern F-0	16.07	
July	Ping Pong King	16.22	TX-1 V8	14.96	
August	Sandlot Baseball	16.56	Hang-On	28.28	
September	Sandlot Baseball	13.91	Hang-On	37.96	
October	Exciting Hour	15.39	Hang-On	37.05	
November	Choplifter	15.59	Hang-On	35.58	
December	ASO: Armored Scrum Object	14.1	Hang-On	33.8	

==== United Kingdom and United States ====
In the United Kingdom and United States, the following titles were the highest-grossing arcade games of 1985.

Rank	United Kingdom	United States					
Rank	United Kingdom	Play Meter	RePlay		AMOA		
Rank	United Kingdom	Play Meter	Title	Type	Arcade	Route/Street	Video
1	Commando	Hang-On	Karate Champ	Dedicated	Nintendo VS. System	Karate Champ	Spy Hunter
2	Unknown	Unknown	Kung-Fu Master	Dedicated	Kung-Fu Master, Karate Champ, Pac-Land, Pole Position II	English Mark Darts, Crowns Golf, Yie Ar Kung-Fu, Kung-Fu Master	Kung-Fu Master, Pole Position, Trivia Master, Karate Champ
3	Unknown	Unknown	Commando	Dedicated	Kung-Fu Master, Karate Champ, Pac-Land, Pole Position II	English Mark Darts, Crowns Golf, Yie Ar Kung-Fu, Kung-Fu Master	Kung-Fu Master, Pole Position, Trivia Master, Karate Champ
4	Unknown	Unknown	Yie Ar Kung-Fu	Conversion	Kung-Fu Master, Karate Champ, Pac-Land, Pole Position II	English Mark Darts, Crowns Golf, Yie Ar Kung-Fu, Kung-Fu Master	Kung-Fu Master, Pole Position, Trivia Master, Karate Champ
5	Unknown	Unknown	Hogan's Alley	System	Kung-Fu Master, Karate Champ, Pac-Land, Pole Position II	English Mark Darts, Crowns Golf, Yie Ar Kung-Fu, Kung-Fu Master	Kung-Fu Master, Pole Position, Trivia Master, Karate Champ
6	Unknown	Unknown	Excitebike	System	Unknown		
7	Unknown	Unknown	Pole Position, Spy Hunter	Dedicated	Unknown		
8	Unknown	Unknown	Pole Position, Spy Hunter	Dedicated	Unknown		

=== Best-selling home systems ===
Rank	System(s)	Manufacturer	Type	Generation	Sales			
Rank	System(s)	Manufacturer	Type	Generation	Japan	USA	UK	Worldwide
1	Nintendo Entertainment System / Famicom	Nintendo	Console	Third	6,500,000	90,000	—N/a	6,590,000
2	Commodore 64 (C64)	Commodore	Computer	8-bit	Unknown	1,000,000	Unknown	2,500,000
3	IBM Personal Computer (PC) / IBM PCjr	IBM	Computer	8-bit / 16-bit	—N/a	—N/a	—N/a	1,400,000
4	Atari 2600	Atari	Console	Second	—N/a	—N/a	—N/a	1,000,000
5	Apple II	Apple Inc.	Computer	8-bit	—N/a	—N/a	—N/a	900,000
6	Commodore 128	Commodore	Computer	8-bit	—N/a	—N/a	—N/a	500,000
7	NEC PC-88 / PC-98	NEC	Computer	8-bit / 16-bit	430,000	Unknown	Unknown	430,000+
8	ZX Spectrum	Sinclair	Computer	8-bit	—N/a	Unknown	390,000	390,000+
9	Sega SG-1000 / Mark III (Master System)	Sega	Console	Third	280,000	—N/a	—N/a	280,000+
10	Amstrad CPC / Amstrad PCW	Amstrad	Computer	8-bit	—N/a	Unknown	250,000	250,000+

=== Best-selling home video games ===
==== Japan ====
The year's best-selling game was Super Mario Bros. for the Family Computer (Famicom), later known as the Nintendo Entertainment System (NES) outside Japan. The game sold 2.5 million copies and grossed more than ¥12.2 billion ($72 million at the time, or $216 million adjusted for inflation) within several months. It eventually sold 3 million cartridges by the end of 1985.

Game Machine magazine reported that more than ten Famicom games released between 1983 and 1985 had each sold over 1 million cartridges in Japan by the end of 1985. The Magic Box lists fourteen Famicom games released between 1983 and 1985 that crossed 1 million lifetime sales in Japan. At least 11 of the following 14 Famicom million-sellers released between 1983 and 1985 crossed 1 million sales in Japan by the end of 1985.

Title(s)		Publisher	Sales	Ref
Super Mario Bros.		Nintendo	3,000,000	
4 Nin Uchi Mahjong	Baseball	Nintendo	Unknown	
Excitebike	F1 Race	Nintendo	Unknown	
Golf	Kung Fu	Nintendo	Unknown	
Mahjong	Mario Bros.	Nintendo	Unknown	
Soccer	Tennis	Nintendo	Unknown	
Kinnikuman: Muscle Tag Match		Bandai	Unknown	
Xevious		Namco	Unknown	
Lode Runner		Hudson Soft	Unknown	

==== United Kingdom ====
In the United Kingdom, the following titles were the top ten best-selling home video games of 1985, according to the annual Gallup software sales chart. The top ten titles were all home computer games.

Rank	Title	Developer	Publisher	Genre	Sales
1	The Way of the Exploding Fist	Beam Software	Melbourne House	Fighting	500,000 (Europe)
2	Soft Aid	Various	Quicksilva	Compilation	Unknown
3	Elite	Acornsoft	Acornsoft	Space trading	Unknown
4	Ghostbusters	Activision	Activision	Action	Unknown
5	Finders Keepers	Mastertronic	Mastertronic	Platformer	Unknown
6	Frank Bruno's Boxing	Elite Systems	Elite Systems	Fighting (boxing)	Unknown
7	Commando	Capcom	Elite Systems	Run-and-gun shooter	Unknown
8	Formula 1 Simulator	Spirit Software	Mastertronic	Racing	Unknown
9	Daley Thompson's Decathlon	Ocean Software	Ocean Software	Sports (Olympics)	Unknown
10	Impossible Mission	Epyx	U.S. Gold	Platformer	Unknown

Fighting games topped the UK software sales charts for two years in a row in the mid-1980s, with The Way of the Exploding Fist in 1985 and then the home computer conversions of Yie Ar Kung-Fu in 1986.

==== United States ====
In the United States, the Software Publishers Association (SPA) began tracking home computer game sales in 1985. The following fourteen computer games received Gold Awards from the SPA for sales above 100,000 units in 1985 (but below the 250,000 units required for a Platinum Award).

Titles		Ref
Alphabet Zoo	Choplifter	
Deadline	F-15 Strike Eagle	
Fraction Fever	Frogger	
Ghostbusters	Kids on Keys	
Lode Runner	Math Blaster!	
The Hitchhiker's Guide to the Galaxy		
Zork I	Zork II	
Zork III	—N/a	

== Events ==
- August – The final issue of Electronic Games magazine is published.

=== Major awards ===
- The Way of the Exploding Fist won Game of the Year at the third Golden Joystick Awards (for best home computer game), and received the "Voted Best Game" award at the Saturday Superstore Viewer Awards.
- The sixth Arcade Awards are held, for games released during 1983–1984, with Star Wars winning best arcade game, Space Shuttle best console game, Ultima III: Exodus best computer game, and Zaxxon best standalone game.
- In Computer Gamer magazine's Game of the Year Awards, Elite won best home computer game of the year (with The Way of the Exploding Fist as runner-up) and Commando won best coin-op game (with Paperboy as runner-up).

== Business ==
- New companies: Cinemaware. Codemasters, Square Co., Titus, Tradewest, Westwood Studios
- Defunct: Adventure International, Bug-Byte, Edu-Ware, RDI Video Systems
- David Mullich and several other laid-off employees from Edu-Ware form Electric Transit, the first company to join Electronic Arts' new affiliated publisher program.

== Games released in 1985 ==
Video game platforms
Arcade	Arcade video game	APPII	Apple II	ATR	Atari 8-bit computers
ATR26	Atari 2600, Atari 2800	C64	Commodore 64	CPC	Amstrad CPC
FM7	FM-7	INT	Intellivision	MSX	MSX
NES	Nintendo Entertainment System / Famicom	PC80	PC-8000 series	PC88	PC-8800 series
PC98	PC-9800 series	SG1K	SG-1000	SMS	Master System
TEIN	Tatung Einstein	X1	Sharp X1	ZX	ZX Spectrum

Release date	Title	Platform	Developer / Publisher	Ref.
January 30	Ice Climber (JP)	NES		
January	Yie Ar Kung-Fu	Arcade	Konami	
February 4	Ice Climber (JP)	Arcade		
March 1	Hogan's Alley (JP)	Arcade		
March	Excitebike (NA)	Arcade		
March	Gridiron Fight	Arcade	Tehkan	
March	Ice Climber (NA)	Arcade		
March	Kung Fu (NA)	Arcade		
April 9	Soccer (JP)	NES		
April 23	Where in the World is Carmen Sandiego?			
April	Hogan's Alley (NA)	Arcade		
April	Paperboy	Arcade	Atari Games	
April	Racing Destruction Set (NA)	C64		
April	Thexder (JP)	PC88		
April	Karuizawa Yūkai Annai	PC88	Enix	
May	Commando	Arcade	Capcom	
May	Gradius (JP)	Arcade	Konami	
May	Metro-Cross	Arcade	Namco	
June 18	Wrecking Crew (JP)	NES		
June 21	Kung Fu (JP)	NES		
June	Thexder (JP)	PC80		
July	Baraduke (JP)	Arcade	Namco	
July	Hang-On	Arcade	Sega, Sega AM2	
August	Hogan's Alley (EU)	Arcade		
August	Indiana Jones and the Temple of Doom	Arcade	Atari Games	
August	Racing Destruction Set (UK)	C64		
September	Return of the Invaders	Arcade	Taito, UPL	
September 9	Battle City (JP)	NES		
September 13	Super Mario Bros. (JP)	NES		
September 16	Ultima IV: Quest of the Avatar (NA)	APPII		
September 19	Ghosts 'n Goblins	Arcade	Capcom	
September 20	Motos	Arcade	Namco	
October 18	10-Yard Fight	NES		
October 18	Baseball	NES		
October 18	Clu Clu Land	NES, Arcade		
October 18	Duck Hunt (NA)	NES		
October 18	Excitebike (NA)	NES		
October 18	Golf (NA/EU)	NA: NES; EU: Arcade		
October 18	Gyromite	NES		
October 18	Hogan's Alley (NA)	NES		
October 18	Ice Climber (NA)	NES		
October 18	Kung Fu (NA)	NES		
October 18	Pinball (NA)	NES		
October 18	Soccer (NA)	NES		
October 18	Stack-Up	NES		
October 18	Super Mario Bros. (NA)	NES		
October 18	Tennis (NA)	NES		
October 18	Wild Gunman (NA)	NES		
October 18	Wrecking Crew (NA)	NES		
October 27	Xanadu: Dragon Slayer II (JP)	PC88		
October	Gauntlet	Arcade	Atari Games	
October	Ice Climber	PC88		
October	Thexder (JP)	FM7		
November 3	Xanadu: Dragon Slayer II (JP)	X1		
November 21	Xanadu: Dragon Slayer II (JP)	PC80, PC98		
November	Hydlide II: Shine of Darkness	PC88		
November	Ice Climber	X1		
November	Kung Fu	APPII, C64		
December 19	Thexder (JP)	NES		
December	Sky Kid	Arcade	Namco	
December	Space Harrier	Arcade	Sega, Sega AM2	
1985	At the Gates of Moscow 1941	APPII	Strategic Games Productions	
1985	Clues'o'			
1985	Kung Fu (EU)	Arcade		
1985	Mercenary	ATR		
1985	Roller Coaster	ZX		
1985	Starquake	ATR, C64, CPC, MSX, TEIN, ZX		
1985	Tau Ceti	ZX		
1985	Tehkan World Cup (JP)	Arcade	Tehkan	
1985	Tetris	Electronika 60	Alexei Pajitnov	
1985	The Oregon Trail	APPII		
1985	Thexder (JP)	X1		
1985	Wrecking Crew	Arcade		

== Hardware releases ==
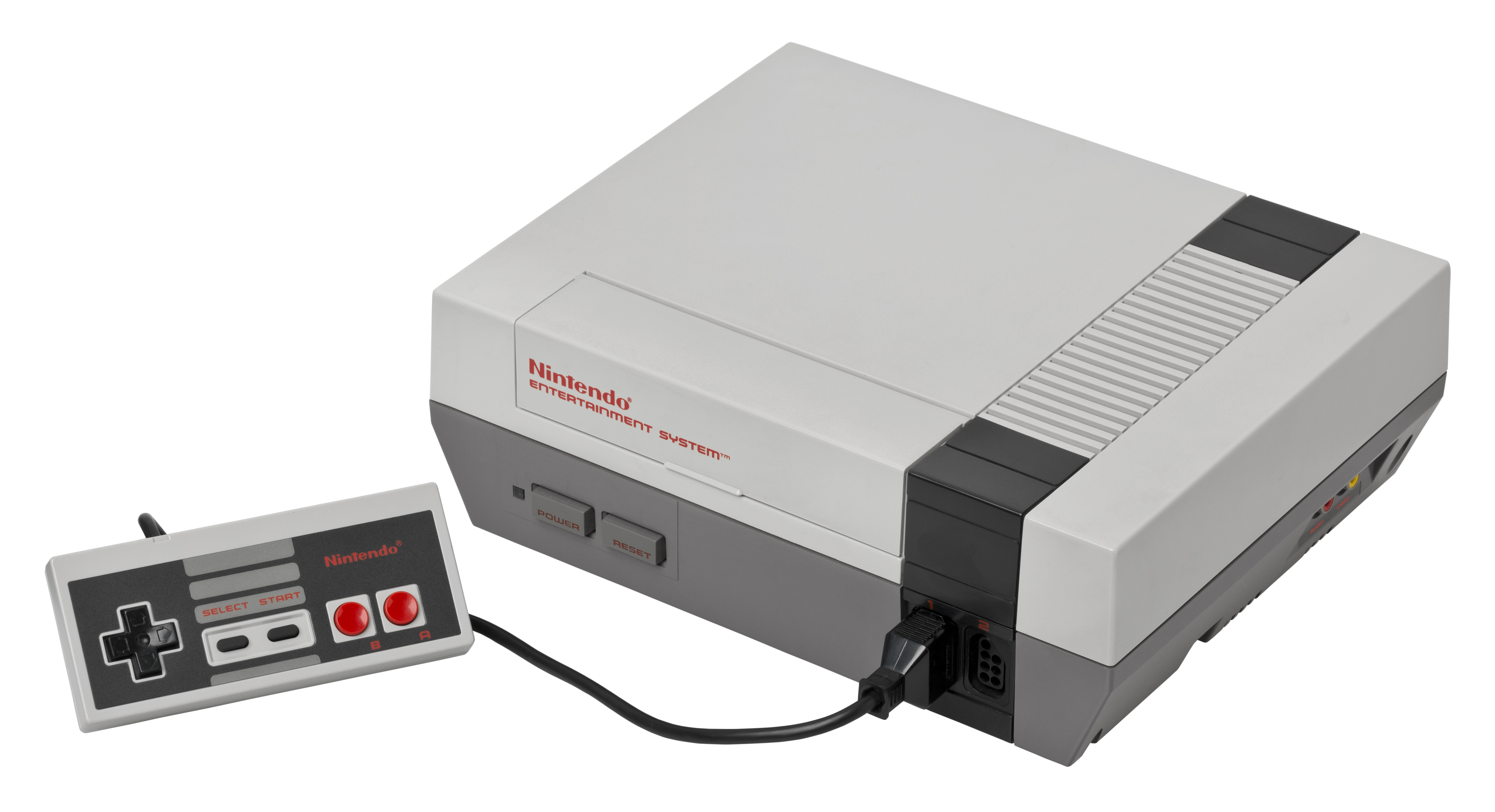
North American release of the Nintendo Entertainment System

=== Arcade ===
- July – Sega releases the Space Harrier arcade hardware (also known as Sega Hang-On), the first of Sega's "Super Scaler" arcade system boards that allow pseudo-3D sprite-scaling at high frame rates. It displays 6144 colors on screen out of a 32,768 color palette.
- Namco begins development on the Namco System 21 around this time, as the first arcade board dedicated to 3D polygon graphics.

=== Computer ===
- January – Commodore releases their final 8-bit computer, the Commodore 128.
- June – Atari Corporation releases the 520ST, the first personal computer with a bit-mapped, color GUI.
- July 23 – Commodore releases the Amiga 1000 personal computer, the first in the Amiga family. It was not widely available until 1986.
- Atari replaces previous models in the Atari 8-bit computer series with the 65XE and 130XE, the latter of which has 128K bank-switched RAM.
- Discontinued: Coleco Adam, VIC-20

=== Console ===
- July 26 – Nintendo releases the Family Computer Robot, a peripheral for their Family Computer (Famicom) home video game console, in Japan.
- October 18 – the Nintendo Entertainment System (NES) home video game console, the export version of the Famicom, is launched for a limited test market in the United States, along with the R.O.B. (Robotic Operating Buddy) peripheral. Not only that Super Mario Bros was released in North America around this time.
- October 20 – the Sega Mark III home video game console is launched in Japan.
- INTV Corporation releases the INTV III console.
- Telegames releases the Dina, a ColecoVision clone.
- Discontinued: ColecoVision

== See also ==
- 1985 in games
