= Programa Educativo de Colegios Secundarios =

Argentine computer

PECOS
- Also known as: Programa Educativo de COlegios Secundarios
- Developer: Asiel
- Manufacturer: Asiel
- Type: Microcomputer
- Released: 1983; 43 years ago
- Units shipped: around 1500
- Operating system: CP/M
- CPU: Zilog Z80 at 4 MHz
- Memory: 64 KB or 128 KB
- Removable storage: floppy disk
- Graphics: TMS9918
- Sound: AY-3-8910 as an optional extension

The PECOS (Programa Educativo de COlegios Secundarios) was an Argentine computer designed and manufactured by Asiel (later renamed Aswork) for educational purposes. Launched in 1983, around 1500 units were produced for schools in Buenos Aires. It became a key development in Argentina's computing industry alongside the Alpha and Sincorp SBX.

Assiel was the first fully integrated computer manufacturer in Argentina, handling the entire process from design to assembly, unlike other companies that assembled imported parts.

The machine was created based on the article Build Your Own Z80 Computer by Steve Ciarcia in Byte magazine.

The PECOS was primarily sold to educational institutions, which were also using Commodore and MSX machines. PECOS computers supported educational networks where teachers controlled student activities via terminal networks. Schools typically installed networks of up to 10 PECOS units, sharing floppy drives and printers, with software developed by Asiel.

== Technical details ==
The PECOS was available in two models: PECOS, a 64 KB RAM version for students; and PRICK, a 128 KB RAM version for teachers.

Powered by a Zilog Z80 microprocessor running at 4 MHz, the system featured an SN76489 audio chip and TMS9928A video controller. The PECOS featured an external power supply, expansion module connectors, and supported optional accessories such as RF modulators and diskette drives.

The operating system used was CP/M, and software included a text editor, spreadsheet, and Micro Logo in Spanish. It also supported multiple programming languages, such as compiled BASIC, Fortran 77, COBOL, and Pascal.
