= TMS9918 =

Video display controller

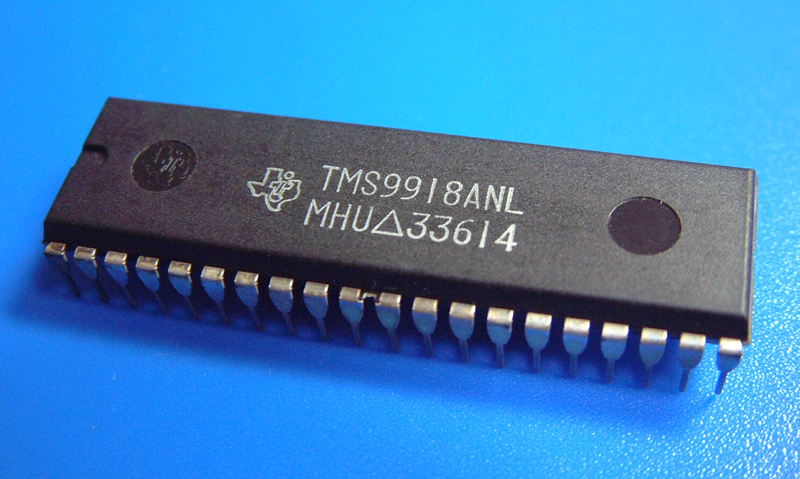
- Component type: video display controller
- First produced: 1979

The TMS9918 is a video display controller (VDC) manufactured by Texas Instruments and introduced in 1979. In TI's manuals it's called a "Video Display Processor", or VDP. The Yamaha V9938 is an enhanced version of the TMS9918.

The TMS9918 is an advanced design for the era. It has four graphics modes based on an underlying 256 wide by 192 high pixel layout, which can be used as a 40 × 24 character display, a 256 × 192 pixel display, or a 64 × 48 pixel display which uses less memory. It has a fixed color palette: 15 colors plus transparent. It also supports 32 single-color 8 × 8 or 16 × 16 pixel sprites, numbered 0 to 31, with lower-numbered sprites appearing on top of higher-numbered ones. This allows for layering and perspective effects. It also has a video input and sync pin, so video from another source can appear under the graphics created by the chip. This can be used to layer the output from multiple 9918's, or to use the 9918 as a system for titling and overlays on other video sources.

To support this advanced feature set, the 9918 requires fast access to memory. It requires a dedicated pool of RAM separate from the main memory of the computer, up to 16 KB depending on what modes are being used. TI referred to this as VRAM. This means that the CPU can only update the video display over a separate 8-bit data bus with the VDP moving data on the bus to and from its dedicated RAM. This limited the speed at which the CPU and 9918 can communicate. It also means that the common solution of using the video chip to refresh memory cannot be used and has to be implemented in separate hardware. While these represent minor complications compared to systems that shared memory in a single pool, the result was a display that was more colorful and closer to arcade video game displays, albeit at the cost of having to include more RAM.

The TMS9918 and its variants are used in the Casio PV-2000, Coleco Adam, ColecoVision, CreatiVision, Hanimex Pencil II, MSX, Memotech MTX, NABU Personal Computer, PECOS, SG-1000, SC-3000, SV-318, SV-328, Sord M5, TI-99/4, Tatung Einstein, Tomy Tutor, Nichibutsu My Vision, Bit Corp. Bit 90, Frael Bruc 100, Dina 2 in 1, Asiel Sistemas PECOS, Zemmix CPC/CPG series, and MFJ-1480B. It was also used in add-ons for the Samsung SPC-1000, BBC Micro, COSMAC Elf, and Apple II.

== Description ==
=== Physical and bus details ===
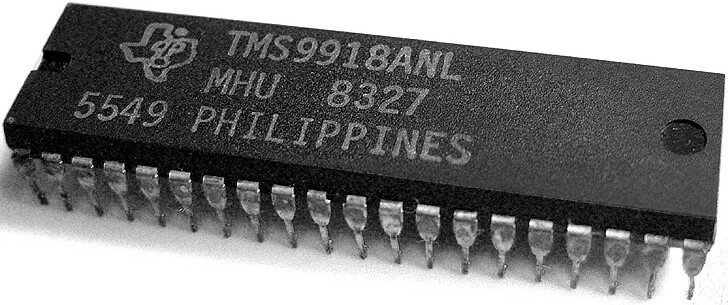
VDP TMS9918A

TMS9918A pinout diagram

The TMS9918 was packaged in a 40-pin dual in-line package (DIP). Power was provided as +5V on pin 33, V_{CC}, and ground on pin 12, V_{SS}. A quartz crystal running at 10.7386 MHz, three times the NTSC color burst frequency, was connected across pins 40, XT1, and 39, XT2. Video output was on pin 36, COMVID, and input, if used, on pin 35, EXTV, with their connector's shield connection connected to ground.

In order to achieve the memory performance needed to support full-color operation, the system used a dedicated area of DRAM they referred to as VRAM. To operate this memory, the system included a separate set of pins forming an 8-bit address bus on pins 3 (AD7) through 10 (AD0) and an 8-bit data bus on pins 25 (RD7) through 32 (RD0), supported by a read/write control on pin 11, and RAS and CAS on pins 1 and 2.

Communications with the host computer were through a separate 8-bit data bus on pins 17 through 24, D7 to D0. Pin 13, MODE, controls whether the data on that bus is an address or data. To write data to the TMS9918, the CPU first sets the bus mode to address and puts the address on the bus, which the TMS9918 stores in an internal address register. The CPU then changes the bus mode to data and puts the data on the bus, which the TMS9918 then reads or writes to the register's address. In order to improve performance, and due to the fact that graphics often write to many consecutive addresses, after every data transfer the TMS9918 internally increments the address, and the CPU can then be read or write the next value without having to send in the address again.

=== Graphics ===
The TMS9918 logically arranges graphics in a number of layers, 32 sprite layers on top, a graphics or text layer, a "backdrop" with a single solid color filling the screen, and finally an external video layer. The backdrop plane is slightly larger than the others, so it completely fills the screen. The other layers are smaller so they remain entirely within the visible area on most screens.

The system uses a 15-color palette, along with color 0 which is transparent. When drawing a particular pixel, the system examines each layer from top to bottom looking for non-0 colors. If one is found, it draws that color and then moves on to the next pixel. If a particular layer is set to transparent, the default value, it checks the next layer and so on until it reaches the external video layer (which is often not used). The following descriptions are ordered in this same fashion.

==== Sprites ====
A key feature of the 9918 series was its sprite support. It used a series of 8 bytes in VRAM to store patterns for 8 by 8 pixel sprites, one byte for each line of 8 pixels. It also had a second mode for 16 by 16 pixel sprites, using 2 bytes per row and 16 rows. Additionally, either size of sprite could be magnified two times to make the spites larger on the screen. The pattern data for the sprites, in 8 or 32 byte long entries, was held in a block of memory known as the sprite generator table (SGT).

In addition to the 8 or 32 byte long entries holding the patterns, there was a separate sprite attribute table (SAT) that defined how the data was interpreted and displayed. This included 8-bit values for the horizontal and vertical position of the sprite, a pointer to the start of the data for that sprite in the SGT (which they called the name), and a color code in the lower four bits, for a total of 4 bytes per sprite for a total of 128 bytes in the SAT.

To determine what color to display at any given pixel on the screen, the system looked to see which sprites were visible at that location based on their X and Y values, and then searched through those patterns until it found the first one that held a 1 in that location, then drew the color found in the SAT for that sprite. This caused the sprites to be displayed in order, such that lower numbered sprites appeared on top of higher numbered ones. That meant, for instance, that sprite 0 always appeared on top of other sprites in that location. If there was no sprite on the screen at that location with a 1, that pixel was transparent, and the background graphics would be displayed instead.

As the sprites were drawn in order, it is sometimes necessary to change that order to produce the desired layering effects. This is the purpose of the "name" field entries in the SAT. For instance, if one wants to change the display so sprite 10 appears in front of 5, the values in the name field entries of the two can be swapped, avoiding the need to move the pattern data. Through careful arrangement of the sprite ordering, the system can easily produce pseudo-3D and parallax scrolling effects.

Due to performance issues, only four sprites can be displayed on any one scan line. If more are specified on a given line, only the first four will appear and the rest are not be displayed. The VDP has a status register that reports the number of the first sprite that had to be skipped. It is up to the programmer to design their system to ensure this limit is not reached. One trick to emulate more sprites on a line can be achieved by changing the priorities by swapping the name values every other frame so that one set of four is displayed on one frame and then another on the next. This allows up to eight sprites on a line, but results in noticeable flickering.

The sprite collision flag is set when non-zero pattern bits of two sprites coincide, even if either sprite has transparent colour. The VDP does not indicate which sprites have collided, simply that at least two have done so. This is normally used to trigger more advanced collision detection routines inside the software, which can then determine the exact location of the collision and act upon it.

==== Graphics modes ====
The graphics of the 9918 were based on an underlying 256 wide by 192 high pixel layout. These numbers are typical for systems of the era which used analog video signals for output in a progressive scan display. This is close to the maximum resolution achieved on television sets of the era, which was around 320 by 240, due to the complexity of the NTSC radio-frequency signals. (Note: And PAL and SECAM as well, which had similar resolution limits.)

There were four ways the graphics layer could be used:

Mode 0, or Text Mode, broke the screen into a 40 by 24 layout of "blocks", each 6 pixels wide and 8 high. Each block could hold a value from 0 to 255, normally representing an expanded 8-bit ASCII character set. The patterns for each of the 256 characters was stored in VRAM and could be changed by loading the VRAM values using the CPU. Each horizontal line of the characters was defined as a series of "on" or "off" pixels stored in one byte per line, 8 bytes per character. Because the blocks were 6 by 8 on the screen, it was up to the designer to lay out the characters in a 5 by 7 grid to leave space between them, leaving the unused row and columns as 0's. The color for the "on" and "off" bits in the patterns could be any of the 15 colors available, and stored in VRAM.

Mode 1, or Graphics I, was essentially a modification of Text Mode that broke the screen into a 32 by 24 layout, so that each block was 8 by 8 pixels instead of 6 by 8. The pattern for any given pixel on the screen was looked up from the same 256-entry table of bit patterns as the one holding characters in Text Mode. As there were 768 possible locations and only 256 possible patterns, this mode was limited in the sorts of displays it could produce. Graphics I also added a separate section of VRAM that held the color values for the on and off pixels for any given block, with 768 entries. This meant every block of 8 by 8 pixels could have its own two colors, but the pixels within any block all had to be the same. This is not an uncommon solution for the era, and leads to a well-known problem known as attribute clash or color spill when it is not possible to choose colors that to not result in the edges of the cells being visible.

Mode 2, or Graphics II, was a further modification of Graphics I, allowing separate patterns for all 768 blocks, as well as separate color settings for each line within the blocks. This meant any block could use all 15 colors, although only two per line. This display allows any image to be drawn and more colors to be displayed, producing a display that is pixel-addressable and suitable for high-resolution drawing of arbitrary images. The cost is that it requires 32 color entries for each of the 192 lines, as well as an extended pattern map with 768 separate entries, increasing the VRAM needed to hold all of the data to about 12 KB.

Mode 3, or Multicolor Mode, broke the screen into 64 by 48 blocks, for a total of 3072 blocks. There were no patterns in this mode, the entire cell was either on or off. There was a color table entry for each block, so every block could select its own color. This produced a low-resolution but high-color display using less than 3 KB of VRAM.

One limitation of the system is that it did not include hardware fine scrolling support, and could only coarse scroll along cell boundaries, normally 8 lines high. Scrolling was accomplished by moving the pattern already stored in VRAM and then adding data for the new line or column, which took some time to perform.

Additionally, as all of the graphics modes were essentially character modes with custom characters in each cell, patterns that spanned cells, like lines or circles, had to calculate the pixels for each line of any given cell and upload those values into the character sets. As these sorts of changes had to be copied byte by byte over the processor data bus, this could be time consuming.

==== Screen Mode 2 details ====
Technically, mode 2 is a character mode with a colorful character set. The screen is horizontally divided into three 256×64 pixel areas, each of which gets its own character set. By sequentially printing the characters 0 through 255 in all three areas, the program can simulate a graphics mode where each pixel can be set individually. However, the resulting framebuffer is non-linear. This means, for instance, drawing a line that crosses the areas can be difficult to program.

The program can also use three identical character sets, and then deal with the screen like a text mode with a colorful character set. Background patterns and sprites then consist of colorful characters. This was commonly used in games, because only 32×24 bytes would have to be moved to fill and scroll the entire screen.

The challenge of using TMS9918 mode 2 was that every 8×1 pixel area could have only two colors, foreground and background. They could be freely picked out of the 16 color palette, but for each 8×1 area, only two colors could exist. When rendering a straight line diagonally, one easily could exceed the maximum 2 colors per 8×1 area and end up with "color spill".

==== Undocumented modes ====
Texas Instruments originally only documented the four modes listed above. However, the bit that enables mode 2 is actually a modifier bit for the other modes, and can be used in combination with any of them. Enabling it does three things:

1. Expands the color table size to hold entries for each cell.
2. Divides the screen horizontally into thirds.
3. Changes two address bits of the pattern and color tables into mask bits, which controls whether each third of the screen has its own pattern and color table (mode 2) or not (mode 1).

By toggling this bit in code, three additional modes are possible. Note that although genuine TMS9918A chips support these modes, clones and emulators may not.

- Mode 0 (Text) + Mode 2 (Graphic 2): Known as Bitmap Text Mode. This mode allows for two-color bitmap images, with no color table. This saves memory, at the expense of a slightly reduced horizontal resolution (text mode has a horizontal resolution of 240 pixels instead of 256 pixels like the graphic modes do).
- Mode 1 (Graphic 1) + Mode 2 (Graphic 2): Known as Half-Bitmap Mode. Texas Instruments actually documented this "undocumented" screen mode in their manual titled "Video Display Processors Programmers Guide SPPU004". In section 8.4.2, "Playing Games with VRAM Addressing", they discuss how this mode combines the memory savings of mode 1 with the color detail of mode 2. However, as they go on to say this mode limits the number of sprites that can be displayed to 8 instead of 32. Therefore, the term "undocumented" used to describe this mode is a misnomer. However, because this manual was not widely known, this mode is generally considered to be one of the undocumented modes. Generally, the only reason to use this mode over Mode 2 is to reduce memory consumption.
- Mode 3 (Multicolor) + Mode 2 (Graphic 2): Known as Bitmap Multicolor Mode. This mode is more of a novelty, as it offers nothing beyond what the standard Multicolor mode can already do.

==== External video ====
Another advanced feature of the 9918 series was its ability to read an external video source and pass that signal through to the output if all of the objects above it are transparent. This allows the system to produce graphics which could then be overlaid on an analog source like a video camera or videotape. To make sure the two displays line up properly, the clock from the external source needs to be fed in as well, replacing the clock signal that would normally be generated by a quartz crystal. Some system to match the output strength of the input signal to the output also needs to be provided so one signal does not overwhelm the other.

==== Colors ====
The TMS9918 family chips used a composite video palette. Colors were generated based on a combination of luminance and chrominance values for the TMS9918A and Y, and R-Y (Pr) and B-Y (Pb)values are for the TMS9928A/9929A.

==== Datasheet values ====
The TMS9918 has a fixed 16-color palette, composed of 15 displayed colors and a "transparent" color, color 0.

- When "transparent" is used for sprites, it will show the graphics plane.
- When "transparent" is used for the text/graphics plane, it will show the backdrop.
- When "transparent" is used for the backdrop, it will show the external video signal (if enabled) otherwise black.

According to "Table 2.3 - Color Assignments" on the datasheet outputs levels are the following:

Color code	Color	TMS9918A		TMS9928A/9929A		
Color code	Color	Luminance	Chrominance	Y	R-Y (Pr)	B-Y (Pb)
0	transparent	0%	-	-	-	-
1	black	0%	-	0%	47%	47%
2	medium green	53%	53%	53%	7%	20%
3	light green	67%	40%	67%	17%	27%
4	dark blue	40%	60%	40%	40%	100%
5	light blue	53%	53%	53%	43%	93%
6	dark red	47%	47%	47%	83%	30%
7	cyan	67%	60%	73%	0%	70%
8	medium red	53%	60%	53%	93%	27%
9	light red	67%	60%	67%	93%	27%
10	dark yellow	73%	47%	73%	57%	7%
11	light yellow	80%	33%	80%	57%	17%
12	dark green	46%	47%	47%	13%	23%
13	magenta	53%	40%	53%	73%	67%
14	gray	80%	-	80%	47%	47%
15	white	100%	-	100%	47%	47%

Note: Colors are merely illustrative, using automated YPbPr to sRGB conversion assuming SMPTE C colorimetry - see the next section for correct color conversions.

==== CRT display ====
Up to that time only cathode ray tubes had been available for computer monitors as well as for televisions, and these CRTs had a gamma. The TMS9918 series chips had been designed to work with such televisions and their CRTs had a gamma of 1.6 (remark: CRTs of Macintosh monitors had 1.8 and the CRTs of PC monitors had 2.2). Digital flat panels do not have gamma. For this reason the colors of the TMS9918 look somewhat pale as in the first table above. The below table uses the gamma-corrected values, which are (written in decimal and hexadecimal):

Color code	Color	R	G	B	R (hex)	G (hex)	B (hex)
1	black	0.00%	0.00%	0.00%	00	00	00
2	medium green	3.82%	67.71%	11,59%	0A	AD	1E
3	light green	20.38%	78.53%	29,88%	34	C8	4C
4	dark blue	16.97%	17.53%	89,04%	2B	2D	E3
5	light blue	31.94%	29.33%	98,40%	51	4B	FB
6	dark red	74.22%	16.04%	14,57%	BD	29	25
7	cyan	11.59%	88.44%	93,68%	1E	E2	EF
8	medium red	98.40%	17.25%	16,97%	FB	2C	2B
9	light red	100.00%	37.25%	29,88%	FF	5F	4C
10	dark yellow	74.22%	63.61%	16,97%	BD	A2	2B
11	light yellow	84.49%	70.69%	32,99%	D7	B4	54
12	dark green	3.82%	54.92%	9,52%	0A	8C	18
13	magenta	68.58%	19.55%	60,44%	AF	32	9A
14	gray	69.98%	69.98%	69,98%	B2	B2	B2
15	white	100.00%	100.00%	100.00%	FF	FF	FF

Derivation:

Converting Y, R-Y and B-Y to RGB requires considering how Y originated:

 Y = R * 0.30 + G * 0.59 + B * 0.11

This leads to the following formulas:

 R = R-Y + Y
 B = B-Y + Y
 G = (Y - 0.30 * R - 0.11 * B) / 0.59

But for all colors that have no chrominance - thus black, gray and white - R-Y and B-Y are not 0% but all have an offset of 47%. So this offset has to be subtracted from all R-Y and B-Y values at first.

Then comes the conversion to RGB, which results should be in the range from 0% to 100%. But for color "light red" the value of R results in 113%. This might seem to come from a typo within the datasheet and there R-Y should not be greater than 80%. But measuring the output signals of the chip with an oscilloscope shows that all values in the table are correct. So the error is inside the chip and drives the red signal into saturation. For this reason this value is to be corrected to 100%.

Finally the gamma correction needs to be done by raising the values to the power of 1.6.

Hexadecimal values can then be obtained by transforming the range of the values from 0...100 to 0...255, thus multiplying them with 2.55 and then rounding them.

== Product family ==
All of the ICs in this family are usually referred to by the TMS9918 name, sometimes with an "A" postfix. The "A" indicates a second version of the chip which added new features, most prominently the addition of a bitmap mode (Graphic II).

Texas Instruments TMS9918 Product Family Summary
Chip Variant	Video Out	Video In	Video Frequency	Mode 2 Support
9918	Composite	Composite	60 Hz	No
9918A / 9118	Composite	Composite	60 Hz	Yes
9928A / 9128	YPbPr	(None)	60 Hz	Yes
9929A / 9129	YPbPr	(None)	50 Hz	Yes

The key features of this chip are, as highlighted in a 1980 presentation by Karl Guttag (one of the designers):

- 256 by 192 full color pixels per screen
- 15 different colors and/or shades
- Non-interlaced color composite video output
- Direct wiring to RAS/CAS type dynamic RAMs
- Automatic refresh of dynamic RAMs
- General 8-bit memory mapped type CPU interface
- CPU accesses RAM via VDP (no need for DMA)
- 32 dynamic characters per screen
- Thirty-two 8×8 patterns per row, 24 rows per screen
- Text mode with forty 6×8 patterns per row
- Multicolor mode with 64 by 48 memory mappable color squares
- External video input and control
- Single supply +5 volt operation
- Standard N-Channel silicon gate technology

=== TMS9918 ===
The TMS9918 was only used in the TI-99/4; the TI-99/4A and the other computers had the A version VDC.

=== TMS9918A, TMS9928A and TMS9929A ===
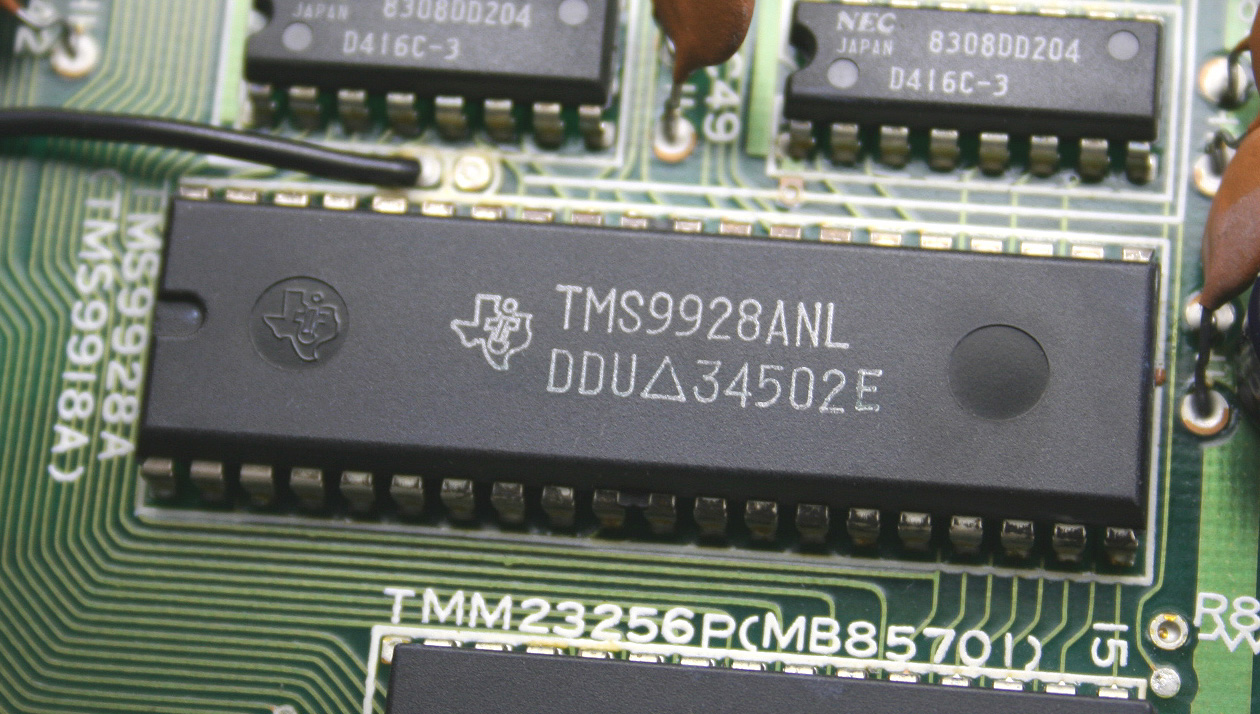
VDP TMS9928A

The TMS9918A and TMS9928A output a 60 Hz video signal, while the TMS9929A outputs 50 Hz. The difference between "1" and the "2" in "TMS9918A" and "TMS9928A" is that the "1" version outputs composite NTSC video, while the "2" versions (including the TMS9929A) outputs analog Y luminance and R-Y and B-Y colour difference signals. The need for the latter was predominant in the 50 Hz world, including Europe, due to the different video signal standards PAL and SECAM. It was more cost-effective to output Y, R-Y and B-Y and encode them into PAL or SECAM in the RF modulator, than to try to have a different console for every different color standard. The "1" version also features an external composite video input which made it a handy chip to use in video "titlers" that could overlay text or graphics on video, while the "2" version does not.

The original variants of the TMS9918 were depletion-load NMOS and manufactured on a 4.5 μm process; it was one of the first depletion load NMOS chips Texas Instruments manufactured in contrast to the TMS9900 microprocessor which used the older enhancement load NMOS process that required three supply voltages. Due to the large die size and relatively high internal speed, the TMS9918 ran warm enough to necessitate a heat sink; some devices such as the Taiwanese DINA console (a hybrid Colecovision/SG-1000) neglected to install sinks and suffered from malfunctions of the chip. By 1983 Texas Instruments had shrunk the die size to 3 μm which ran cooler and no longer required a sink; MSX machines and the Sega SG-1000 used the newer 3 μm TMS9918 while most Colecovisions had the original 4.5 μm variant (the final run of the consoles produced in 1985 had the newer model TMS9918).

=== TMS9118, TMS9128 and TMS9129 ===
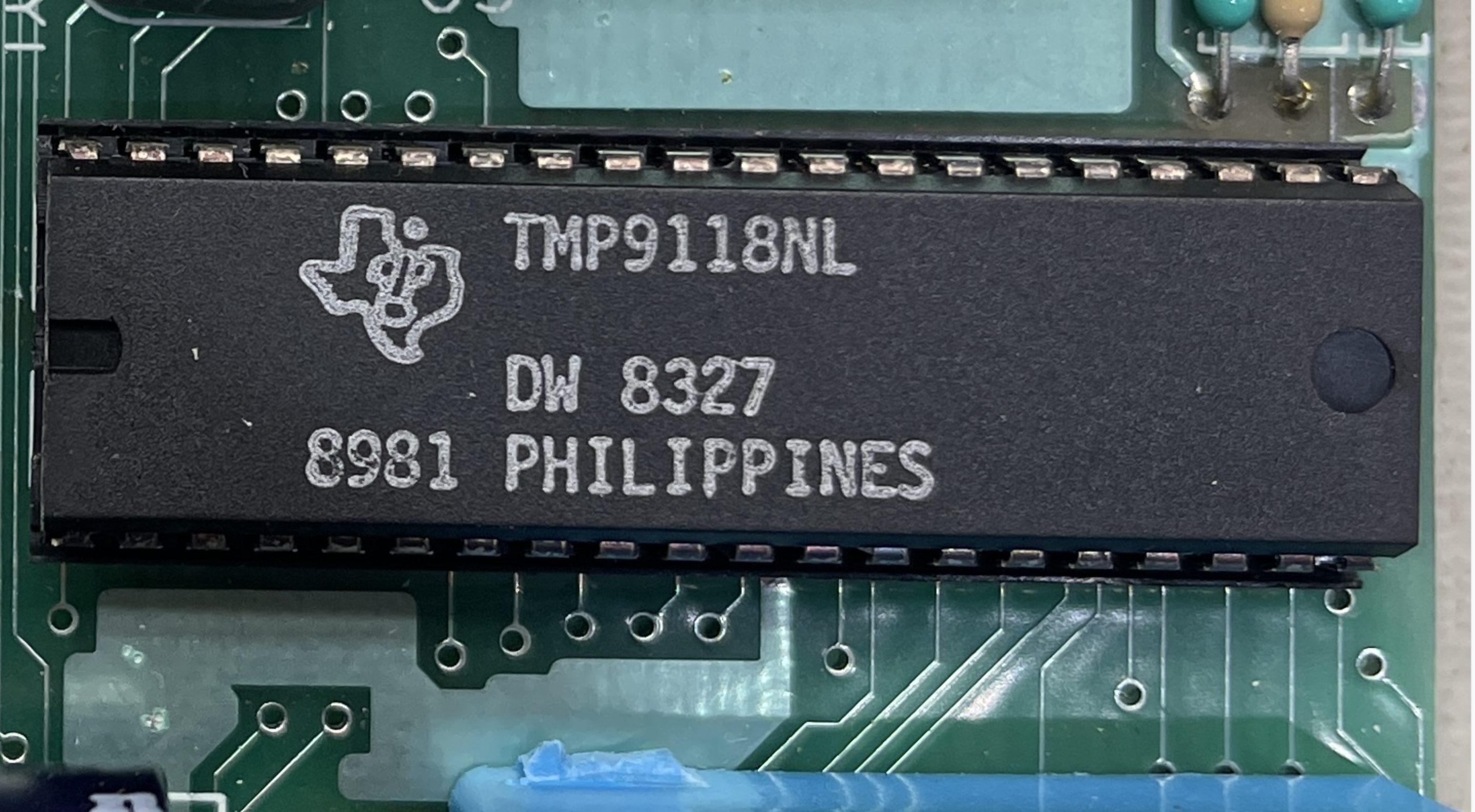
VDP TMP9118NL prototype

A later variant of the TMS9918 series chips, the TMS9118, TMS9128, and TMS9129, were released in the mid-late 1980s, but were never very popular. The function of one pin is changed, and the mapping of the video memory allows two 16K×4-bit chips to be used instead of the eight 16K×1-bit chips the TMS99xx needs. Otherwise the chips are completely identical to the TMS9918A, TMS9928A and TMS9929A respectively.

== Specifications ==
- Video RAM: direct wiring to 4, 8, or 16 KB
- Text modes: 40 × 24 and 32 × 24
- Resolution: 256 × 192
- Colours: 15 colours + transparent
- Sprites: 32, 1 colour, max 4 per horizontal line

== Usage ==
The TMS9918 and its variants are used in:

- Bit 90
- Casio PV-2000
- Coleco Adam
- ColecoVision
- CreatiVision
- Dina 2 in 1
- Frael Bruc 100
- Hanimex Pencil II
- Memotech MTX
- MFJ-1480B
- MSX
- NABU Personal Computer
- Nichibutsu My Vision
- Asiel Sistemas PECOS
- SC-3000
- SG-1000
- Sord M5
- SV-318
- SV-328
- Tatung Einstein
- TI-99/4 and TI-99/4A
- Tomy Tutor
- Zemmix CPC/CPG series

It was also used in add-ons for:

- Apple II
- BBC Micro
- COSMAC Elf
- Samsung SPC-1000

== Legacy ==
Texas Instruments' TMS9918A was succeeded by the Yamaha V9938, which added additional bitmap modes, more colorful sprites, a vertical full-screen scroll register, vertical and horizontal offset registers, a hardware blitter and a customizable palette. The V9938 was designed for the MSX2 standard of computers, and later used in a third-party upgrade to the TI-99/4A: the Geneve 9640 "computer-on-a-card".

The V9938, in turn, was succeeded by the V9958 which added some additional high-colour modes and a horizontal two-page scroll register. These chips were used in the MSX2+/turboR systems.

Toshiba made a clone called the T6950 which does not support the undocumented pattern / color table masking feature in graphics 2 mode. Later, Toshiba released the T7937A MSX-Engine with a built-in VDP with working masking features. Both VDPs by Toshiba feature a palette which is slightly different (more vivid colors) from the TI VDPs.

The VDP of the Master System game console is an evolution of the TMS9918. This was further evolved into the VDP of the Genesis/Mega Drive game console, which replaces most of the graphics modes from the Master System VDP with more capable versions.

== See also ==
- TMS34010, a 1986 microprocessor with dedicated graphics instructions
- Atari 8-bit computers have comparable graphics hardware introduced the same year
- Motorola 6845, a display controller widely used in 8-bit computers
- Motorola 6847
- Yamaha V9938
- Yamaha V9958
- List of 8-bit computer hardware graphics
