= VTech CreatiVision =

Hybrid computer and home video game console

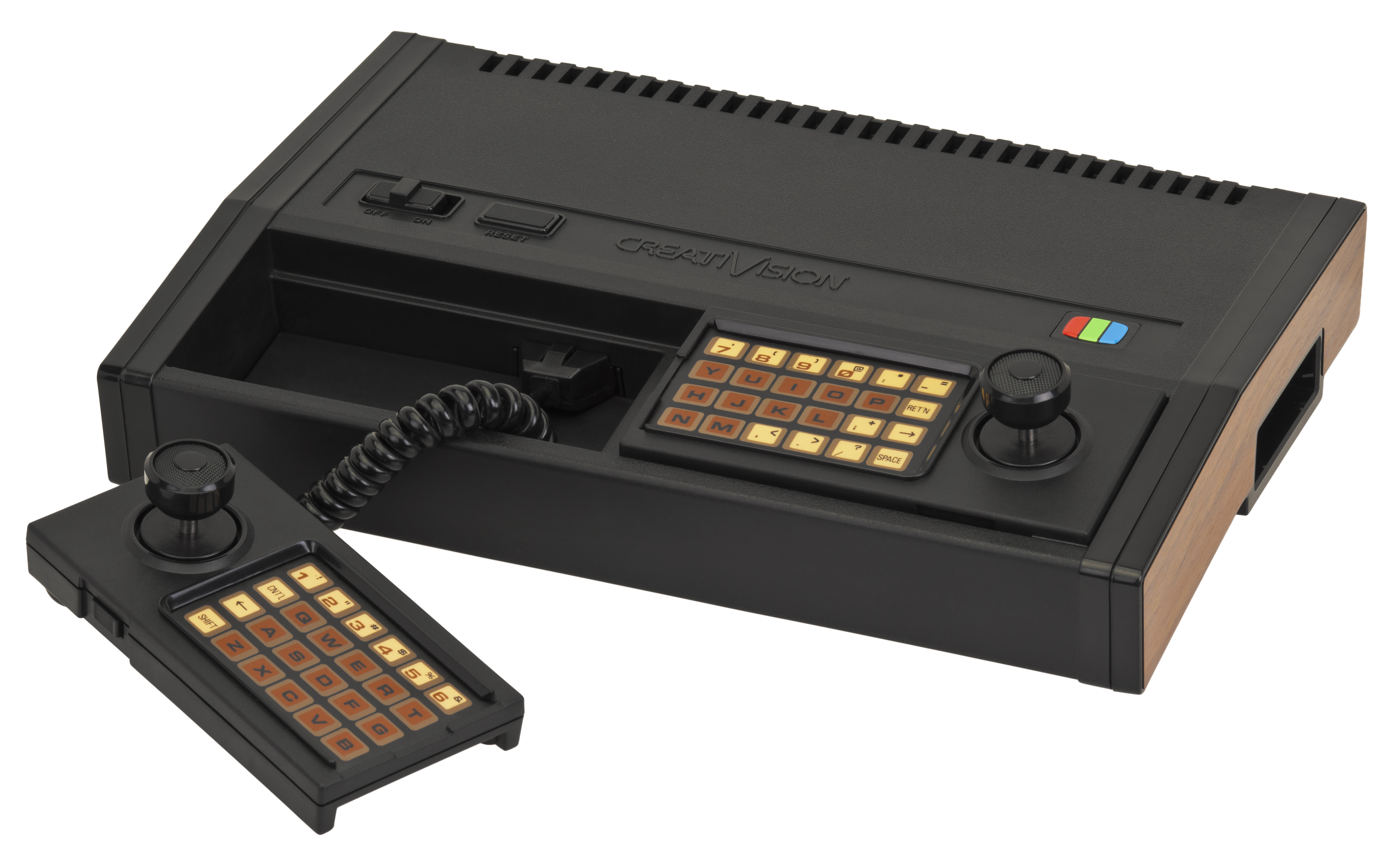
- VTech CreatiVision
- Manufacturer: VTech
- Type: Home video game console/home computer
- Generation: Second generation
- Released: 1982; 44 years ago (Hong Kong)
- Discontinued: Early 1986
- CPU: Rockwell 6502 @ 2 MHz
- Memory: 1 Kb RAM, 16 Kb VRAM
- Storage: Cassette tapes
- Removable storage: ROM cartridges
- Graphics: Texas Instruments TMS 9918/9929
- Sound: TI SN76489
- Controller input: Joystick/membrane keypad controllers
- Successor: VTech Socrates

The VTech CreatiVision is a hybrid computer and home video game console introduced by VTech in 1981 and released in 1982 during the second generation of video game consoles. The hybrid unit was similar in concept to computers such as the APF Imagination Machine, the older VideoBrain Family Computer, and to a lesser extent the Intellivision game console and Coleco Adam computer, all of which anticipated the trend of video game consoles becoming more like low-end computers. It was discontinued in 1986.

== History ==
The CreatiVision was distributed in many European countries, including most German-speaking countries like West Germany, Austria and Switzerland and also Italy, South Africa, and Israel under the Educat 2002 name, as well as in Australia and New Zealand under The Dick Smith Wizzard name. Other names for the system (all officially produced by VTech themselves) include the FunVision Computer Video Games System, Hanimex Rameses (both released in Australia and New Zealand) and VZ 2000 (planned for release in France, likely unreleased). All CreatiVision and similar clones were designed for use with PAL standard television sets, except the Japanese CreatiVision (distributed by Cheryco) which was NTSC, a USA release was planned.. It is now very sought by collectors.

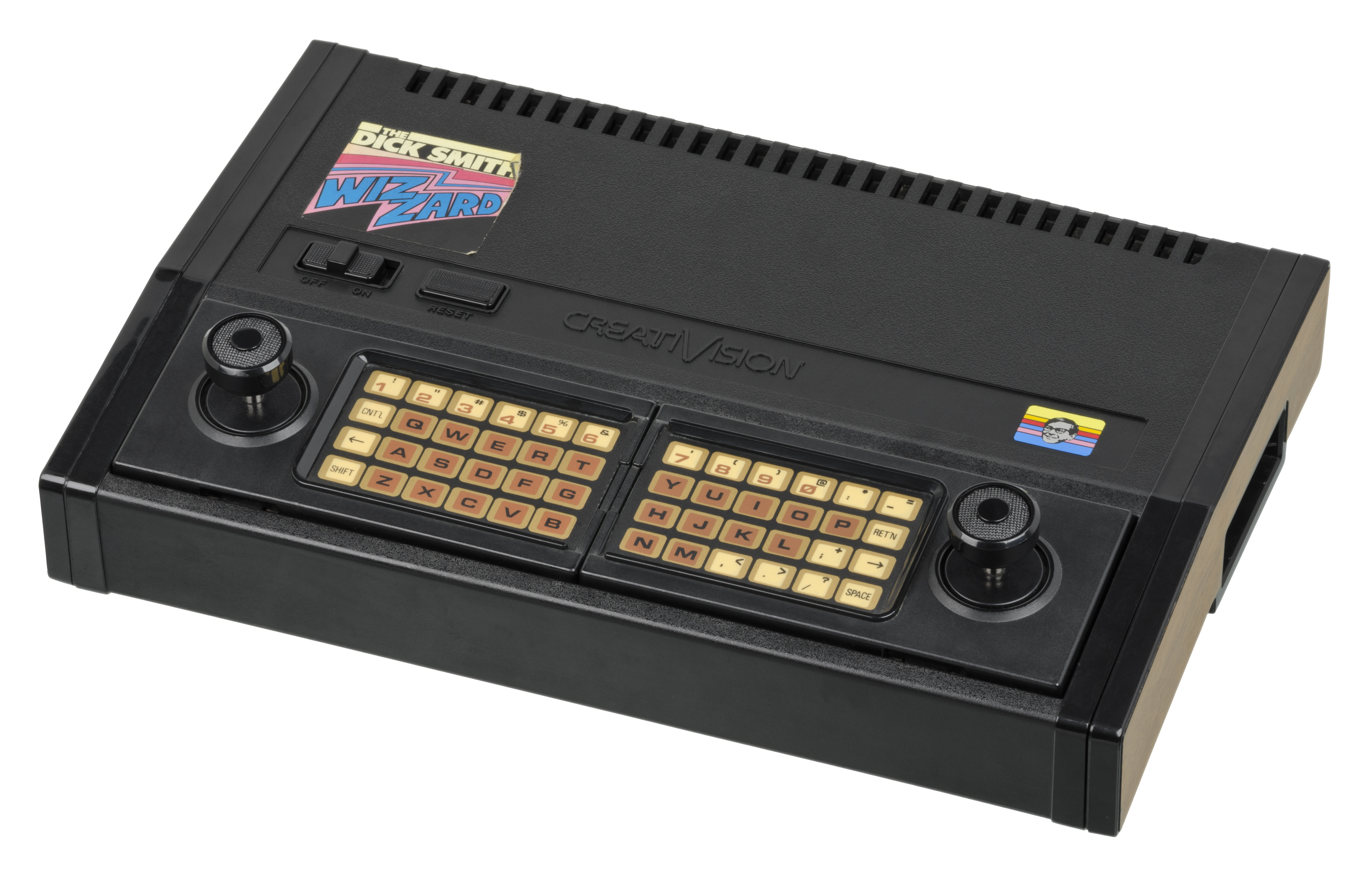
VTech CreatiVision, rebranded as the Dick Smith Wizzard

The CreatiVision console sports an 8-bit Rockwell 6502 CPU at a speed of 2 MHz, 1KB of RAM and 16KB of Video RAM, and has a graphics resolution of 256 × 192 with 15 colors and 32 sprites. The console has two integrated joystick/membrane keypad controllers (much like the ColecoVision and Atari 5200) which, when set in a special compartment on top of the console, can be used as a computer keyboard. The CreatiVision has interfaces for a cassette player, an extra rubber keyboard, parallel I/O interface, floppy disk drive and modem (likely unreleased) and one memory expansion module for use with the Basic language cartridge. Any Centronics-compatible printer can be connected to the I/O module if present.

The CreatiVision was discontinued in late 1985/early 1986.

=== Laser 2001 computer ===
A computer was produced by VTech in 1984-1986, based on CreatiVision hardware and compatible with most of its games: Laser 2001, which is also sold in West Germany and was brought to France. It was also available in Finland through Salora, with the name of Manager. The Manager had a Finnish keyboard layout and character set.

=== ColecoVision module ===
A module to allow ColecoVision games to be played was designed for use with the CreatiVision Mark-2 model (a later revision of the 1st model, incorporating hardware changes specifically designed to make the Coleco-module work). Before being produced, the module was modified internally and released for use on the Laser 2001 and Manager computers only. A special adaptor (homebrew) would be needed to make the Coleco-module work on the CreatiVision Mark-2.

== List of games ==
In some regions, the console and its games were distributed by different companies, such as Cheryco in Japan, and Hanimex in Australia. VTech reissued several previous existing games in 1985.

There were eighteen titles known to have been released.

Background shading indicates games that were reissued in 1985.

#	Title	AKA title(s)	Genre(s)	Clone of	Release year
1	Air/Sea Attack	(Japan) Submarine (Australia) Air/Sea Battle	Fixed shooter		1981
2	Astro Pinball		Pinball	None	1982
3	Auto Chase	(Australia) Car Chase	Maze, Driving	Rally-X	1981
4	BASIC Interpreter 1.0		Programming	None	1982
5	Chopper Rescue		Scrolling shooter		1983
6	Crazy Chicky	(Japan) Crazy Paku	Maze	Pac-Man (with modified gameplay)	1982
7	Crazy Pucker	Reissued as Crazy Chewy and Crazy Moonie	Maze	Pac-Man	1981
8	Deep Sea Adventure		Scrolling shooter	Defender	1982
9	Locomotive		Platformer	BurgerTime	1983
10	Mouse Puzzle		Puzzle	Guttang Gottong	1982
11	Music Maker		Music	None	1983
12	Planet Defender	(Japan) Earth Defense Force (Chikyū Bōeigun) (Australia) Galaxy Defender	Scrolling shooter	Defender	1981
13	Police Jump		Platformer	Donkey Kong	1982
14	Soccer		Sports	None	1983
15	Sonic Invader	(Australia) Invaders	Fixed shooter	Space Invaders	1981
16	Stone Age		Puzzle	Pengo	1984
17	Tank Attack	(Australia) Tank Battle	Multi-directional shooter	Combat (video game)	1981
18	Tennis	(Australia) Who's for Tennis?	Sports	None	1981

Dick Smith Electronics also released software for the device, including forty one games.

Title	Format	Model
Asteroids		Model X-7248
Attack of the Killer Tomatoes		Model X-7274
Backammon		Model X-7273
Battleships		Model X-1723
Bowling Model		Model X-1724
Chess		Model X-7275
Code Breaker		Model X-1700
Combination		Model X-1720
Concentration		Model X-1725
Dawn Patrol		Model X-7333
Digout		Model X-7336
Dracula Castle		Model X-7272
Draughts		Model X-1722
Duel		Model X-7279
Factory Flare-up	tape	Model X-1728
Formula 1		Model X-7331
Galaxon		Model X-7332
Game Disk 1		Model X-7400
Game Disk 2		Model X-7401
Game Disk 3		Model X-7402
Game Disk 4		Model X-7403
Grandfathers Gold	tape	Model X-1726
Hamburger Sam		Model X-7337
Hangman		Model X-7233
Hoppy		Model X-7243
Kamakazi		Model X-7334
Knights & Dragons		Model X-7245
Ladder Challenge		Model X-7268
Lunar Lander		Model X-7338
Lunar Landing		Model X-1721
Metric Spycacther		Model X-7289
Missile Attack		Model X-7335
Othello		Model X-7271
Poker		Model X-7232
Slot Machine		Model X-7234
Starblaster		Model X-7247
Super Snake		Model X-7244
VZ Ghost Hunter		Model X-7242
VZ Panic		Model X-7270
VZ-Invaders		Model X-7239
Whizkid Spycatch		Model X-7290
