= At the Gates of Moscow 1941 =

1985 video game

At the Gates of Moscow
- Developer: Strategic Games Publications
- Publisher: Strategic Games Publications
- Platform: Apple II
- Release: 1985
- Genre: Strategy
- Modes: Single-player, multiplayer

At the Gates of Moscow 1941 (ATGOM) is a video game that was published in 1985 by Strategic Games Publications for the Apple II. Based on the board game of the same name that was released the year prior, the game was marketed in magazines as "The only board and computer game that can be played together and separately".

== Gameplay ==
At the Gates of Moscow 1941 is a turn-based, divisional-level, hex-based wargame set during Operation Typhoon, the German operation to capture Moscow. Set between 1 September 1941 to 6 March 1942, the game has three scenarios where the player can control either the Soviets or the Germans. The first two scenarios are set between 11 November and 30 December 1941. The first scenario is called "To The Gates Of Moscow", focusing on the final German assault on Moscow, while the second is the same but also features the Russian winter counter-offensive. The final of the three is the full campaign.

The player would compete with their opponent in order to gain reinforcements, reserves, supplies and victory points, with the ultimate goal in both scenarios being to either defend or capture Moscow. The game can either be played in "solitaire" (singleplayer) mode (with the computer playing as the Soviets), two player or a multiplayer game. The computer has ten difficulty levels, with each difficulty level growing in complexity. The higher the level, the further the computer will think ahead.

The forces available to the player are meant to represent the forces that were available at the time, with ten different kinds of units being available to the player. Each "turn" in the game represents one week of real time, with each unit representing a single division. Players can stack up to four units within a single hex, with the map being split between the close-up mode and the strategic mode, containing over 2,960 hexes. Computer Gaming World would describe this as "the largest computer wargame to date". Players are also allowed to place their units as they see fit before the game starts, with there being no pre set up. The player can control the cursor controlled by buttons 1-6 and select the close-up mode with the S key, allowing for easier manoeuvring of units without having to scroll too far. The strategic map shows a broader overview of the situation.

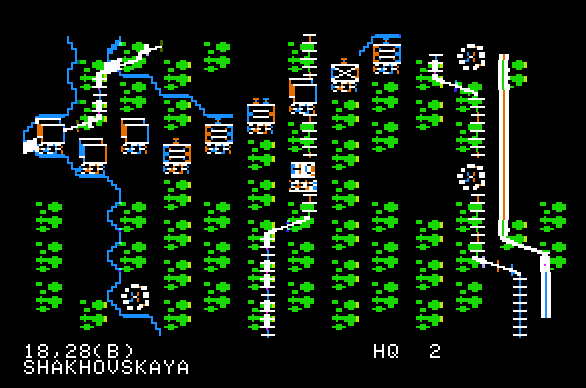
Strategic map on the top, close-in map on the bottom

The game simulates variable weather and ground conditions in order to simulate the "rasputitsa", literally translated as "the season of bad roads", where secondary roads on the game map will disappear and be replaced by "a sea of mud". This means that the German side must allocate 6 divisions to "mud duties" in order to clear the roads. As the weather worsens, movement also becomes more costly and combat becomes less effective, however this affects the Germans to a greater degree due to the Soviet's obvious advantages of preparedness for the winter. As the game progresses into winter, the Soviet side gains the initiative. In terms of terrain, there are ten different kinds of terrain.

Initiative determines who moves first each turn, with each half-turn ending once all of the current player's supply points have been expended either through moving units or combat. Thus, the key to succeed in the game is through the proper management of supplies.

The Soviets also have the ability to build entrenchments, fortify towns and cities, build militia units, while also being able to use ski units and paratroopers. The Germans must build garrison units in towns, cities and on railroads to protect them from Russian partisans.

In the first two turns of the game, Soviet forces have a chance of surrendering. If they do so in sufficient numbers, the Germans must assign two divisions to move for one turn to escort the prisoners of war to the rear. Additionally, each turn the respective leaders of each nation will issue "directives", stating various goals such as to "take Kursk this turn", not to retreat or to hold a certain position. If either side fails to do so, they may lose the command of a valuable leader. The aforementioned leaders are vital not only for the command, control and activation of units, but they are also valuable in terms of their abilities. They are measured by eight different metrics;

- Offensive ability
- Defensive ability
- Aggressiveness
- Organizational skills
- Political finesse
- Initiative
- Independence
- The ability to gain reserves from their superiors

This means that while one leader may be better suited to coordinating attacks, another may be better suited to defending a position.

In the fog of war mode, all hostile units in an adjacent hex to friendly units can be seen by the player, with enemies behind friendly lines having around a 35% chance of being spotted. This chance will decrease with inclement weather, simulating the diminished ability or outright cessation of reconnaissance flights.

While other wargames simulate air power in some form or another, ATGOM simulates both offensive and defensive air support, while also simulating interdiction of this air support. For the German side, "terror bombing" is also a feature, affecting Russian supply and attempts to form militia units.

Due to the board game and the computer game sharing a ruleset, both could be played either separately or together.

== Reception ==
Lew Fisher reviewed the game for Computer Gaming World, stating,

ATGOM is an excellent effort for the designer's first computer game. I hope to see more scenarios using the same map. Also, they have several other games in the works. If they are anything like this game they should prove interesting as well as innovative.

He would also criticise the game, stating,

However, several things should be considered before buying it. One, this is a detailed simulation with each turn taking a long time to play. I recommend this game to the serious gamer with time on his hands. Second, although the documentation was well done and easy to digest, there were many holes and inconsistencies. The game can be played, but it takes several games to find out exactly what to do or why certain things are happening.
