= Tatung Einstein =

8-bit personal computer

Tatung Einstein TC-01
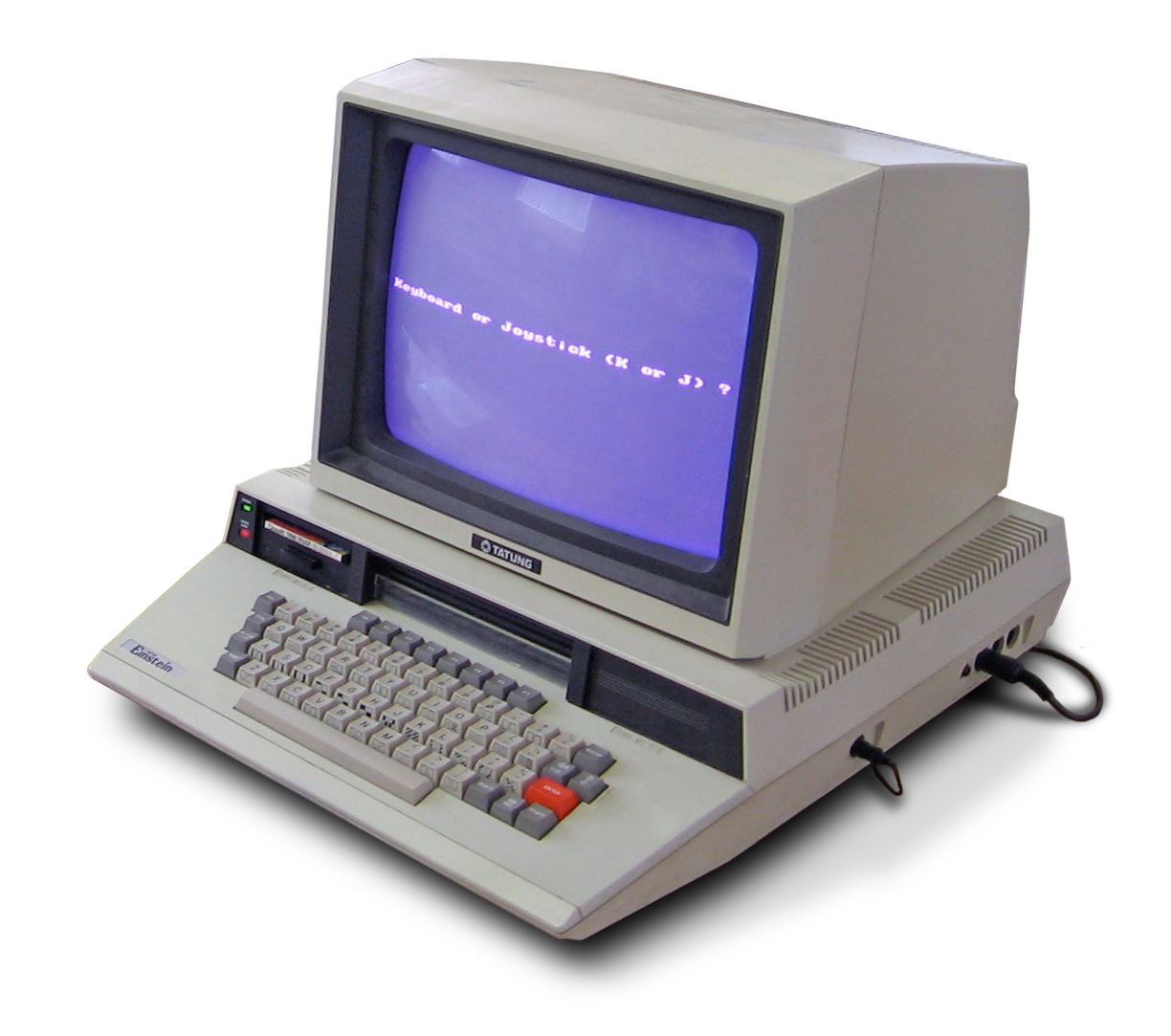
- Manufacturer: Tatung
- Type: Personal computer
- Released: 1984; 42 years ago
- Introductory price: £499 (equivalent to £1,630 in 2025)
- Media: 3-inch floppy disk
- Operating system: MOS (Machine Operating System); Xtal DOS (CP/M-compatible); Xtal BASIC (BASIC)
- CPU: Zilog Z80A @ 4 MHz
- Memory: 64 KB RAM, 16 KB VRAM, 8 KB - 32 KB ROM
- Storage: 3-inch floppy drive (1770 FDC)
- Display: 256 × 192, 16 colours
- Graphics: TMS9129
- Sound: AY-3-8910
- Input: 51-key keyboard, joystick
- Connectivity: RS-232
- Dimensions: 43.5 × 51.5 × 11.5 cm (17.1 × 20.3 × 4.5 in)
- Successor: Tatung Einstein 256

The Tatung Einstein is an eight-bit home/personal computer produced by Taiwanese corporation Tatung, designed in Bradford, England at Tatung's research laboratories and assembled in Bridgnorth and Telford, England. It was aimed primarily at small businesses.

== History ==
The Tatung Einstein TC-01 was released in the United Kingdom in the summer of 1984, and 5,000 were exported to Taipei later that year. A Tatung monitor (monochrome or colour) and dot matrix printer were also available as options, plus external disc drives and an 80 column display card. It was also capable of running ZX Spectrum software with the "Speculator" addon.

More expensive than most of its rivals, the Einstein was popular with contemporary programmers as a development machine but was commercially unsuccessful.

A later revised version, called the Tatung Einstein 256 and released in 1985, suffered a similar fate.

== Design ==
The machine was physically large, with an option for one or two built-in three-inch floppy disk drives manufactured by Hitachi. At the time, most home computers in the UK used ordinary tape recorders for storage. Another unusual feature of the Einstein was that on start-up the computer entered a simple machine code monitor, called MOS (Machine Operating System).

A variety of software could then be loaded from disk, including a CP/M-compatible operating system called Xtal DOS (pronounced 'Crystal DOS', created by Crystal Computers in Torquay), and a BASIC interpreter (Xtal BASIC). More than 400 software titles were released for the system, including about 120 games. Versions of popular software like DBase or WordStar were available.

Thanks to the reliability of the machine, and ample memory, the machine proved useful by many software houses to use for programming, and then porting the code to the machines they were made for, namely the Spectrum 48k, Amstrad CPC, and Commodore 64. Eventually, it was superseded by the PC and Atari ST as the development systems of choice.

The follow on machine, the Einstein 256, basically was the same as the original, with improved video (Yamaha V9938) and a more slimline black case.

== Technical specifications ==
The machines were quite similar.

The Tatung Einstein TC-01 specifications are similar to the MSX standard.

- CPU: Zilog Z80A @ 4 MHz
- ROM: 8K to 32K
- RAM: 64 KB system; 16 KB video
- Video: Texas Instruments TMS9129, 16 colours, 32 sprite planes
- Audio: AY-3-8910 (also reads the keyboard matrix)
- Z84C30 CTC
- Z84C20 PIO
- Intel 8251 SIO
- 1770 FDC 3'' floppy disk controllers
- Z80 'Tube' bus/interface
- Analogue joystick ports

The Tatung Einstein 256 was similar to the original with improved video (Yamaha V9938) and more RAM.

- RAM: 64K user; 192K video
- Video: Yamaha V9938, 512 colours

== Games ==
There are 161 (Note: This number is always up to date by this script) known commercial games released for the Tatung Einstein.

| Title | Publisher | Year |
|---|---|---|
| 256 Games Pack for Einstein 256 | Merlin | 1986 |
| 3D Noughts and Crosses | Solo Software | |
| 6 in One | Solo Software | |
| Agrovator | Syntax Software | |
| Alice and the March Hare | Orion Software | 1986 |
| Alien 8 | A.C.G. | |
| Attack of the Killer Tomatoes | Merlin | |
| Ballyhoo | Infocom | |
| Bat Attack | Kuma Software | |
| Batman | Ocean | |
| Beach Head 1 + 2 | Tatung Einsoft | |
| Bell Super Six Games | Bell Software | |
| Bell Super Ten Games | Bell Software | |
| Boardello | Bubble Bus Software | 1985 |
| Bumper Games Pack | Tatung Einsoft | |
| Buzz Off/Shark Hunter | Electric Software | |
| C.T.C Games Pack | Fydler | |
| Card Sharp | Emsoft | |
| Casino | Emsoft | |
| Castle Quest + Quest | Kuma Software | |
| Channel Tunnel | Solo Software | |
| Chuckie Egg | Tatung Einsoft | |
| Cluedo | Leisure Genius | 1984 |
| Colour Fantasia | Kuma Software | 1984 |
| Commando Plain/Nightmare Park | Solo Software | |
| Cursed Chambers + ZRIM | Kuma Software | |
| Cursed Chambers/Zrim | Kuma Software | |
| Cyfax | Solo Software | |
| Dan Diamond Trilogy | Tatung Einsoft | |
| Deadline | Infocom | |
| Deadzone | Merlin | |
| Disco Dan | Tatung Einsoft | 1984 |
| Doom Manor | Fydler | |
| Dr Frankie | Syntax Software | |
| Dragon's Lair | Merlin/Software Projects | |
| Druid | Merlin | |
| Einjong | Merlin | |
| Eliminator/Reversi | Merlin | |
| Elite | Firebird Software | |
| Escape from Merlin 8 | Merlin | |
| Family Pack 1 | Solo Software | |
| Fathom's Deep | Merlin | |
| Flight Path 737 | Anirog | |
| Flight Simulation | ScreenSoft | 1985 |
| Football Manager/Pinball | Sharward Services | |
| Fruckles/Toado | Merlin | |
| Fu-Kung in Las Vegas | Tatung Einsoft | 1985 |
| Fydler Six Game Pack | P.C.S | |
| Games Compendium | Solo Software | |
| Games Night | Emsoft | |
| Get Lost + Mr Fixit | Solo Software | 1984 |
| Gloop | Merlin | |
| Gronks | Tatung Einsoft | |
| Heli-Maths | ScreenSoft | 1985 |
| Highway Encounter | Orion Software | 1985 |
| Hitchhikers Guide to the Galaxy | Infocom | |
| House of Usher | Merlin | |
| Hunchback | Ocean | |
| Hustler | Bubble Bus Software | 1985 |
| Hyperball | Merlin | |
| Hyperball II | Merlin | |
| Icem | Orion Software | |
| Impossible Mission | Tatung Einsoft | |
| Infidel | Infocom | |
| Interstella Explorer/Miner Dick | Merlin | |
| Island of Artuan | Kuma Software | |
| Jet Set Willy | Software Projects, Ltd. | |
| Jet Set Willy 2/Manic Miner | Software Projects | |
| Jet Set Willy/Harvey Smith Showjumping | Software Projects/Team Sanyo | |
| Jetpack | Merlin | |
| Jump Mania | Merlin | |
| Kid's Stuff | Merlin | |
| Knight Lore | Tatung/Ultimate | |
| Konami Four Disk Arcade | Konami | |
| Konami Four Game Arcade | Konami | |
| Lazy Jones | Terminal Software | 1985 |
| Le Mans | Electric Software | |
| Leather Godesses of Phobos | Infocom | |
| Les Flics | Electric Software | 1985 |
| Manic Miner | Software Projects, Ltd. | 1985 |
| Manik Panik + Galaxoids | Solo Software | |
| Manik Panik/Galaxoids | Solo Software | |
| Mathe-Magic + Scoop | Solo Software | |
| Maths Quest + Alphabet Quest | Solo Software | |
| Maxima | Solo Software | 1985 |
| Mayhem | Solo Software | |
| Mazeman | Sharwood Services | |
| Maziacs | Einsoft | 1985 |
| Merlin Games Compendium | Merlin | |
| Miner Dick | Merlin | 1984 |
| Minnesota Fats' Pool Challenge | Bubble Bus Software | 1985 |
| Monopoly | Leisure Genius | |
| Music Composer | Kuma Software | |
| Nightmare Park + Commando Plain | Solo Software | |
| Norseman/Backgammon | Electric Software | |
| Oh Mummy! | Tatung Einsoft | 1984 |
| One man and his droid | Tatung Einsoft | |
| Pakman + Millipede | Kuma Software | |
| Pakman/Millipede | Kuma Software | |
| Panzer Attack | MC Lothlorien | 1985 |
| Planetfall | Infocom | |
| Polaris | Solo Software | |
| Punchy | Tatung Einsoft | 1985 |
| Qoko 2 | Orion Software | |
| Quantum | Merlin | |
| Quest/Castle Quest | Kuma Software | |
| Rebound | Everco | |
| Reversi | Merlin | |
| River Bandit | Merlin | |
| Rocket + Giant Maths + Mighty Writer | Solo Software | |
| Roverball | Merlin | |
| Sasa | Mass Tael Ltd | |
| Scrabble | Leisure Genius | 1985 |
| Seastalker | Infocom | |
| Soho | Emsoft | |
| Sorcerer | Infocom | |
| Soul of a Robot/F1 Simulator | Merlin | |
| Southern Belle | Merlin | |
| Space Trap | Solo Software | 1985 |
| Space Traveller/Reversi | Merlin | |
| Special Operations | MC Lothlorien | |
| Speculator Disks 1,2 and 3 | Syntax Software | |
| Spell n' Build | Solo Software | |
| Spellbreaker | Infocom | 1985 |
| Sprog | Merlin | |
| Starbase | Merlin | |
| Starcross | Infocom | |
| Starquake | Merlin | |
| Stepper | KH Scriven | 1986 |
| Stock Tycoon | Screensoft | |
| Super 6 Games | Bell Software | |
| Super Cobra | Konami/Sharwood Services | |
| Super Six Game Pack | Tatung Einsoft | |
| Superchess | Kuma Software | 1984 |
| Superstore | Kuma Software | |
| Suspended | Infocom | |
| Telebunnie | Mass Tael Ltd | |
| The Computer Edition of Scrabble Brand Crossword Game | Leisure Genius | 1985 |
| The Hitchhiker's Guide to the Galaxy | Infocom | 1984 |
| The Kingdom in Chess | Fydler | |
| The Ultra | Solo Software | 1985 |
| The Wreck | Electric Software | |
| Theatre Europe | Merlin | |
| Time Bandits | Orion Software | |
| Time Trap | Tatung Einsoft | 1984 |
| Toado + Fruckles | Syntax Software | 1986 |
| Tombs of Karnak + Encounter | Solo Software | |
| Tombs of Karnak/Encounter | Solo Software | |
| Tournament Snooker | Hard Software | |
| Tracker | Solo Software | |
| Traditional 16+ Maths + Cyfax | Solo Software | |
| Turbo Chess/Draughts | Screensoft | |
| Tycoon/Pelmanism | Kuma Software | |
| Wishbringer | Infocom | |
| Witness | Infocom | |
| Xanagrams + Quadrax | Kuma Software | |
| Xanagrams/Quadrax | Kuma Software | |
| Zexl | Everco | |
| Zork I - The Great Underground Empire | Infocom | |
| Zork II | Infocom | |
| Zork III - The Dungeon Master | Infocom | |

== See also ==
- Category: Tatung Einstein games
