= SPC-1000 =

Personal computer produced by Samsung

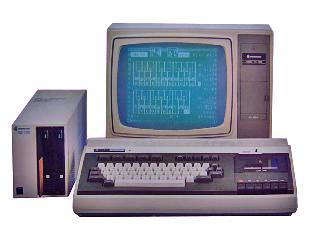
- Developer: Samsung, Hudson Soft
- Manufacturer: Samsung
- Generation: First
- Released: 1983; 43 years ago
- Introductory price: ₩495,000
- Discontinued: 1986; 40 years ago
- Operating system: HuBASIC, CP/M
- CPU: Z80-A @ 4 MHz
- Memory: 64 KB
- Storage: tape, floppy disks
- Display: 128 × 192 in 4 colors, and 256 × 192 in 2 colors, semigraphics in 9 colors
- Graphics: AMI S68047
- Sound: General Instrument AY-3-8910 (3 voices, 8 octaves)
- Input: Keyboard
- Controller input: Gamepad
- Connectivity: 34-pin expansion bus, joystick port, centronics printer port, NTSC video out, RF connection
- Power: 120 V or 240 V
- Dimensions: 48 × 27.5 × 9.5 cm (18.9 × 10.8 × 3.7 inches)

The SPC-1000 is the first personal computer produced by Samsung. It was developed in South Korea, with built-in HuBASIC BASIC written by Hudson Soft in Japan. The computer features a 4 MHz Z80 processor and 64 KB of RAM.

== History ==
The SPC-1000 launched in 1983 as the first personal computer produced by Samsung. The machine was mainly used in education.

== Description ==
The main unit includes the keyboard and a built-in tape recorder. External disk drives, a gamepad, and a dedicated CRT monitor can be connected to this unit. The computer can run CP/M if equipped with double-sided double-density floppy disk drives.

Software was published on cassette tapes, with more than one hundred games and programs. Some games were conversions of popular Arcade games in the early 1980s, adapted to the computer's limitations.

== Features ==
The computer has a Zilog Z80 CPU running at 4 MHz, and 64 KB of RAM. Sound is produced by a General Instrument AY-3-8910 chip, providing 3 voices with 8 octaves each. Video is generated by an AMI S68047 chip (quite similar to the Motorola 6847), offering semigraphics in 9 colors, a 128 × 192 mode in 4 colors, or a 256 × 192 mode in 2 colors.

=== Gallery ===
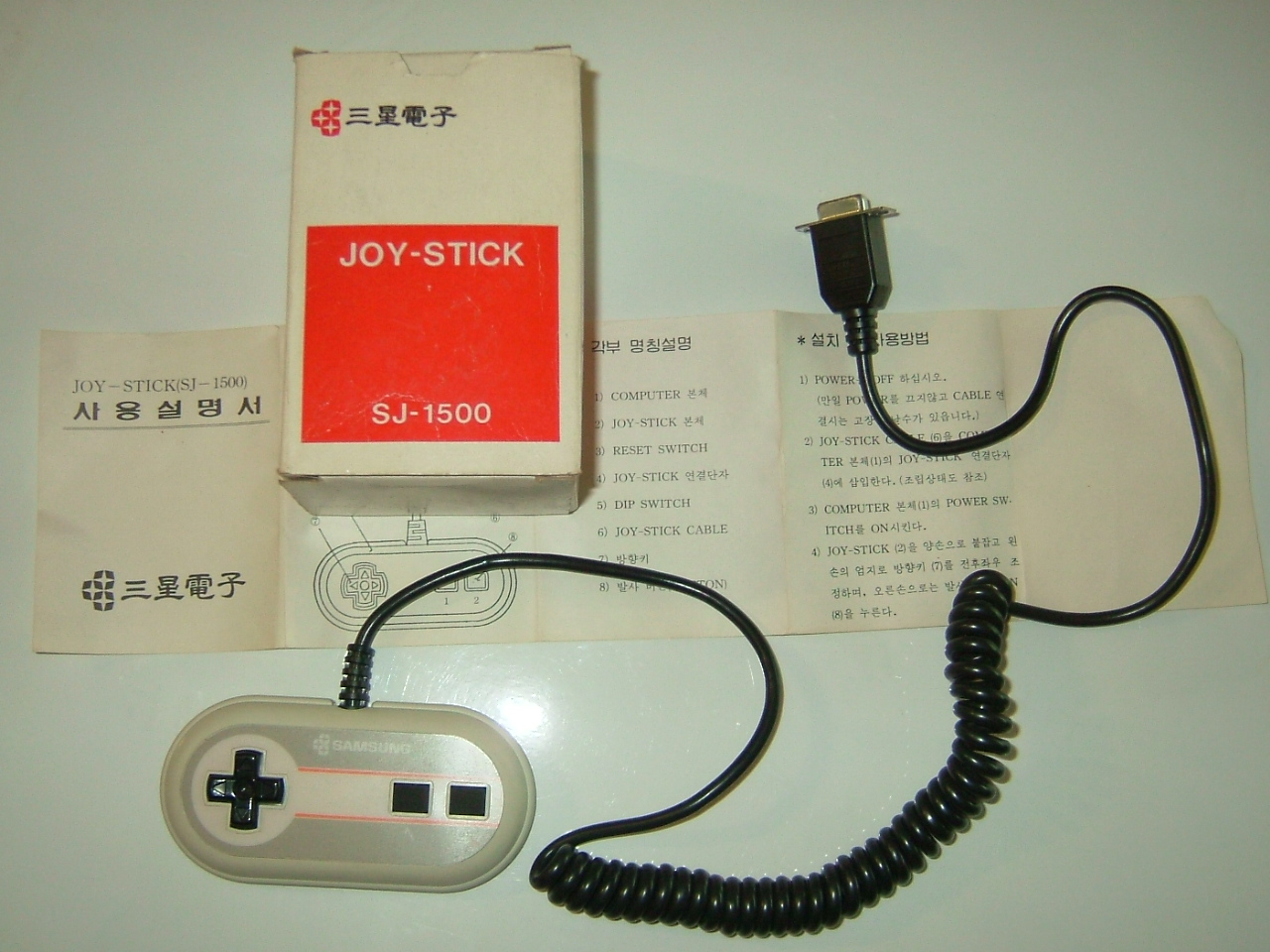
Gamepad for SPC-1000

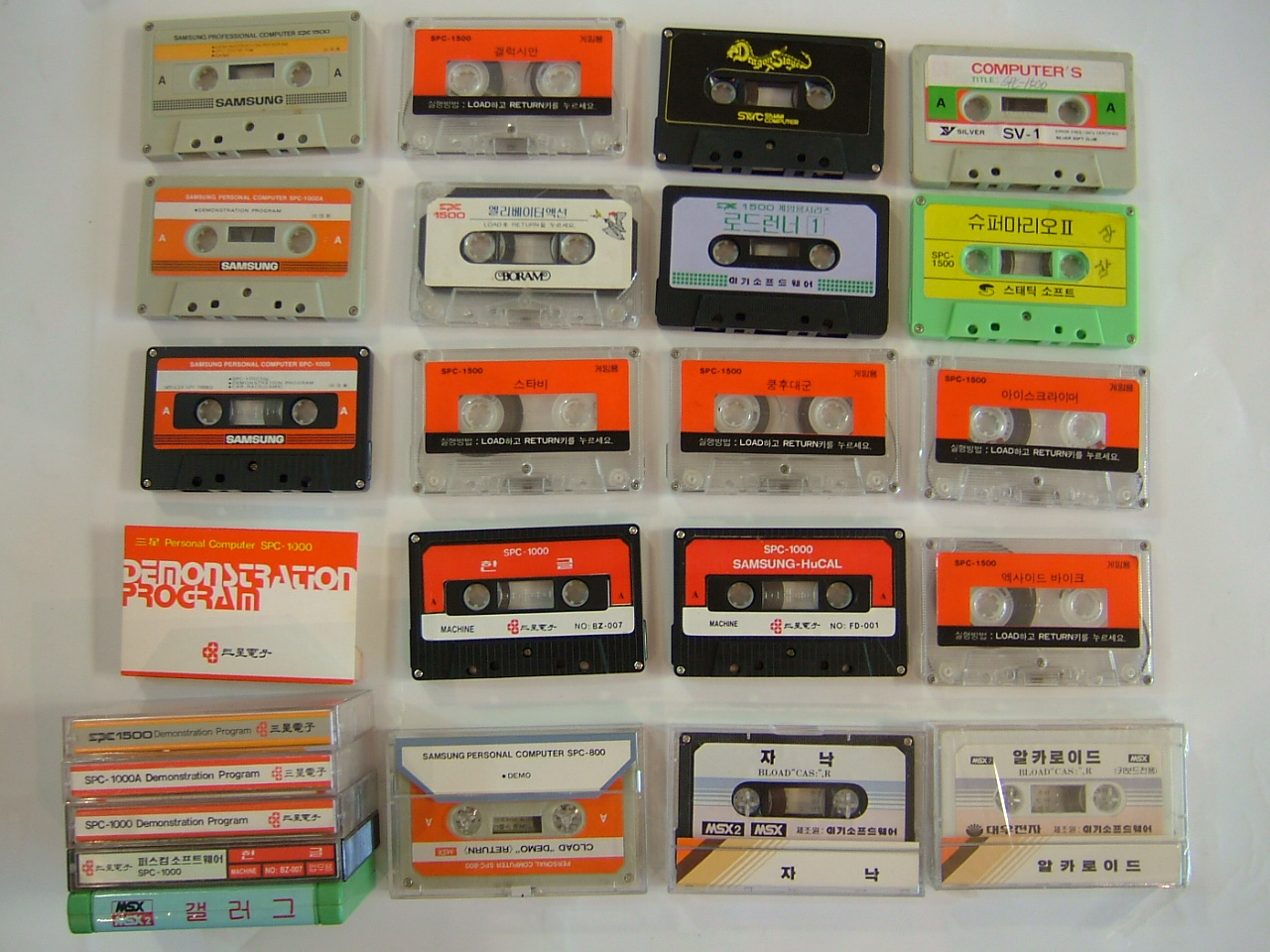
Software cassette tapes for Samsung SPC series

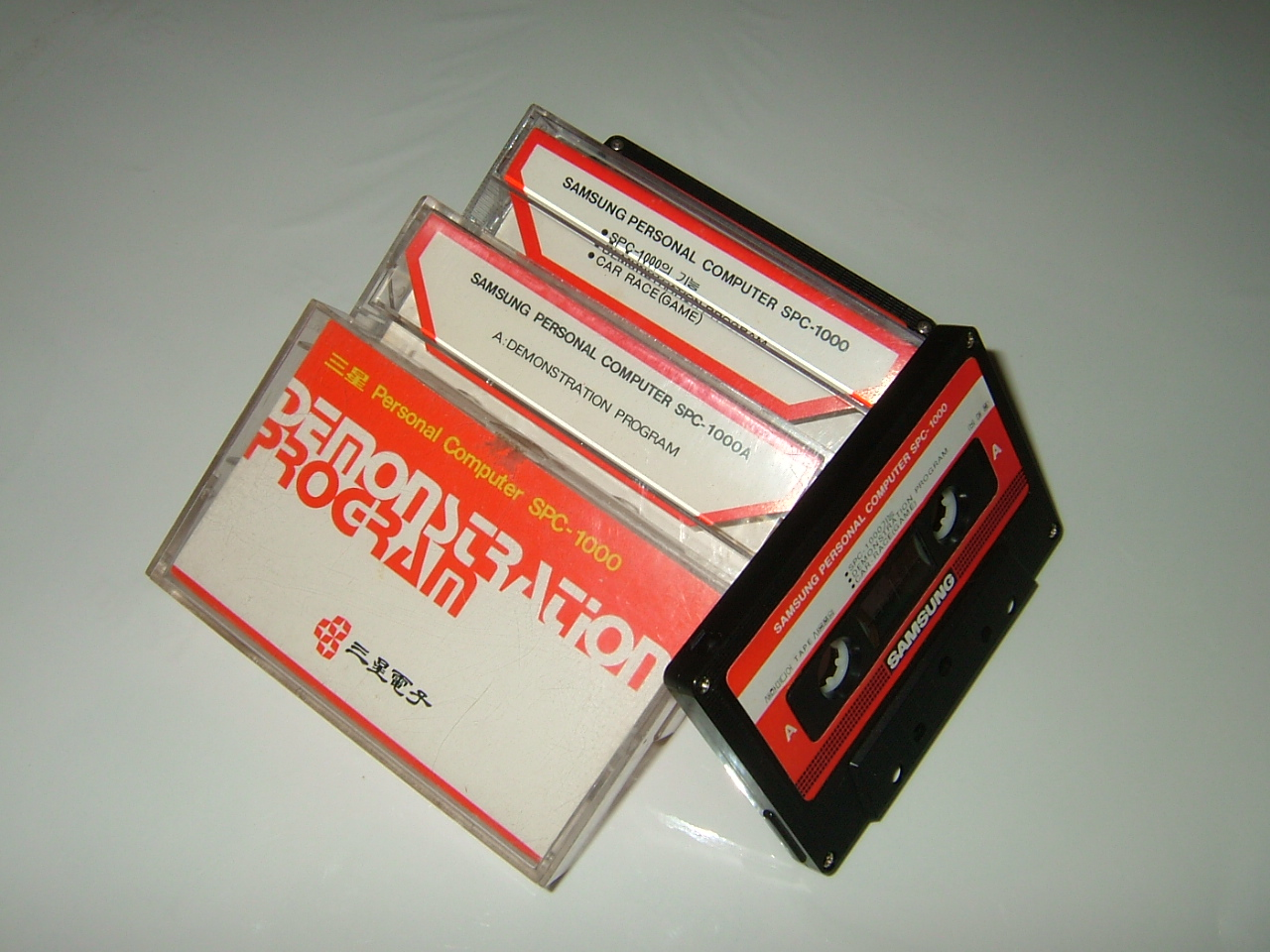
SPC-1000/1000A demonstration program tapes

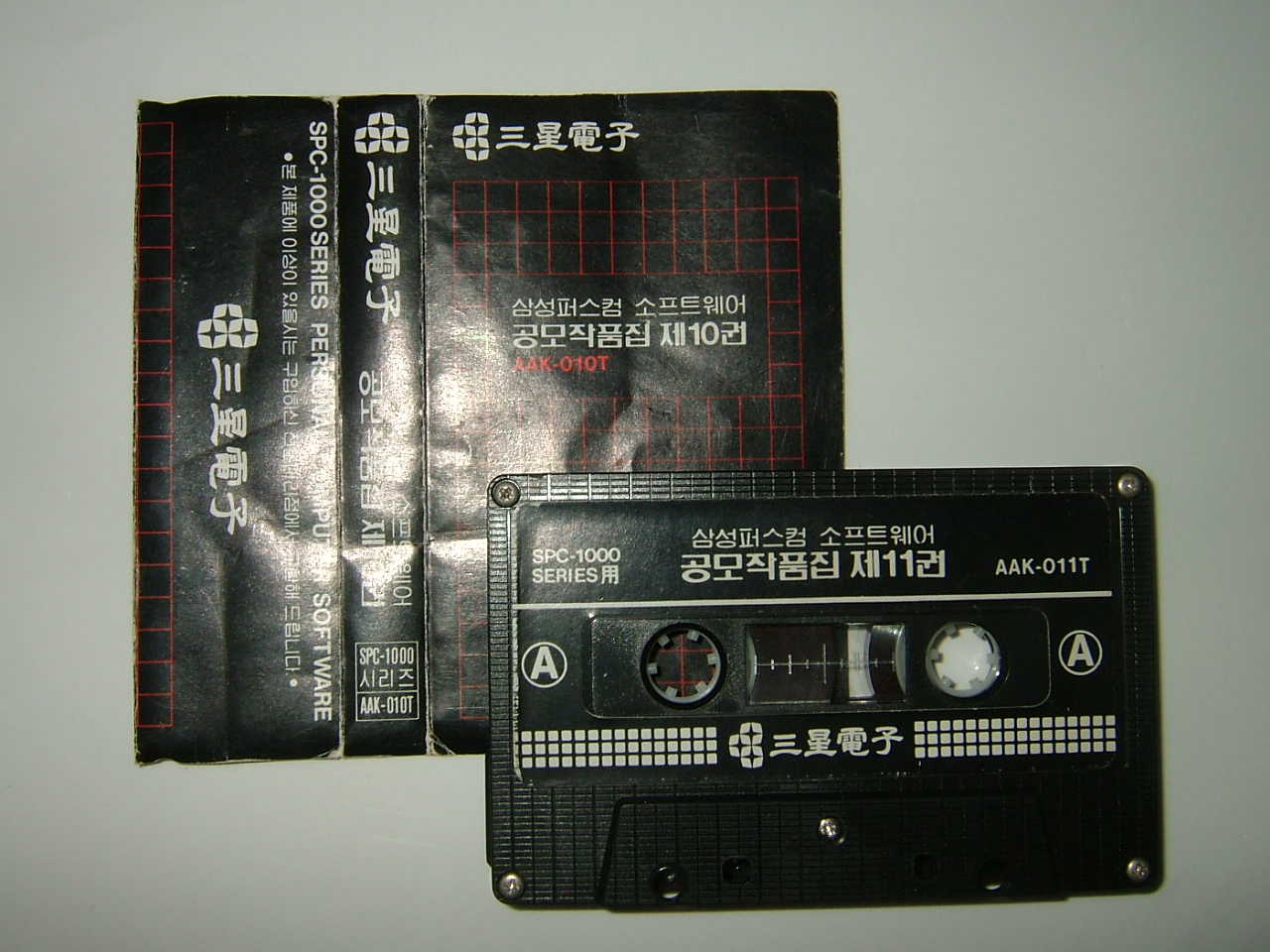
User contest software collection AAK-010T cover and AAK-011T tape

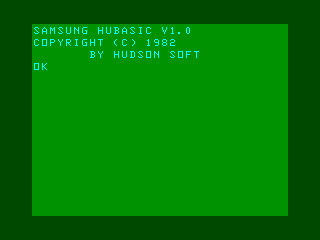
SPC-1000 boot screen

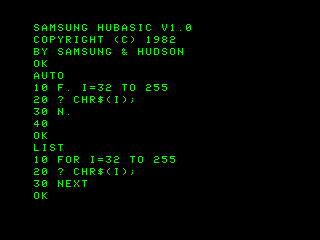
HuBASIC program listing

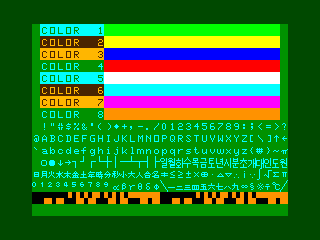
SPC-1000 text and color demonstration

== Video games ==
There are 68 commercial SPC-1000 games on this list.

Title	Release year	Publisher
3D Car Race	198?	Static Soft
Aenni-ui Moheom	198?	Static Soft
Aldebaran Part 1	198?	Samsung Software
Apple Thief	1984	National Soft
Asteroid Belt	1985	Static Soft
AV Armored Vehicle	1986	Sammi Computer
Bazooka	198?	Samsung Software
Block Game	198?	Samsung Software
Bokosuka Wars	198?	Sammi Computer
Bomber Man	198?	Korea Soft Bank
Dang Goo	198?	Sammi Computer
Deep Scan	1984	Static Soft / Samsung
Disneyland	1985	Sammi Computer
Disneyland II	1985	Sammi Computer
Disneyland III	1985	Sammi Computer
Dooli	1987	Softvision
DragonSlayer	198?	Sammi Computer
Eunhaeng Kangdo	198?	Static Soft
Fighter 201	1985	Index
Firia	1986	Static Soft
Fruits Field	198?	Static Soft
Galaga	198?	Static Soft
Gold Cavern	198?	Samsung Software
Gong Sa Pan	198?	Samsung Software
Gongmo Jakpumjip 4-gweon	1985	Samsung Software
Gongsu Daejakjeon & Super Pungseon	198?	Static Soft
Gun Fright	1986	Sammi Computer
Gundam III	1986	Static Soft
Gyeokpa Game	1984	Samsung Software
Hyeongsa Q	198?	Static Soft
IQ 4989	198?	Static Soft
Jeontuham Keenon	198?	Samsung Software
King's Valley	1986	Sammi Computer
Knight Lore	1986	Sammi Computer
Lipstick 2	198?	Sammi Computer
Lunar City	1986	Samsung Software
Lupan	198?	Samsung Software
Mojagabang ~ Hat Bag	198?	Samsung Software
Morse Signal	198?	Samsung Software
Myeongtamjeong Vaveque	1986	Static Soft
Ninja Princess	198?	Sammi Computer
Olion	1984	Softmen
Panzerspitze	1986	Static Soft
Pengo	198?	Samsung Software
Rambo	198?	Sammi Computer
Ratter	198?	Samsung Software
Red Ball	1985	Index
Scramble	198?	Samsung Software
Snack Attack	198?	Samsung Software
Space Mission	198?	Samsung Software
Spy Panic	1985	Charming Soft
Super Lode Runner I	1985	Static Soft
Super Lode Runner II	1986	Static Soft
Super Xevious	1986	Static Soft
The Goonies	1986	Sammi Computer
Thunder Ball	198?	Static Soft
Toiler Adventure	1985	Index
Toiyar	198?	Sammi Computer
Tom & Jerry	1986	Aproman
TwinBee	1986	Static Soft
Uju Jeonjaeng	1984	Samsung Software
Ujuseon Gyeokpa Game	198?	Static Soft
Vela	198?	Sammi Computer
Wizardry	1986	Sammi Computer
Xevious Tiny II	1985	Sammi Computer
Yut Nori	1984	Samsung Software
Zanac	1986	Aproman
Zexas	198?	DB-Soft
