= Clues'o' =

1985 video game

- Developer(s): Imperial Software
- Publisher(s): Imperial Software
- Release: 1985
- Genre(s): Murder mystery game

Clues'o' is a 1985 murder mystery video game developed and published by Imperial Software.

== Plot and gameplay ==
Clues'o' is a game in which the player is a French detective. They must find out who killed Major Fawcett by asking characters around the map.

== Reception ==
The graphics of Clues'o' had mixed reception. D J Robinson reviewed the game for Imagine magazine and stated that the game had "well drawn" graphics and "adequate" text. However, Keith Campbell of Computer & Video Games criticized the overall presentation as "very ordinary".
