= Dina (console) =

Third-generation home video game console

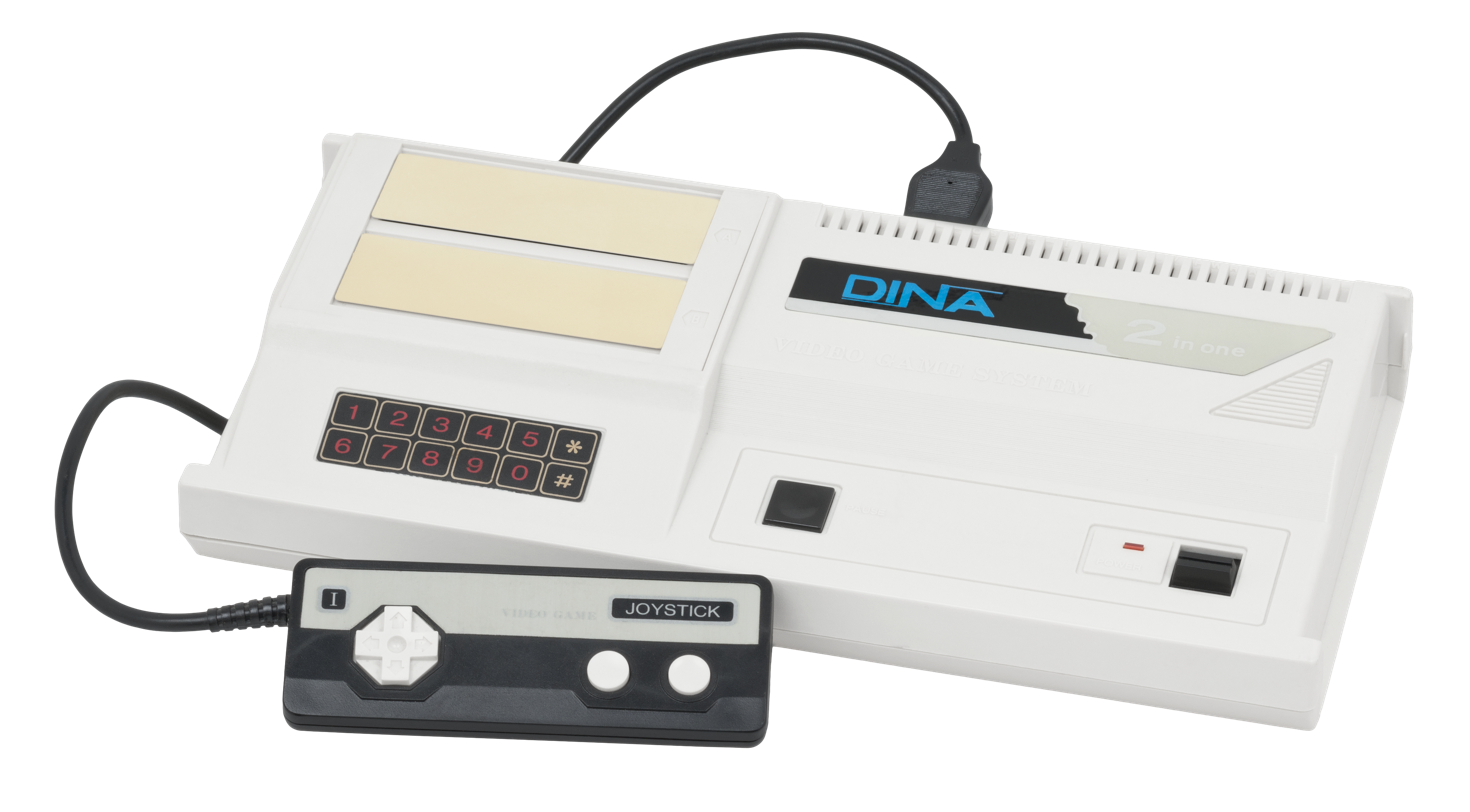
- Manufacturer: Bit Corporation
- Type: Video game console
- Generation: Third generation
- Released: 1986; 40 years ago
- Media: ROM cartridge
- CPU: Zilog Z80
- Graphics: TMS9928A

The Dina, also known in Taiwan as the Chuang Zao Zhe 50 (Chinese:創造者 50), is a home video game console of the third generation originally manufactured by Bit Corporation, later sold in the United States by Telegames as the Telegames Personal Arcade. It is a clone of both the ColecoVision and Sega SG-1000 consoles, with one cartridge slot for each platform, and came bundled with the game Meteoric Shower, which was built into the system. Telegames never advertised its compatibility with the SG-1000.

== Hardware ==
The Dina's controllers are modeled after the D-pad style made famous by the Nintendo Entertainment System. Since the controllers are too small to possess numeric keypads, a single numeric keypad is present on the console itself. The console is not compatible with all ColecoVision cartridges, partly from its lack of a second numeric keypad; any ColecoVision game that requires two keypads cannot be used. A difference in the Dina's controller wiring prevents use of Coleco's Roller Controller and Super Action Controllers and games dependent on either one. Expansion modules for the ColecoVision are also incompatible, as the expansion port uses the pin configuration of the SG-1000. Subsequently, ColecoVision games that rely on expansion modules cannot be used, but the machine is compatible with the SG-1000 keyboard.

The Telegames Personal Arcade was advertised as an alternative to the ColecoVision, leaving the function of the Sega SG-1000 cartridge port unexplained. Despite this, SG-1000 games are completely functional. The console does not have a port for the Sega My Card games, but the "Sega Card Catcher" peripheral is compatible and allows for Sega My Card games to be played.

== Software ==
The Dina came with the game Meteoric Shower built into the unit. The ColecoVision's boot screen is replaced with Japanese writing and the words "1986 BIT CORPORATION" on a green background.
