= Build Your Own Z80 Computer =

- Author: Steve Ciarcia
- Language: English
- Publisher: McGraw-Hill
- Publication date: October 1, 1981
- Pages: 332
- ISBN: 978-0070109629

Build Your Own Z80 Computer: design guidelines and application notes is a book written by Steve Ciarcia, published in 1981 by McGraw-Hill.

The book explains step-by-step the process of building a computer from the ground up, using the Zilog Z80 8-bit microprocessor, including building a power supply, keyboard, and interfaces to a CRT terminal and tape drive.
