= Steve Ciarcia =

Steve Ciarcia is an American embedded control systems engineer. He became popular through his Ciarcia's Circuit Cellar column in BYTE magazine, and later through the Circuit Cellar magazine that he published. He is also the author of Build Your Own Z80 Computer, edited in 1981 and Take My Computer...Please!, published in 1978. He has also compiled seven volumes of his hardware project articles that appeared in BYTE magazine.

In 1982 and 1983, he published a series of articles on building the MPX-16, a 16-bit single-board computer that was hardware-compatible with the IBM PC.

In December 2009, Steve Ciarcia announced that for the American market a strategic cooperation would be entered between Elektor and his Circuit Cellar magazine. In November 2012, Steve Ciarcia announced that he was quitting Circuit Cellar and Elektor would take it over.

In October 2014, Ciarcia purchased Circuit Cellar, audioXpress, Voice Coil, Loudspeaker Industry Sourcebook, and their respective websites, newsletters, and products from Netherlands-based Elektor International Media. The aforementioned magazines will continue to be published by Ciarcia's US-based team.

In July 2016, Steve Ciarcia sold the company to long time employee KC Prescott operating under the company name KCK Media Corp.
