= Soccer (1985 video game) =

1985 video game

- North American NES box art
- Developer: Intelligent Systems
- Publisher: Nintendo
- Producer: Masayuki Uemura
- Composer: Koji Kondo
- Platforms: Nintendo Entertainment System, arcade, Famicom Disk System
- Release: NES: JP: April 9, 1985; NA: March 1987; EU: January 1987; Arcade (VS. Soccer): NA: November 1985; JP: December 1985; Famicom Disk System: JP: February 21, 1986
- Genre: Sports (soccer)
- Modes: Single-player, multiplayer
- Arcade system: Nintendo VS. System

Soccer (Note: Japanese: サッカー, Hepburn: Sakkā) is a soccer video game developed by Intelligent Systems and published by Nintendo for the Nintendo Entertainment System. It was released in Japan and North America in 1985, and in Europe in 1987. An arcade version for the Nintendo VS. System titled VS. Soccer was released the same year. It was released for the Famicom Disk System in 1986. The NES version was released on the Wii and Wii U Virtual Console on June 12, 2014 and on the Nintendo Classics service in 2018, while the arcade version was released by Hamster Corporation as part of their Arcade Archives series for the Nintendo Switch in 2020.

== Gameplay ==
As with real soccer, the objective is to kick the ball into the opponent's goal. The game features cheerleaders and the option of 15, 30, and 45-minutes halves. Pressing B passes the ball, and A shoots at the opponent's goal.

Seven teams are represented: USA, Great Britain, France, West Germany, Brazil, Japan, and Spain.

When beginning a game, the player chooses whether to play with one or two players. The single-player mode is against the computer with five variable difficulty settings. The player chooses between seven teams and sets a time limit of either 15-, 30-, or 45-minute halves. Games begin in the center of a horizontal field, which pans from side to side with player activity. The player closest to the ball controls it and can kick the ball at the push of a button. An indicator over the closest teammate headed in the same direction as the player indicates who can receive a pass. Goal shots can be controlled with a small meter that represents the ball reaching over the goalie's head. Likewise, the player automatically controls the goalie when the opponent makes a goal shot.

== Reception ==
In Japan, Game Machine listed VS. Soccer as the 19th most successful table arcade unit of January 1986. Computer and Video Games said that though every console receives a soccer game, Nintendo's was among the best. They noted the game was somewhat slow and not very attractive, with sparse backgrounds and formless players, but that did not affect the fun. The magazine rated the game 83% overall, with 8/10 for playability and 6/10 for graphics and sound.

== See also ==
- List of association football video games
