= SG-1000 =

Home video game console

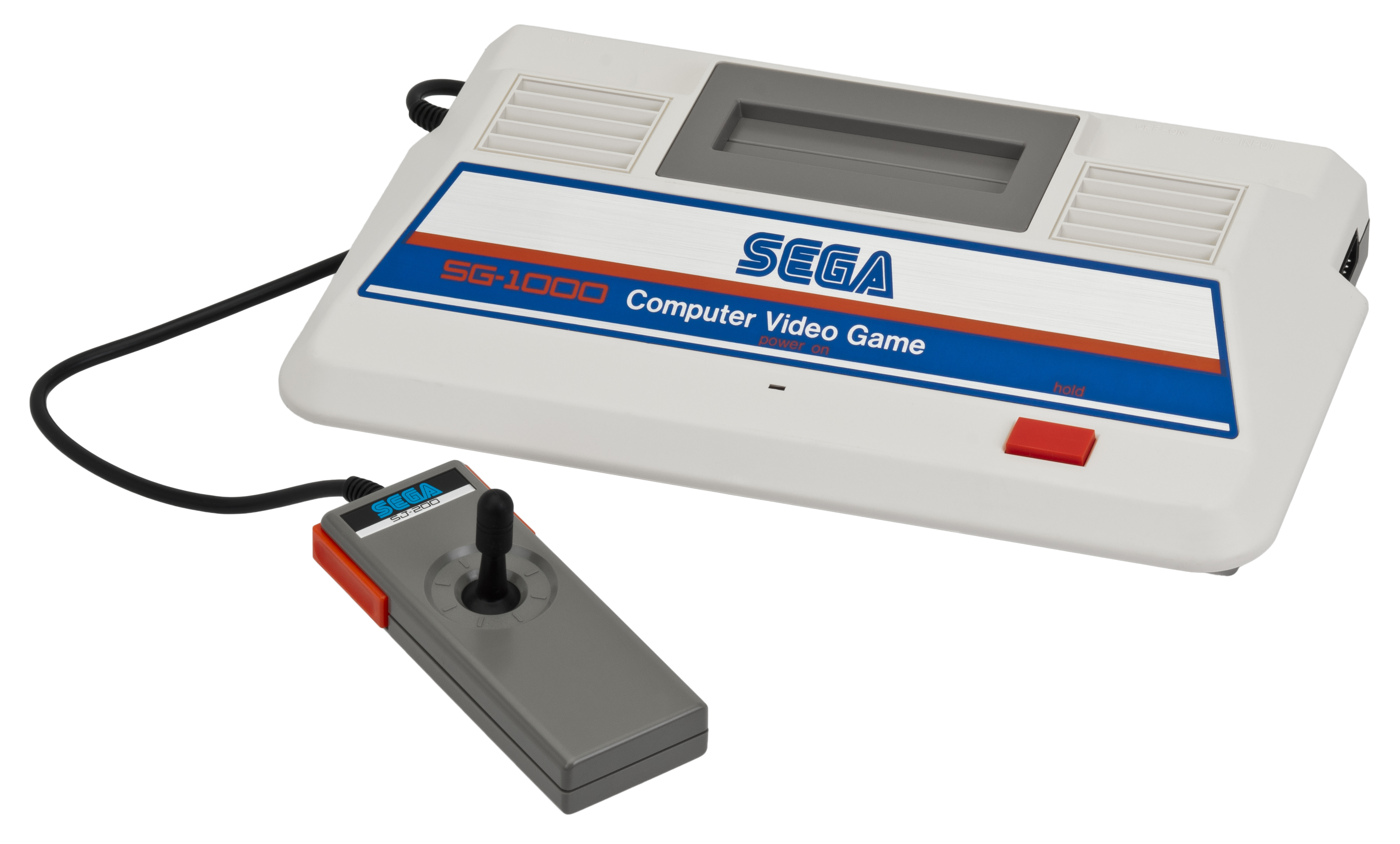
- Manufacturer: Sega
- Type: Home video game console
- Generation: Third
- Released: SG-1000/SC-3000: JP: July 15, 1983; AU: November 1983; SG-1000 II: JP: July 31, 1984; TW: 1986
- Discontinued: SG-1000: JP: July 1984; SG-1000 II: JP: October 1985
- Media: ROM cartridge, compact cassette, Sega My Card
- CPU: Zilog Z80A @ 3.58 MHz
- Memory: 1 KB RAM (SG-1000); 2 KB RAM (SC-3000); 16 KB VRAM
- Display: 256 × 192, 16 colors, 32 sprites
- Graphics: Texas Instruments TMS9918A
- Sound: Texas Instruments SN76489AN
- Successor: Master System

The SG-1000 (Note: Japanese: エスジー・セン, Hepburn: Esu Jī Sen) is a home video game console manufactured by Sega. It was Sega's first entry into the home video game hardware business. Developed in response to a downturn in arcades starting in 1982, the SG-1000 was created on the advice of Hayao Nakayama, president of Sega's Japanese arm, and was released on July 15, 1983, the same day that Nintendo released the Family Computer in Japan. It also had a limited release in Australia and New Zealand.

The SG-1000 was released in several forms, including the SC-3000 computer and the redesigned SG-1000 II (Note: SG-1000 II (エスジー・セン・ツー, Esu Jī Sen Tsū)) released in 1984. The SG-1000 and the SC-3000 both support a library of 51 ROM cartridge games and 29 Sega My Card games. A third iteration of the console, the Mark III (later released worldwide as the Master System), was released in 1985 and provided an improved custom video display processor over previous iterations. All SG-1000 games are fully compatible with the Mark III and the Japanese version of the Master System.

== History ==
SG-1000	SC-3000
SG-1000	SC-3000
SG-1000 II	Sega Mark III
SG-1000 II	Sega Mark III

In the early 1980s, Sega Enterprises, Inc., then a subsidiary of Gulf and Western Industries, was one of the top five arcade game manufacturers active in the United States, as company revenues rose to $214 million. A downturn in the arcade business starting in 1982 seriously hurt the company, leading Gulf and Western to sell its North American arcade manufacturing organization and the licensing rights for its arcade games to Bally Manufacturing. The company retained Sega's North American R&D operation, as well as its Japanese subsidiary, Sega Enterprises, Ltd. With its arcade business in decline, Sega Enterprises, Ltd. president Hayao Nakayama advocated that the company leverage its hardware expertise to move into the home console market in Japan, which was in its infancy at the time. Nakayama received permission to proceed.

The first model to be developed was the SC-3000, a computer with a built-in keyboard, but when Sega learned of Nintendo's plans to release a games-only console, they began developing the SG-1000 alongside the SC-3000. The "SG" in the console's name is an abbreviation for "Sega Game", and the console is also sometimes referred to as the "Mark I". To keep costs down while ensuring sufficient longevity, Sega opted to create the platform from popular off-the-shelf components.

The SG-1000 was first released in Japan on July 15, 1983, at ¥15,000. It was released on the same day as Nintendo launched the Family Computer (Famicom) in Japan. It was released simultaneously with the SC-3000, as well as the upgraded SC-3000H. Though Sega themselves only released the SG-1000 in Japan, rebranded versions were released in several other markets worldwide. In November that same year as the Japanese version, the SC-3000 was released in Australia through John Sands Electronics and in New Zealand by Grandstand Leisure. The console also saw a release in France, Italy, and Spain, but was not released in the larger video game markets of the United States, United Kingdom, or Germany. Despite this, an unauthorized clone system known as the Telegames Personal Arcade was produced and made available in the United States and Taiwan, and is able to play SG-1000 and ColecoVision games. An additional release of the SG-1000 in Taiwan was done by Aaronix. The console enjoyed a brief period of popularity in Taiwan before the market was taken over by cheaper Famicom clones.

Due in part to the SG-1000's steadier stream of releases (21 SG-1000 games by the end of 1983, as compared to only 9 Famicom games), and in part to a recall on Famicom units necessitated by a faulty circuit, the SG-1000 sold 160,000 units in 1983, far exceeding Sega's projection of 50,000. Former Sega consumer hardware development head Hideki Sato stated that because Sega had not predicted the SG-1000 would sell so well, the company became more enamored with developing video game consoles. Despite this, the three launch games, all of which were ported from Sega's VIC dual-arcade board, lacked the name recognition of Famicom launch games Donkey Kong, Donkey Kong Jr., and Popeye. Shortly after launch, Gulf and Western began to divest itself of its non-core businesses after the death of company founder Charles Bluhdorn, so Nakayama and former Sega CEO David Rosen arranged a management buyout of the Japanese subsidiary in 1984 with financial backing from CSK Corporation, a prominent Japanese software company. Nakayama was then installed as CEO of the new Sega Enterprises, Ltd.

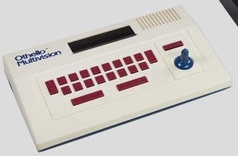
Othello Multivision, a console based on SC-3000 and SG-1000 hardware, by Tsukuda Original Co., Ltd.

Following the buyout, Sega released another console, the SG-1000 II, on July 31, 1984, at ¥15,000. It is sometimes referred to as the "SG-1000 Mark II". The SG-1000 II replaced the hardwired joystick with two detachable joypads. Sato disliked the original cartridges, saying they looked like "small black tombstones" when inserted in the console, and later remarked that his proudest achievement of the SG-1000 era was replacing them with the "cheerier", pocket-sized Sega My Cards. Sega also employed popular owarai comedy duo Tunnels to provide celebrity endorsement for the console. Japanese company, Tsukuda Original Co., Ltd. created the Othello Multivision, based around the SC-3000 and SG-1000 hardware.

By 1984, the Famicom's success began to outpace the SG-1000. The Famicom had more advanced hardware, allowing it to perform smoother scrolling and more colorful sprites, and Nintendo boosted its games library by courting third-party developers, whereas Sega was less than eager to collaborate with the same companies they were competing with in arcades. The SG-1000 was also coming up against game consoles from companies including Tomy and Bandai. This would result in the release of the Sega Mark III in Japan in 1985, which later became the Master System worldwide. According to Sato, the Mark III was released because of the limitations of the Texas Instruments TMS9918A graphics chip in the SG-1000, which did not have the power for the kinds of games Sega wanted to make. In its place, the Mark III uses an in-house graphics chip based around the unit in Sega's System 2 arcade system board.

== Technical specifications ==
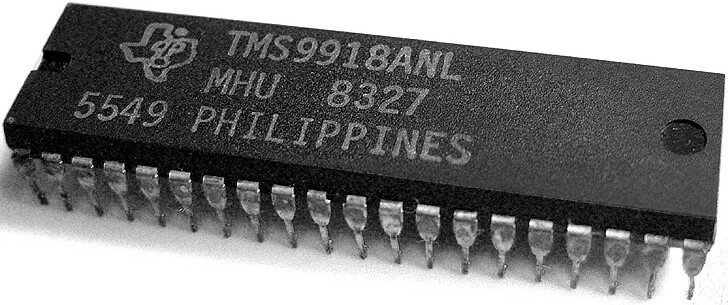
TMS9918A video display processor, as used in the SG-1000

The SG-1000 is powered by an 8-bit Zilog Z80A central processing unit rated for 4 MHz, but runs at 3.58 MHz. Its Video Display Processor (VDP) is a Texas Instruments TMS9918A, capable of displaying up to 15 colors, and its sound processor is a Texas Instruments SN76489AN. The system includes 8 kbit (1 KB) of main RAM, and 128 kbit (16 KB) of video RAM (VRAM). The controller is hardwired to the system in the original model, and detachable in the SG-1000 II. Video and audio output are supplied through an RF switch. Power is supplied through a 9 V DC connector connected to an AC adapter.

The SC-3000 includes hardware nearly identical to the SG-1000, but includes a built-in rubber keyboard and 16 kbit (2 KB) of main RAM. The SC-3000H retains the same technical specifications as the SC-3000, but uses a plastic keyboard instead and includes some altered keycaps. BASIC cartridges containing up to 32 KB of additional RAM were available.

Several peripherals exist for the SG-1000 series. Available at ¥13,800 at its time of release, the SK-1100 keyboard connects through the expansion slot and is compatible with all models. Multiple controllers were created, including the SJ-200 joystick attached to the SG-1000, and the SJ-150 joypad, made for use with the SG-1000 II. A racing wheel known as the SH-400 was made for use with games such as Monaco GP. The C-1000 Card Catcher, sold at ¥1,000, allows players to play Sega My Card titles. Additional accessories existed solely for use with the SC-3000, including the SR-1000 cassette deck, the SP-400 4-color plotter printer, and the SF-7000 expansion device which adds a floppy disk drive and additional memory.

== Game library ==
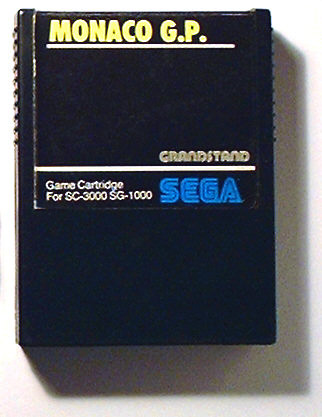
Monaco GP cartridge

Girl's Garden, developed by Yuji Naka

Sega's software library for the SG-1000 and SC-3000 consists of 51 game cartridges, which includes both licensed titles from Sega and also the titles released for the licensed console from Tsukuda Original Co., Ltd. called the Othello Multivision, as well as 29 Sega My Card releases that required the Card Catcher add-on. (Note: 5 of which are reissued versions of games that came out on cartridges.) There were also 26 educational and programming cartridges for the SC-3000 that could only be played on the SG-1000 with the SK-1100 keyboard peripheral. Titles for the system include Flicky, Congo Bongo, Sega-Galaga, and Girl's Garden, the first video game programmed by Sonic the Hedgehog developer Yuji Naka. The library included licensed titles, such as Golgo 13. Packaging and game manuals came with both Japanese and English text until 1984, when manuals were switched to Japanese only and the size of the cartridge box was reduced. Hideki Sato stated that Sega lacked adequate staff to develop games for the console at the time. SC-3000/SG-1000 games were continued to be produced after the launch of the Mark III in 1985. The last two SC-3000/SG-1000 cartridge games were The Castle in 1986 and Loretta no Shōzō: Sherlock Holmes on February 18, 1987. The final Sega My Card game for the SC-3000/SG-1000 was The Black Onyx, also in 1987. In 2006, the GameTap subscription gaming service added an emulator of the SG-1000, and several playable titles.

== Reception ==
The SG-1000 console series (including the Mark III) sold over 1.4 million units in Japan as of 1988, with the original SG-1000 model having sold 400,000 units in Japan. The SC-3000 home computer model sold 120,000 units in Japan during 1983, and went on to sell about 300,000 units worldwide.

The SG-1000 made little impact on the video game industry, but has been recognized for being Sega's first video game console. Retro Gamer writer Damien McFerran said it was an "abject failure", but called it and the SG-1000 II "the Japanese forefathers of the Master System". Writing for Wired, Chris Kohler criticized the poor response of the controller's joystick and the lack of an RCA output. He said the release timing hurt its success; "[al]though its graphics were of better quality than most consoles on the market, it had the bad luck to be released in the same month as Nintendo's world-changing Famicom, which had killer apps like Donkey Kong and could run circles around Sega's hardware." Of its legacy, Kohler said, "Few have heard of it, even fewer have played it, and the games weren't that great anyway." By contrast, Luke Plunkett of Kotaku recognized that "while all this makes it sound like the SG-1000 was a bit of a misfire, it was still important in the development of Sega's home console business."

Hideki Sato reflected positively on the innovations in the development of the SG-1000, but admitted that the console had limitations because of how new the market was and that Sega was inexperienced in developing for a video game console at the time. According to Sato, "The problem was, while we knew how to make arcade games, we didn't really know anything about console development. In fact, the very idea of a "consumer" market for video games was unheard of then: back then it was just a 'new business' idea."
