= Hanimex =

Defunct Australian photographic equipment distributor

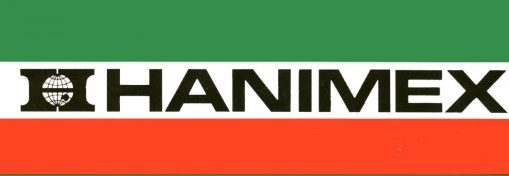
- Founded: 1947; 79 years ago
- Founder: Jack Hannes
- Defunct: April 23, 2004
- Fate: Became FujiFilm Australia, Hanimex name discontinued
- Successor: FujiFilm Australia Pty Ltd.
- Website: Hanimex Australia at the Wayback Machine (archived 2004-03-27)

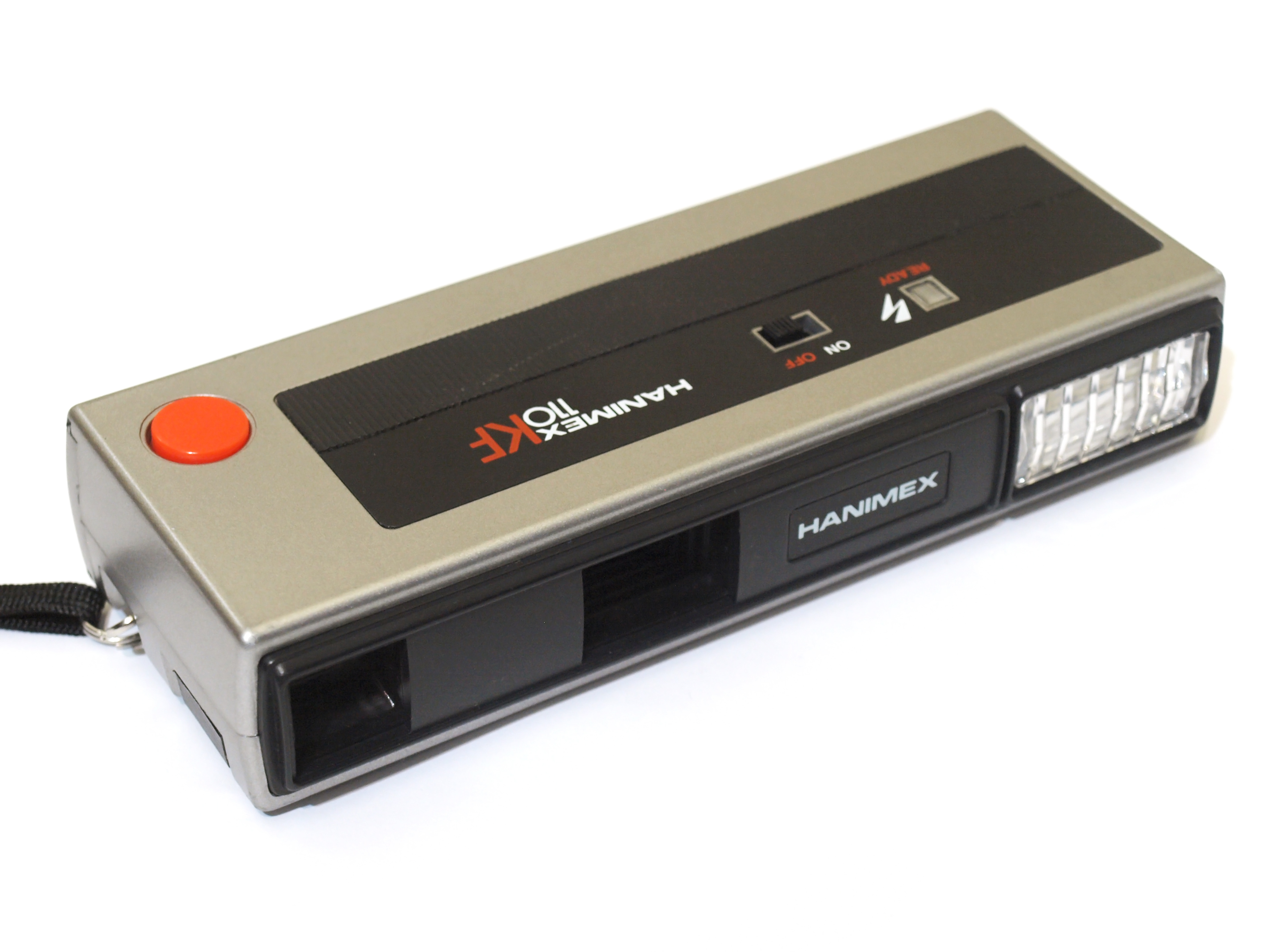
Hanimex 110 KF pocket camera

Hanimex was an Australian distributor and manufacturer, primarily associated with photographic equipment. In the 1970s and 80s it also produced cassette recorders and home videogame consoles.

== History ==
=== Early years ===
The company was founded by Jack Hannes (1923-2005). Born in Germany and educated in England, Hannes' family fled Germany for Australia in 1939. After becoming involved in the import of photographic products in the years following the end of World War II, Hannes formed Hanimex (an abbreviation of "HANnes" "IMport" "EXport") in 1947.

Hanimex was the sole distributor of Fujifilm products in Australia from 1954 until Fujifilm themselves purchased the company in 2004.

=== Growth ===
In the mid-1950s, Australian import restrictions led Hanimex to begin manufacturing projectors there locally, and by the early 1970s it was the second-largest manufacturer of slide projectors in the world.

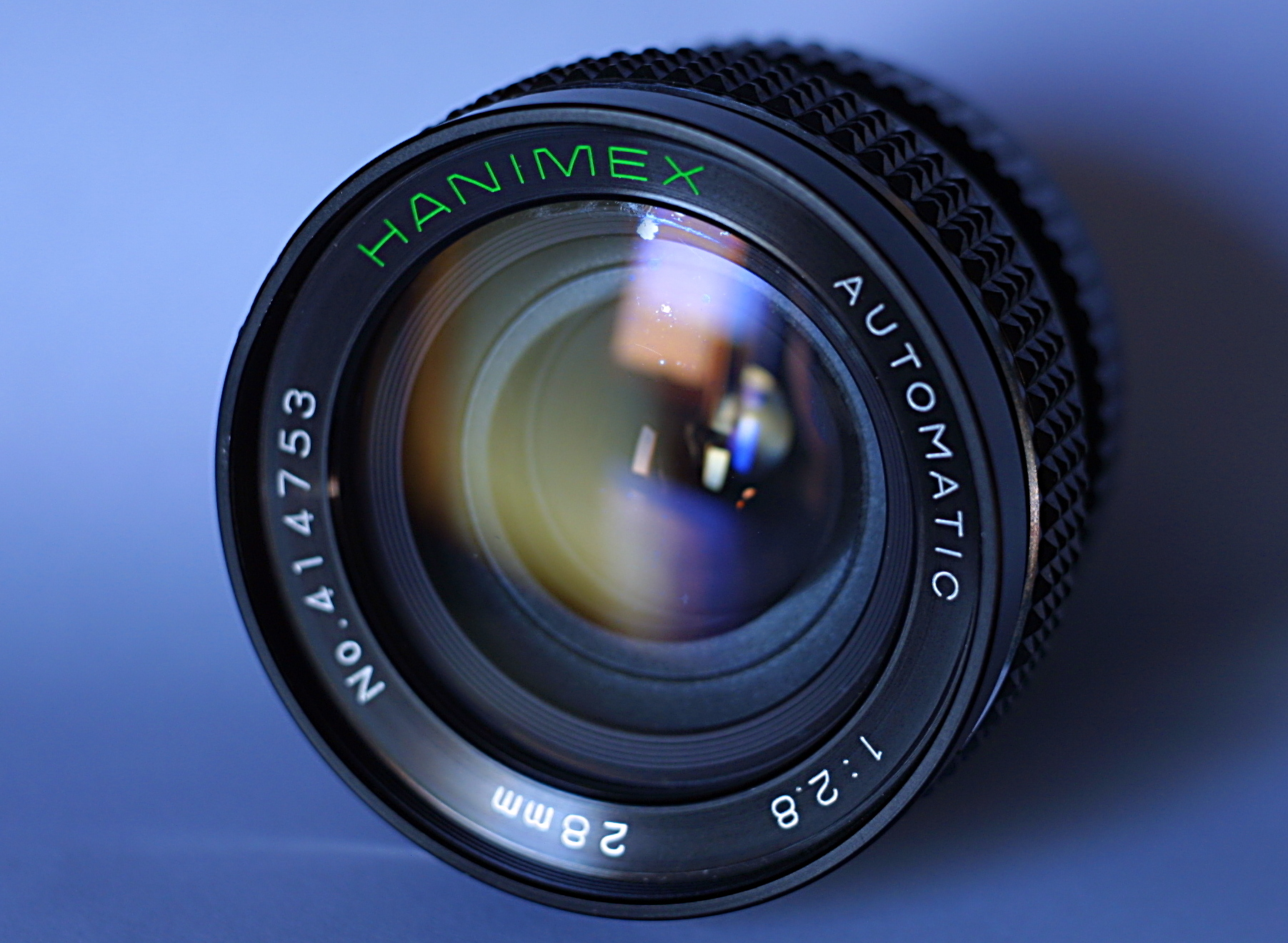
Hanimex-branded 28mm camera lens

Hanimex distributed cameras from a large number of manufacturers under its own name, including those of Praktica, Topcon and others, and eventually grew influential enough to move beyond simple rebranding and into having significant input into the design of such products.

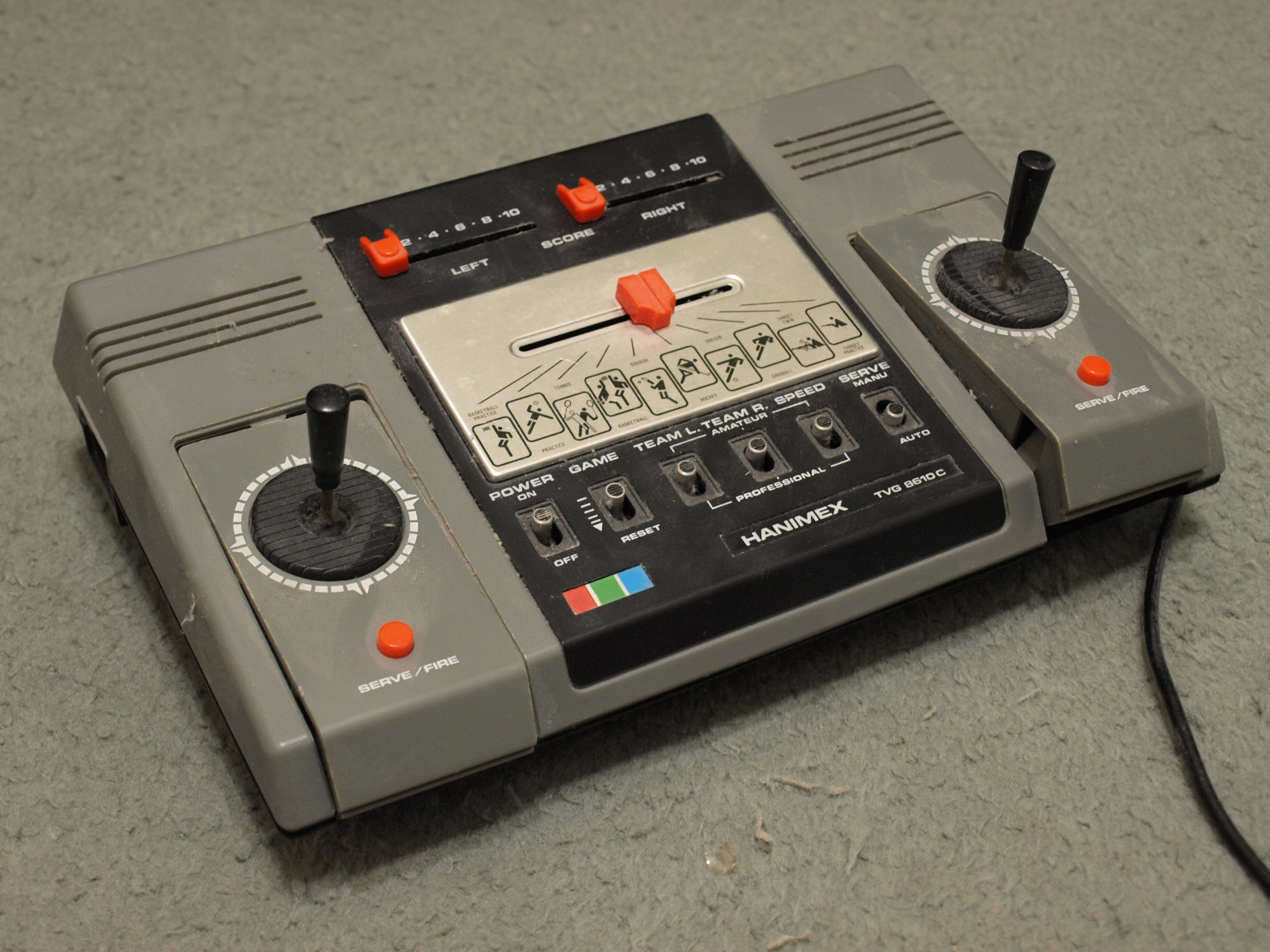
Hanimex "pong-style" dedicated games console

During the late 1970s and early 1980s, Hanimex also sold several Pong-style video games consoles (including rebadged designs from Hong Kong manufacturer Soundic) as well as the "Hanimex Pencil II" home computer (also designed by Soundic).

==== Cassette recorders and related products ====
In August 1971, the company introduced the HC-1000. This was a portable battery operated cassette recorder featuring microphone compartment, carry handle and auxiliary input as well as mains adaptor. The machine was promoted throughout the UK during 1972 as a reduced price offer at petrol stations with 6 vouchers required to secure the offer. It was sold along with an EMI-produced 'musicassette'. As the equipment was very basic (made using plastic) and the market was awash with other manufacturers i.e. Philips, Bush, and ITT manufacturing similar, and better quality, equipment, the model ceased production after just 12 months in August 1972. However, during the early 1970s further models were also manufactured by Hanimex including the HC-2000, HC-2040 cassette recorders and the CT-3030 cassette tape player followed by the HRC (Hanimex Radio Cassette) Model 5020, an 8-Track Stereo Cartridge with AM/FM Receiver and digital Digital Alarm Clock. In 1974 a further production release was the HRC-5070 an AM/FM Radio Cassette Player. Many of the products were made in Korea to reduce manufacturing costs.

=== Resignation of Hannes and later years ===
Jack Hannes was awarded the Queens medal for services to Australian industry, and was the recipient of a lifetime achievement award from the Japanese Photo Industry Association for promoting international friendship and prosperity. He resigned from the company in 1982 following disagreements with a board appointed by its then-majority shareholder that prevented him from running it as he wished. In 2005, while on holiday in Switzerland, Hannes died aged 81.

In 1985, Hanimex purchased Vivitar.

In 1989, Hanimex was purchased by Gestetner, which was in turn taken over by Ricoh in 1995.

In 2004, Fujifilm bought Hanimex from Ricoh, following which it became known as FujiFilm Australia Pty Ltd. and the Hanimex name was discontinued.

== See also ==
- Hanimex lenses for Pentax K-mount
