= Planet Patrol (video game) =

1982 video game

- Official box art
- Publisher: Spectravision
- Platform: Atari 2600
- Release: NA: June 1982; PAL: Early 1983
- Genre: Horizontally scrolling shooter
- Modes: Single-player, multiplayer

Planet Patrol is a 1982 horizontally scrolling shooter video game published by Spectravision for the Atari 2600. Players control a space ship sent to the fictional planet Spectra, tasked with destroying missile bases and rescuing stranded pilots. It is considered notable for scrolling from right to left, an usual arrangement some critics find to be disorientating. It also features a day and night cycle, with every other stage placed in the dark. It was one of first two games published by Spectravision, along with Gangster Alley, and one of the first five they published in Europe.

Critics had mixed opinions on Planet Patrol's gameplay and graphics. Some praised the graphics heavily, especially the backgrounds and day and night cycle. While others thought they could only be made up for by the exciting gameplay. Still others thought the gameplay was shallow and likely to get boring quickly, the lack of mobility a common criticism. One reviewer criticized the night stages for featuring "headache inducing" flashing.

== Gameplay ==
Planet Patrol is a horizontally scrolling shooter with a science fiction theme that exclusively scrolls right to left. Players control a spaceship sent to the planet Spectra to destroy enemy missile bases. While enemy ships (known as troublesome invading aliens or TIAs) fly past the player, their ship is stuck on one vertical axis and cannot be sped up or moved forward or backward. Enemies travel in straight lines going left to right. Near the end of a round, players get a chance to save a stranded pilot and destroy three missile bases. If they do not destroy the bases, they are destroyed by a force field. There is also a fuel gauge which can be refilled at the end of each round. Every other round, day turns into night and enemy space craft can only be seen briefly while the player fires a shot. There is a children's mode and an advanced mode along with a two player variation.

The player ship in white travels left past enemy ships in red. The transition to nighttime begins in the background.

== Release ==
Spectravision first announced Planet Patrol, along with Gangster Alley, at Summer CES in June 1982. Both games were shipped within two weeks of the event. They were designed by an in-house studio. It was released in Europe in early 1983, including the United Kingdom,, West Germany, France,, and Italy. Spectravision would later be renamed to Spectravideo, and develop the SV-318 home computer, a predecessor the Japanese MSX computer standard.

== Reception ==
Critics were mixed on Planet Patrol's graphics and sound. In Electronic Fun with Computers & Games, Frank Lovece thought it had "exceptional graphics", good pacing, and a designer who "must've devoured Frank Herbert's Dune trilogy in one sitting." Italian magazine Videogiochi was also impressed by the visuals. Electronic Games thought the sound and graphics were not "the most sophisticated available" but the intensity of the action makes up for that. French magazine Tilt also thought the gameplay makes up for poor sound and graphics. Joystik magazine called it "an involving fly-and-shoot space game with good, but not spectacular graphics." They considered the nighttime combat a nice touch.

Perry Greenberg in Video Games said it has "interesting variations" and called the nighttime flying "exciting". German magazine TeleMatch thought it could just as well have been a skiing game, and thought it was exciting but not outstanding game. TV Gamer thought it was a well thought out "very good space game." The Book of Atari Sotware called it a "challenger" that "will hold your interest for a while."

The Video Game Update did not recommend the game, considering the graphics "average" and the gameplay "likely to get boring after a while." They also considered the direction of travel from right to left disorienting. In 2007, Brett Weiss was very critical of the experience, calling it "shallow to the core", with "decent enough" graphics, "redundant" sound effects, "choppy" scrolling, "restrictive" gameplay, and "headache-inducing" flashing.

== See also ==
- List of Atari 2600 games
