= Gangster Alley =

1982 video game

- Official box art
- Publisher: Spectravision
- Platform: Atari 2600
- Release: NA: June 1982; PAL: Early 1983
- Genre: Shooting gallery
- Modes: Single-player, multiplayer

Gangster Alley is a 1982 shooting gallery video game published by Spectravision for the Atari 2600. Players control a federal agent in a shootout with five gangsters, who poke their heads out from windows. A gangster named Nitro Ed looms at the top and threatens to drop a bomb, ending the game instantly. It was one of the first two games published by Spectravision, along with Planet Patrol, and one of the first five they published in Europe.

A number of critics criticized the game for its simplicity, expecting that players would grow bored and abandon the game quickly. Other critics were offended by the violent gameplay, especially in juxtapositon to the young target demographic. One publication applauded its comic book-like characters. While it is often compared to other shooting gallery video games such as Hogan's Alley, the lack of a light gun control system stands out to retrospective reviewers.

== Gameplay ==
Gangster Alley is a first-person shooting gallery video game. Players take the role of an agent of the Spectravision Bureau of Ivestigation (SBI), and are tasked with shooting down a crew of gangsters in their hideout. The gangsters are named Shifty, Scar Face, Mugsy, Lefty, and Nitro Ed. Players control a cross-hair which is used to aim a rifle with 24 rounds of ammunition. Gangsters slowly peak their heads out from windows, along with two hostages which lose the player points if shot. If gangsters aren't shot fast enough, they shot back at the player removing one of four safety vests. Once all vests are gone, the game is over. Nitro Ed moves back and forth at the top of the screen and occasionally holds up a bomb. If he isn't shot before dropping the bomb, the game ends immediately. Later stages are set at night, and the playfield can only be viewed by firing rifle shots. It can be player either one player of two player and there is a children's mode.

Gangsters and civilians poke their heads out from windows while Nitro Ed holds a bomb above his head.

== Release ==
Spectravision first announced Gangster Alley, along with Planet Patrol, at Summer CES in June 1982. Both games were shipped within two weeks of the event. Gangster Alley was designed by an in-house studio. It was released in Europe in early 1983, including the United Kingdom,, West Germany, France,, and Italy. Spectravision would later be renamed to Spectravideo, and develop the SV-318 home computer, a predecessor the Japanese MSX computer standard.

In 1987, Froggo Games released a graphically altered version called Task Force. It is similar in appearance to a version called Mafia released by Suntek.

== Reception ==
Electronic Games called Gangster Alley "an interesting idea that lacks juice." It was considered "a commendable effort" but criticized for being too simple to hold anyone's attention for any length of time. TV Gamer said it was "nicely done but a bit boring after a while." Italian magazine Videogiochi liked the game for its original, well structured theme and comic book-like visuals, thought they admitted it might not have much longevity.

Perry Greenberg in Video Games wrote that "it was no Missile Command" though it does "have its charms." He described it as "too much work for my worn reflexes." The Book of Atari Sotware gave it a B ranking. In 2007, Brett Weiss thought the characters had an "interesting look" and that it might be enjoyable to Hogan's Alley fans. But he thought it would have worked better with a light gun.

The Video Game Update did not recommend it. They thought parents would object to young kids playing a game involving shooting human figures and thought the graphics got boring quickly. German magazine TeleMatch was offended by the game's violent themes and thought it was embarrassing a company would choose to distribute it in West Germany. Joystik said it was "violent, but entertaining" and gave it three out of five stars.

== See also ==
- List of Atari 2600 games
