= Basic programming =

Basic programming may refer to:

- Basic television programming, the set of channels included in basic subscription to satellite or cable television.
- Programming in one of the BASIC programming languages.
  - BASIC Programming, cartridge for the Atari 2600 console, released in 1979.
