= Smart TV =

TV set with integrated Internet features

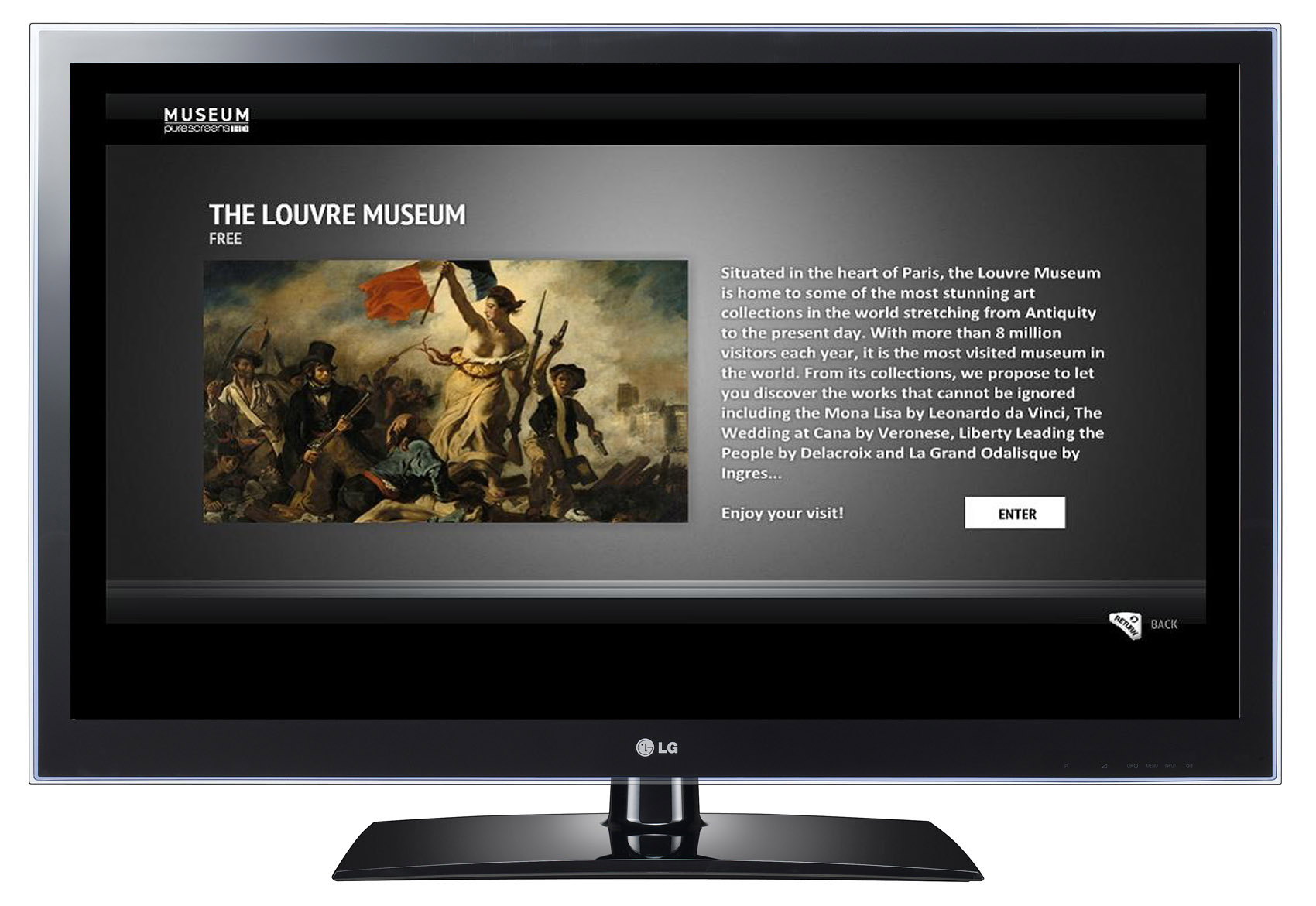
LG Electronics smart TV from 2011

A smart TV, also known as a connected TV (CTV, or rarely, CoTV), (Note: "CoTV" is used primarily by Bell Media in Canada, to distinguish from its CTV Television Network and other CTV-branded services.) is a traditional television set with integrated internet and interactive Web 2.0 features that allow users to stream music and videos, browse the internet, and view photos. Smart TVs are a technological convergence of computers, televisions, and digital media players. Besides the traditional functions of television sets provided through traditional broadcasting media, these devices can provide access to over-the-top media services such as streaming television and internet radio, along with home networking access.

Smart TV is different from Internet TV, IPTV, or streaming television. Internet TV refers to receiving television content over the Internet instead of traditional systems such as terrestrial, cable, and satellite, regardless of how the Internet is delivered. IPTV is one of the Internet television technology standards for use by television broadcasters. Streaming television is a term used for programs created by many producers for showing on Internet TV.

In smart TVs, the operating system is preloaded into the television set's firmware, which provides access to apps and other digital content. In contrast, traditional televisions primarily act as displays and are limited to vendor-specific customization. The software applications, "apps", can be preloaded into the device or updated or installed on demand via an application store or marketplace, in a manner similar to how applications are integrated into modern smartphones.

The technology that enables smart TVs is also incorporated into external devices such as set-top boxes and some Blu-ray players, game consoles, digital media players, hotel television systems, smartphones, and other network-connected interactive devices that utilise television-type display outputs. These devices allow viewers to find and play videos, movies, TV shows, photos, and other content from the Web, cable or satellite TV channels, or a local storage device.

== Definition ==
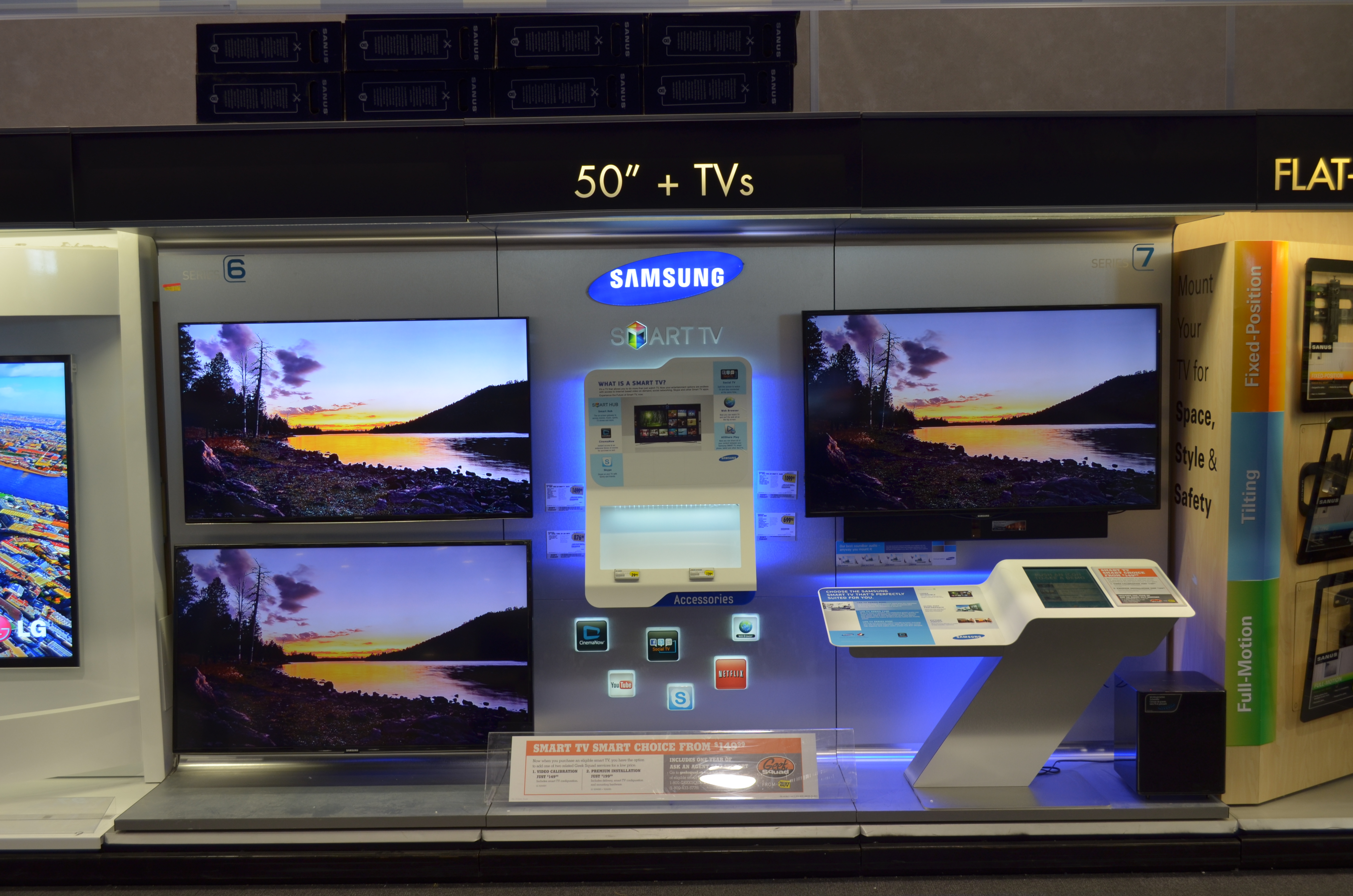
Samsung Smart TVs on display

A smart TV device is either a television set with integrated Internet capabilities or a set-top box for television that offers more advanced computing ability and connectivity than a contemporary basic television set. A smart TV is an information appliance and may be thought of as the computer system of a mobile device integrated with a television set unit. A smart TV runs a complete operating system or mobile operating system that may provide a platform for application developers. Thus, a smart TV often allows the user to install and run more advanced applications or plugins/addons based on its specific platform.

A smart TV platform has a public software development kit (SDK) or native development kit (NDK) with which third-party developers can develop applications for it, and an app store so end-users can install and uninstall apps. The public SDK enables third-party application developers to write applications once and see them run successfully on any device that supports the smart TV platform architecture it was written for, regardless of the hardware manufacturer.

Smart TVs deliver content (such as photos, movies and music) from other computers or network attached storage devices on a network using either a Digital Living Network Alliance (DLNA) / Universal Plug and Play (UPnP) media server or similar service program like Windows Media Player or Network-attached storage (NAS), or via iTunes. It also provides access to Internet-based services including traditional broadcast TV channels, catch-up services such as streaming television and video on demand (VOD), electronic program guide, interactive advertising, personalisation, voting, games, social networking, and other multimedia applications. Smart TV enables access to movies, shows, video games, apps and more. Some of those apps include Netflix, Hulu, Spotify, YouTube, and Amazon.

== History ==
In the early 1980s, "intelligent" television receivers were introduced in Japan. The addition of an LSI chip with memory and a character generator to a television receiver enabled Japanese viewers to receive a mix of programming and information transmitted over spare lines of the broadcast television signal. A patent was filed in 1994 (and extended the following year) for an "intelligent" television system, linked with data processing systems, by means of a digital or analog network. Apart from being linked to data networks, one key point is its ability to automatically download necessary software routines, according to a user's demand, and process their needs.

However, descriptions of the elements of a smart television can be found in public discourse from the beginning of the 1980s, if not earlier, with the introduction of videotex services, particularly teletext information for reception by television sets, leading commentators to consider that televisions and accessories would evolve to encompass a range of related activities. In the words of one commentator: "In the long run, this machine is likely to develop into a multi-purpose receiver, for electronic mail, dealing with the bank, calculations, remote information – and 'Not the nine o'clock news' or 'Casablanca' on video."

In the early 2000s, "Bush Internet TV" television sets and set-top boxes had internet-focused marketing and allowed users to access a web portal made by Virgin Media. This range was a commercial failure.

The mass acceptance of digital television in the mid-late 2000s and early 2010s greatly improved smart TVs. Major TV manufacturers have announced production of smart TVs only for their middle-end to high-end TVs in 2015. Smart TVs became the dominant form of television during the late 2010s. At the beginning of 2016, Nielsen reported that 29 percent of those with incomes over $75,000 a year had a smart TV.

== Typical features ==
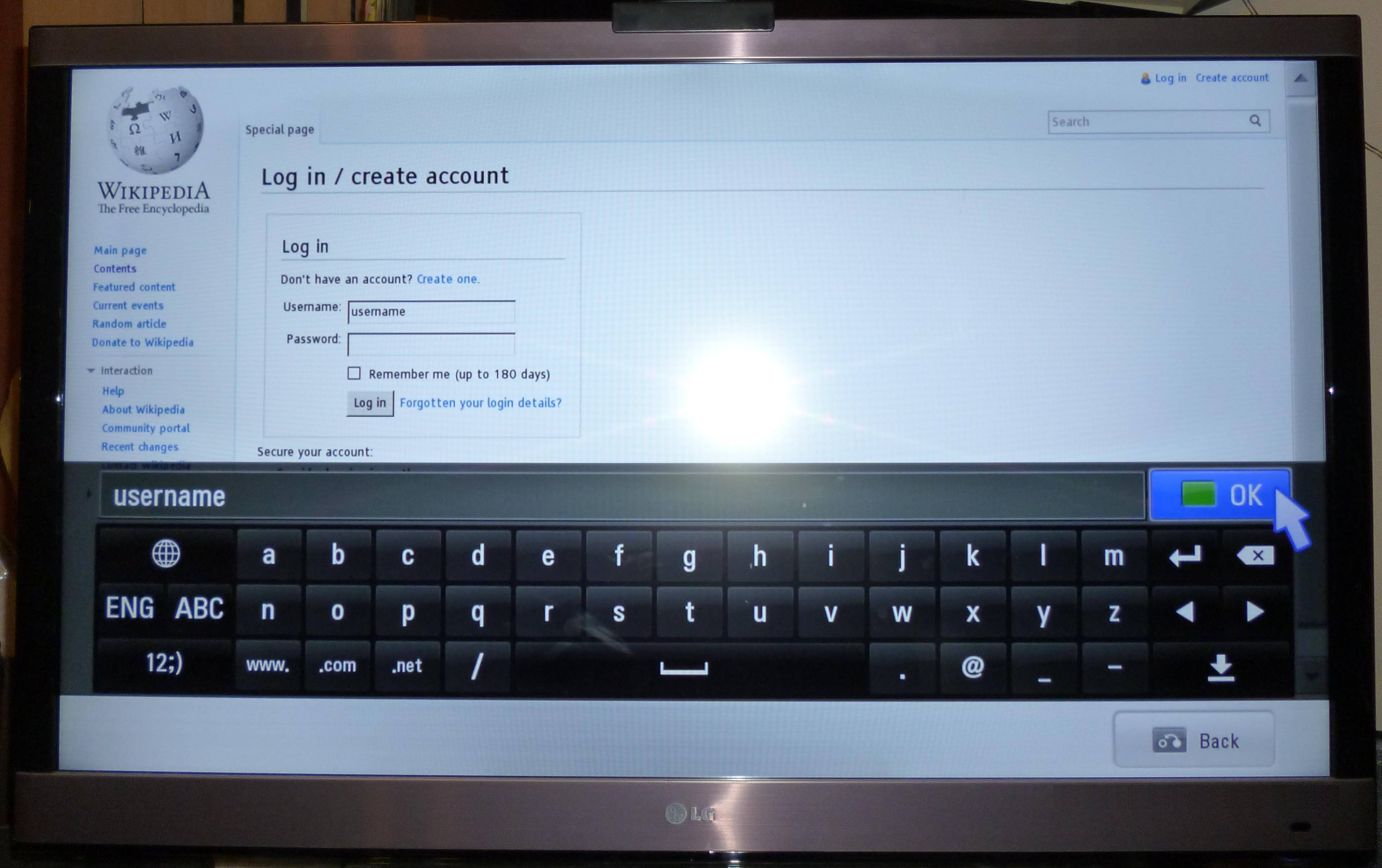
LG smart TV using the Web browser

Smart TV devices also provide access to user-generated content (either stored on an external hard drive or in cloud storage) and to interactive services and Internet applications, such as YouTube, many using HTTP Live Streaming (also known as HLS) adaptive streaming. Smart TV devices facilitate the curation of traditional content by combining information from the Internet with content from TV providers. Services offer users a means to track and receive reminders about shows or sporting events, as well as the ability to change channels for immediate viewing. Some devices feature additional interactive organic user interface/natural user interface technologies for navigation controls and other human interaction with a smart TV, with such as second screen companion devices, spatial gestures input like with Xbox Kinect, and even for speech recognition for natural language user interface. Smart TV develops new features to satisfy consumers and companies, such as new payment processes. LG and PaymentWall have collaborated to allow consumers to access purchased apps, movies, games, and more using a remote control, laptop, tablet, or smartphone. This is intended for an easier and more convenient way for checkout.

== Platforms ==
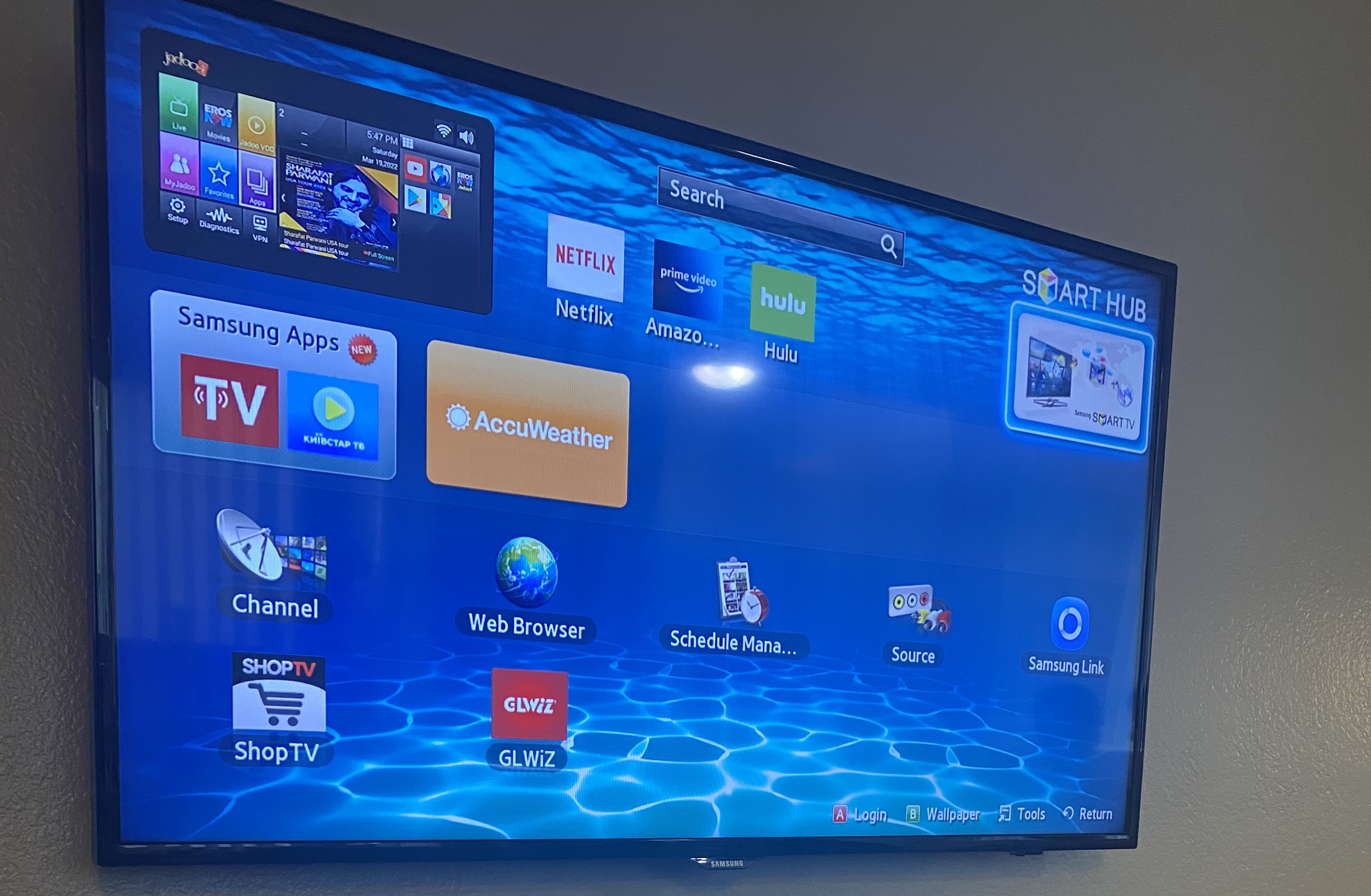
Samsung's discontinued Orsay platform

Smart TV technology and software are still evolving, with both proprietary and open source software frameworks already available. These can run applications (sometimes available via an 'app store' digital distribution platform), play over-the-top media services and interactive on-demand media, personalized communications, and have social networking features.

Android TV, Boxee, Google TV, Horizon TV, Inview, Kodi Entertainment Center, Mediaroom, MeeGo, OpenTV, Plex, RDK (Reference Development Kit), Roku, Smart TV Alliance, ToFu Media Platform, Ubuntu TV, Vewd, and Yahoo! Smart TV are framework platforms managed by individual companies. HbbTV, provided by the Hybrid Broadcast Broadband TV association, CE-HTML, part of Web4CE, OIPF, part of HbbTV, and Tru2way are framework platforms managed by technology businesses. Current smart TV platforms used by vendors are Amazon, Apple, Google, Haier, Hisense, Hitachi, Insignia, LG, Microsoft, Netgear, Panasonic, Philips, Samsung, Sharp, Sony, TCL, TiVO, Toshiba, Sling Media, and Western Digital. Sony, Panasonic, Samsung, LG, and Roku TV are some platforms ranked under the best smart TV platforms.

== Sales ==
According to a report from research group NPD In-Stat, in 2012 only about 12 million U.S. households had their Web-capable TVs connected to the Internet, although an estimated 25 million households owned a set with the built-in network capability. In-Stat predicted that by 2016, 100 million homes in North America and western Europe would be using television sets blending traditional programming with internet content. By the end of 2019, the number of installed Connect TVs reached 1.26 billion worldwide.

The number of households using over-the-top television services has rapidly increased over the years. In 2015, 52% of U.S. households subscribed to Netflix, Amazon Prime, or Hulu Plus; 43% of pay-TV subscribers also used Netflix, and 43% of adults used some streaming video on demand service at least monthly. Additionally, 19% of Netflix subscribers shared their subscription with people outside of their households. Ten percent of adults at the time showed interest in HBO Now.

== Use and issues ==
=== Social networking ===
Some smart TV platforms come prepackaged or can be optionally extended, with social networking technology capabilities. The addition of social networking synchronization to smart TV and HTPC platforms may provide an interaction both with on-screen content and with other viewers than is currently available to most televisions, while simultaneously providing a much more cinematic experience of the content than is currently available with most computers.

=== Advertising ===
Some smart TV platforms also support interactive advertising (companion ads), addressable advertising with local advertising insertion and targeted advertising, and other advanced advertising features such as ad telescoping using VOD and DVR, enhanced TV for consumer call-to-action, and audience measurement solutions for ad campaign effectiveness. The marketing and trading possibilities offered by smart TVs are sometimes summarized by the term t-commerce. Taken together, this bidirectional data flow means smart TVs can be and are used for clandestine observation of the owners. Even in sets that are not configured off-the-shelf to do so, default security measures are often weak and will allow hackers to easily break into the TV.

A 2019 research named "Watching You Watch: The Tracking Ecosystem of Over-the-Top TV Streaming Devices", conducted at Princeton University and University of Chicago, demonstrated that a majority of streaming devices will covertly collect and transmit personal user data, including captured screen images, to a wide network of advertising and analytics companies, raising privacy concerns.

Digital marketing research firm eMarketer reported a 38 percent surge – to close to $7 billion, a 10 percent television advertising market share – in advertising on connected TV like Hulu and Roku, to be underway in 2019, with market indicators that the figure would surpass $10 billion in 2021.

Like traditional linear TV, connected TV is a go-to channel for brand marketers seeking do build awareness. However, recent innovations in ad formats, interactive elements like QR codes, and cross-device technology have made CTV more effective as a performance marketing solution. For example, mobile user acquisition campaigns can incorporate CTV as part of the user journey. Crucially, these innovations are measurable, giving opportunities for more sophisticated optimization.

=== Security ===
There is evidence that a smart TV is vulnerable to attacks. Some serious security bugs have been discovered, and some successful attempts to run malicious code to get unauthorized access were documented on video. There is evidence that it is possible to gain root access to the device, install malicious software, access and modify configuration information for a remote control, remotely access and modify files on TV and attached USB drives, access camera and microphone.

There have also been concerns that hackers may be able to remotely turn on the microphone or webcam on a smart TV, being able to eavesdrop on private conversations. A common loop antenna may be set for a bidirectional transmission channel, capable of uploading data rather than only receiving. Since 2012, security researchers discovered a similar vulnerability present in more series of smart TVs, which allows hackers to get an external root access on the device.

Anticipating growing demand for an antivirus for a smart TV, some security software companies are already working with partners in the digital TV field on the solution. It seems like there is only one antivirus for smart TVs available: "Neptune", a cloud-based antimalware system developed by Ocean Blue Software in partnership with Sophos. However, antivirus company Avira has joined forces with digital TV testing company Labwise to work on software to protect against potential attacks. The privacy policy for Samsung's smart TVs has been called Orwellian (a reference to George Orwell and the dystopian world of constant surveillance he depicted in Nineteen Eighty-Four), and compared to Telescreens because of eavesdropping concerns. LG has also implemented a security system, "LG Shield", designed to protect smart TV platforms through features such as application integrity checks and system-level safeguards against unauthorized access.

Hackers have misused smart TV's abilities such as operating source codes for applications and its unsecured connection to the Internet. Passwords, IP address data, and credit card information can be accessed by hackers and even companies for advertisement. A company caught in the act is Vizio. The confidential documents, codenamed Vault 7 and dated from 2013 to 2016, include details on CIA's software capabilities, such as the ability to compromise smart TVs.

=== Restriction of access ===
Internet websites can block smart TV access to content at will or tailor the content that will be received by each platform. Google TV-enabled devices were blocked by NBC, ABC, CBS, and Hulu from accessing their Web content since the launch of Google TV in October 2010. Google TV devices were also blocked from accessing any programs offered by Viacom's subsidiaries.

=== Reliability ===
In 2017, high-end Samsung smart TVs stopped working for at least seven days after a software update. Application providers are rarely upgrading smart TV apps to the latest version; for example, Netflix does not support older TV versions with new Netflix upgrades.

== See also ==
- 10-foot user interface
- Automatic content recognition
- Digital Living Network Alliance (DLNA)
- Digital media player
- Home automation
- Home theater PC
- Hotel television systems
- Hybrid Broadcast Broadband TV
- Interactive television
- Internet of things
- List of mobile app distribution platforms
- List of smart TV platforms
- Over-the-top media service (OTT)
- PC-on-a-stick
- Second screen
- Smartphone
- Space shifting
- Smart speaker
- Television set
- Telescreen
- Tivoization
- TV Genius
- Video on demand
