= SV-328 =

8-bit home computer introduced by Spectravideo in 1983

Spectravideo SV-328
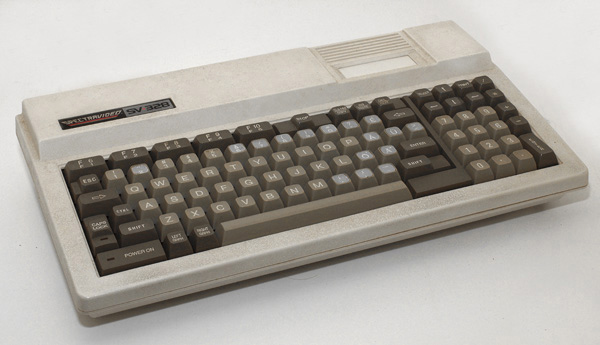
- Developer: Spectravideo
- Product family: Spectravideo
- Type: Home computer
- Released: 1983 (Summer CES, Chicago)
- Operating system: Microsoft Extended BASIC; CP/M
- CPU: Zilog Z80A @ 3.579545 MHz
- Memory: 64 KB
- Removable storage: ROM Cartridge, Cassette tape, floppy disc
- Display: 256 × 192, 15 colours; TV or composite monitor
- Graphics: TMS9918 (16 KB VRAM)
- Sound: AY-3-8910
- Input: Keyboard
- Successor: SV-728
- Related: SV-318

The SV-328 is an 8-bit home computer introduced by Spectravideo in June 1983. It was the business-targeted model of the Spectravideo range, sporting a compact full-travel keyboard with numeric keypad. It is considered the predecessor of the MSX computers. It had 64 KB RAM (64 KB available for software and 16 KB video memory), a respectable amount for its time. Other than the keyboard and RAM, this machine was identical to its little brother, the SV-318.

The SV-328 is the design on which the MSX standard was based. Spectravideo's MSX-compliant successor to the 328, the SV-728, looks almost identical, the only immediately noticeable differences being a larger cartridge slot in the central position (to fit MSX standard cartridges), lighter shaded keyboard and the MSX badging.

Reference to the operating system Microsoft Extended BASIC is not to be confused with MSX BASIC, although some marketing at the time claimed that Microsoft Extended is what MSX stood for. More than 130 games were released for the system.

== System specs ==
- Processor: Zilog Z80A running at 3.6 MHz
- ROM: 32 KB
  - BIOS (16 KB)
  - BASIC (16 KB)
- RAM: 64 KB
- Video Display Processor: TMS9918
  - VRAM: 16 KB
  - Text mode: 40×24
  - Graphic mode: 256×192 (32x24) with 15 colours
  - Sprites: 32, 1 colour, max 4 per horizontal line
- Sound chip: General Instrument AY-3-8910 (PSG)
- I/O chip: Intel 8255

== Peripherals ==
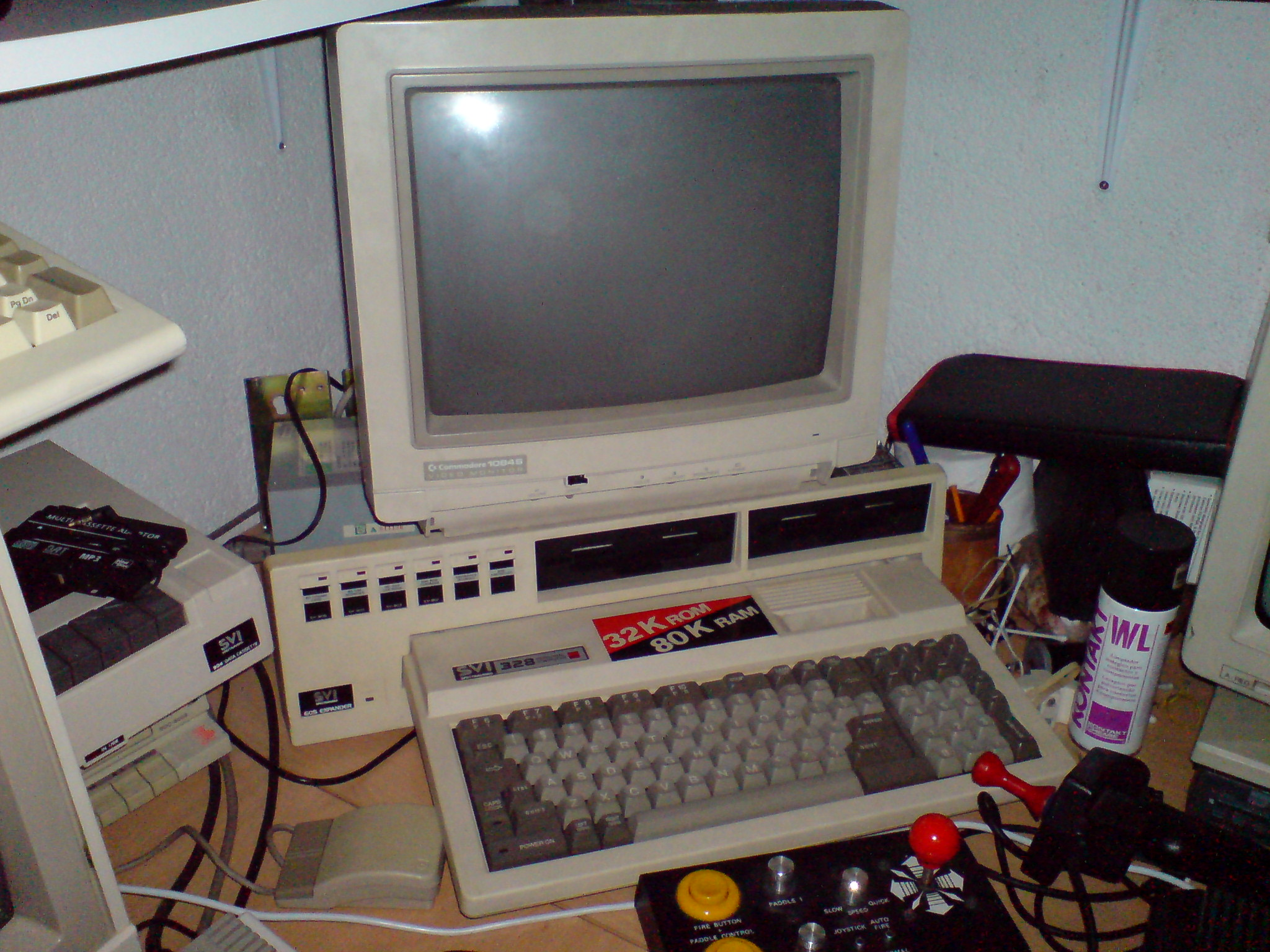
SV-328 connected to a tape drive (left) and a SV-601B Super Expander.

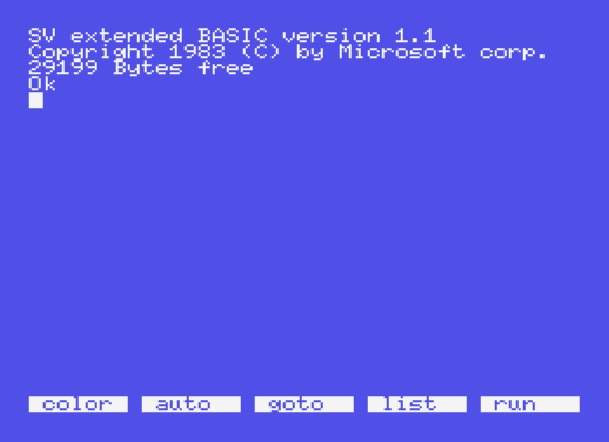
SV-328 screen immediately after booting.

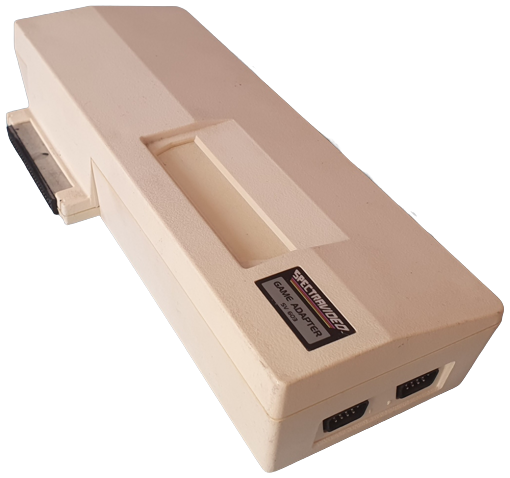
Spectravideo SVI-603 game adapter

The standard ports of a SV-318 / SV-328 support only a few peripherals such as the SV-903 tape drive, a CVBS monitor (or external RF modulator for TV), and two joysticks. However the Super Expander edge connector offered more options:

- SV-803 Memory expansion card, 16 KB
- SV-807 Memory expansion card, 64 KB
- SV-805 RS-232 card
- SV-701 Internal modem, 300 baud
- SV-802 Centronics parallel port card for printer
- SV-806 80-column video card
- SV-801 Floppy controller card, needed for disk drive usage
- Hard disk controller card
- SV-809 Network card
- SV-602 Mini Expander (for one card)
- SV-601A Expander case with power supply and many slots. External disk drives
- SV-601B Super Expander, similar but with built-in floppy drive and an optional second drive
- SV-603 ColecoVision adapter, enabling ColecoVision games to be played on the SV-328
- SV-901C 80-columns printer at 50 cps (a refurbished Seikosha SK-100)
- SV-902 External floppy drive
- SV-903 cassette drive
- SV-904 cassette drive
- SV-105 Graphics Tablet
