= Mangia =

1983 video game

- Publisher: Spectravision
- Platform: Atari 2600
- Release: NA: March 1983; PAL: 1984
- Genre: Action
- Mode: Single-player

Mangia (also styled Mangia', with a trailing apostrophe) is a video game for the Atari 2600 released by Spectravision in 1983. It was mainly released in Europe but also saw a small release in North America. The title "Mangia" is an Italian word meaning "eat!". The North American version is one of the rarest games for the 2600.

== Gameplay ==
Screenshot

The player controls a young boy who must eat plates of pasta placed in front of him by his mother, who will keep feeding him until his stomach explodes on-screen. To prevent this, the player can throw it to a cat, who occasionally appears at the window, and a dog, who walks across the bottom of the screen. However, if the mother sees the pasta being thrown to the cat or dog, she brings three times as much pasta the next time she returns.

The joystick is used to control the player: pressing right causes the boy to grab a plate of pasta, pressing left causes him to eat it, and pressing up or down causes him to toss the pasta to the cat (named Frankie in the manual) or the dog (named Sergio) respectively. If the cat and dog are not nearby when the food is thrown to them, the mother returns with extra pasta to "punish" the player. The fire button is not used.

If the player is idle, instead of eating the pasta or throwing it to the animals the pasta will accumulate on the table until it breaks, causing the player to lose a turn. Attempting to eat all the pasta without giving any to the cat or dog will cause the boy's stomach to swell, changing colors from blue to yellow to red, before finally exploding in a mass of chunky blue pixels.

== Reception ==
French magazine Tilt thought it required both a keen eye and tactical skill. They gave it five stars for interest, four stars for graphics, but only two stars for sound. German magazine TeleMatch thought the idea was novel but the execution was lacking, criticizing the animations lack of fluidity and blocky outlines. Italian magazine Videogiochi was not pleased that a video game all about Italy was full of cliches such as pizza, spaghetti, and mandolins. American journalist Brett Weiss in 2007 said it was a "repetitious" game with a "bizzare politically incorrect premise". He thought it was valuable only for its novelty.
