= SVI-838 =

Microcomputer produced by Spectravideo

- Also known as: X'press 16
- Manufacturer: Spectravideo
- Type: personal computer
- Released: 1986
- Operating system: MS-DOS 2.11 / CP/M-86
- CPU: Intel 8088 @ 4.77 MHz
- Memory: 256 KB (+128 KB VRAM)—640 KB (max.)
- Removable storage: Cartridge, disk drive
- Graphics: CGA, Yamaha V9938
- Sound: AY-3-8910

The SVI-838, also known as X'press 16, is the last microcomputer produced by Spectravideo (at Hong Kong). Although it was a PC clone, it had the standard sound and video coprocessors of the MSX2, making it a hybrid system. The sales were unimpressive and it is now considered a collectible.

With a SVI-811 adapter, the machine could run MSX1 programs in cartridge.

== Technical specifications ==
The SVI-838 had the following technical specifications:

- CPU: Intel 8088 @ 4.77 MHz
- RAM: 256 to 640 KB
- VRAM: 128 KB (V9938); 16 KB (CGA)
- ROM: 16 KB (BIOS)
- Keyboard: mechanic, PC standard 83 keys
- Display: CGA and Yamaha V9938 for MSX2 graphics
- Sound: General Instrument AY-3-8910 (PSG)
- Ports: two joystick ports, TV out, video monitor out, parallel port, serial port, sound out (RCA), cartridge slot, SV expansion slot, one ISA slot.
- Storage: single 5 1/4-inch disk drive (360 KB); two disk drives; one disc drive and a 20 MB HD

== Peripherals ==
Main items:

- SVI-109P: Quickshot IX, joyball (IBM compatible)
- SVI-811: MSX1 Game Adapter (an adapter with a Zilog Z80A UCP and MSX standard joystick ports)
- SVI-812: Multifunction card (384 KiB RAM, RS-232C, RTC)
- SVI-813: cooler
- SVI-814P: PAL RF adapter (to color TVs or RGB monitor)
- SVI-815: Monitor cable (D15 to 21-pin adapter, to RGB monitor)
- SVI-816: Monitor cable (D15 to 8-pin adapter, to digital/analog RGB monitor).
