= Chase the Chuck Wagon =

1983 video game

- Developer: TMQ
- Publisher: Spectravision
- Designer: Mike Schwartz
- Platform: Atari 2600
- Release: 1983
- Genre: Maze

Chase the Chuck Wagon is a 1983 promotional video game written by Mike Schwartz for the Atari 2600 and distributed by Purina. It was available only via mail order by sending in proofs of purchase to Purina. In the 1970s and 1980s, popular television commercials for Purina dog food included a dog chasing a tiny chuckwagon. The gameplay is loosely based on this premise.

== Gameplay ==
Attract mode

Chase the Chuck Wagon is a maze video game. The object of each maze screen is to move Chuckie, the dog, through mazes of four different designs and escape through the opening directly below the chuckwagon. The player has limited time (60 or 30 seconds depending on the difficulty setting) per maze to accomplish this.

There are two obstacles in each maze: the dog catcher moves through the maze, and, if he touches Chuckie, the player loses one life; the bouncing object (bone, etc.) travels back and forth across the maze unhindered by the maze walls, and, if it touches Chuckie, he will be frozen momentarily (signified by the maze changing color), making it more difficult to reach the end of maze within the time limit or avoid the dog catcher.

After successfully completing a maze, a reward screen appears. A dog dish drops from the chuckwagon, and the player must use the joystick to orient Chuckie left or right to face the dish, and press the fire button at the right moment to stop it horizontal to Chuckie, allowing him to move to the dish and eat. This gives an additional 100 points. If the player misses, no points are awarded and the game advances to the next maze screen. If the player does not press the fire button, the dish falls repeatedly and the game does not advance.

Chuckie avoids a dog catcher. A flickering bone isn't visible.

The player starts the game with three Chuckies. Chuckies are lost when time runs out on a maze or upon contact with the dog catcher. The game ends when all the Chuckies are exhausted.

=== Scoring ===
The amount of time left at the end of each maze is the player's score for that stage. Each successfully completed reward screen adds 100 points. The total score is displayed at the end of the game.

=== Controls ===
The player uses the joystick to move Chuckie through mazes and to change his facing on the reward screen. The fire button is only used to stop the dropping food dish on the rewards screens.

Reset does not start the game (which is the typical behavior). Select is used instead.

== History ==
As part of a promotion involving the Chuck Wagon line of dog food, Purina contracted video game distributor Spectravision to create a game themed around dogs and dog food. Customers could redeem proofs of purchase from bags of dog food in exchange for the game, an example of a new marketing technique that emerged during the popularity of video games in the early 1980s. In practice, the promotion was relatively unsuccessful. The unshipped cartridges were destroyed.

I was approached by a good friend who ran TMQ/ICOM and he badly needed this game programmed over a weekend. Yes, it took me all of 3 days to cobble this game together. I had existing code from my first game, Artillery Duel, to look at. The sound effects were basically the same. I apologize for the weak gameplay, but I was rushed!

— Mike Schwartz

== Legacy ==
Chase the Chuck Wagon is far from the rarest of games for the Atari 2600, but it is often referred to as the Holy Grail of Atari 2600 video game collecting.

== See also ==
- Kool-Aid Man
