= SVI-738 =

Spectravideo SVI-738 X'Press
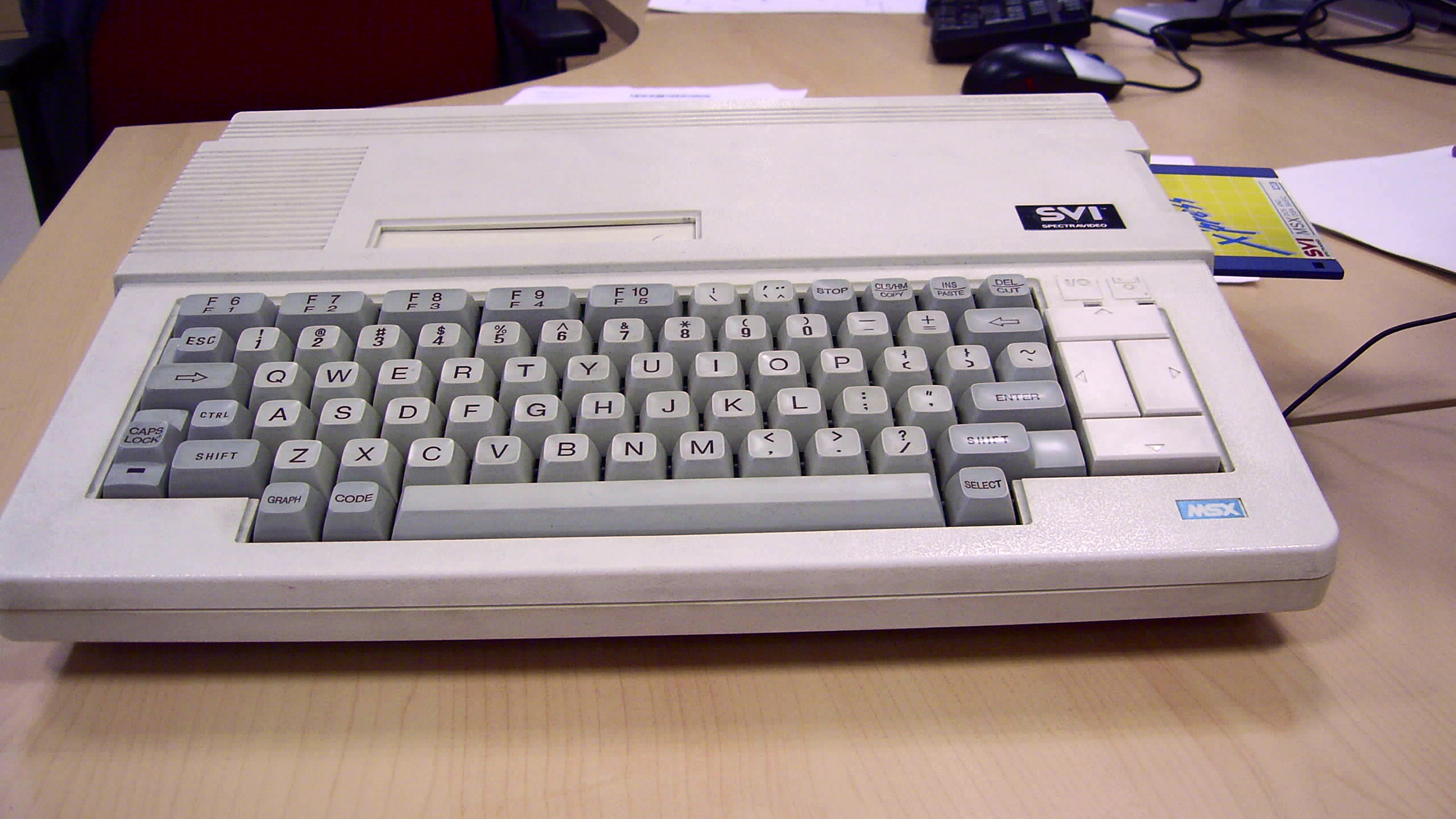
- Developer: Spectravideo
- Type: Home computer
- Released: 1985
- Introductory price: £399.99 (UK); 440000PLZ (Poland)
- Media: 3 1/2-inch floppy disks, ROM cartridge, cassette tapes
- Operating system: MSX BASIC; MSX-DOS; CP/M 2.2
- CPU: Zilog Z80A @ 3.58 MHz
- Memory: 64 KB (+16 KB video memory)
- Display: 256x192 pixel resolution, 256 colours
- Graphics: Yamaha V9938
- Sound: AY-3-8910
- Input: Keyboard
- Related: SVI-728

The Spectravideo SVI-738 X'Press is an MSX1 compatible home computer manufactured by Spectravideo from 1985. Although compatible with the MSX 1.0 standard, it incorporates several extensions to the standard (80-column display, serial RS-232, built-in 3.5" floppy drive); many are hardware-compatible with the MSX 2.0 standard but the system as a whole is not, leading to it being referred to as an "MSX 1.5" computer.

Along with the Sony HB-101, Canon V-8, Casio MX-10 and Hitachi MB-H1, it was a portable computer based on the MSX standard, hence the title "X'Press". It came packaged with its own carrying bag in addition to the manuals, booklets and software (CP/M 2.2 and MSX-DOS 1.0) a disk containing a special demonstration program featuring an astronaut flying about on the screen, demonstrating the computer's graphic capabilities and listing facts about the computer's ROM and RAM sizes.

Along with the disk drive and integrated serial port, what stood out the most was the use of the graphics chip specified by the MSX-2 standard, although the use of only 16 KB of VRAM allowed you to add only an 80 column mode. This, together with bugs in the first model's design (Konami SCC-sound based cartridges do not work or have bad sound) are among the reasons for the "MSX 1.5" moniker.

It ran Microsoft Disk BASIC 1.0 from ROM when turned on if no disk or a non-autoexecutable disk was inserted.

== Marketing ==
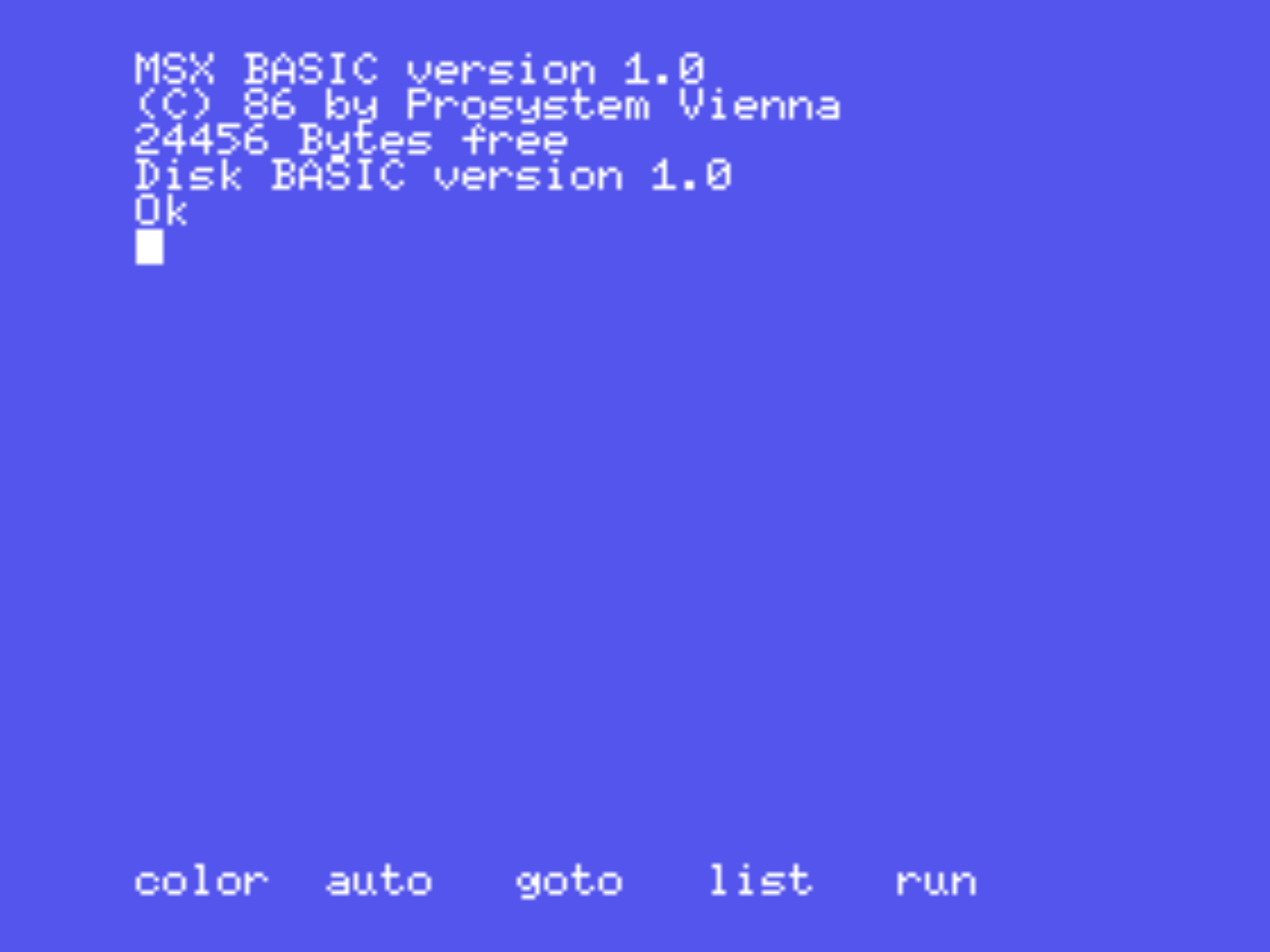
Startup screen of modified Polish variant. Prosystem Vienna (a company that modified ROM) replaced original Microsoft in copyright statement.

The computer was marketed mainly in Europe, Australasia and the Middle East. In Poland, 2000 units were marketed in 1986 by Centralna Składnica Harcerska at a price of 440 000 PLZ (the average salary for 18 months at that time). This was the only MSX computer to be sold in official network in communist Poland. This version of the SVI-738 was equipped with an altered keyboard and ROM in order to provide Polish-specific characters. It could also be found in schools in Finland. In Spain, it was initially distributed by Indescomp until the creation of a Spanish subsidiary. In the United Kingdom, it was sold for £399.95. The SVI-738 was also sold in the United States.

== Technical specifications ==
Microprocessor

- Zilog Z80A with a clockspeed of 3.58 MHz

Memory

- ROM: 56 KB
- RAM: 64 KB
- VRAM: 16 KB

Video

- Graphical processor: Yamaha V9938 (NTSC/PAL)

- Graphical resolution: 256 x 192 pixels
- text modes: 80 characters x 24 and 40 characters x 24 lines and 32 characters x 24 lines
- colors: 16
- sprites: 32
Sound

- General Instrument AY-3-8910-soundchip

- 3 sound channels
- 1 noise channels
- 1 envelope controller
Connectors

- 1 data recorder/cassette deck
- 2 joysticks MSX
- 1 cartridge
- 1 RS-232c DE-9
- 1 DB-25 external disk drive
- 1 Audio/Video set (two RCA connectors)
- 1 UHF modulator TV NTSC (USA) / PAL (Europe)

== Image gallery ==
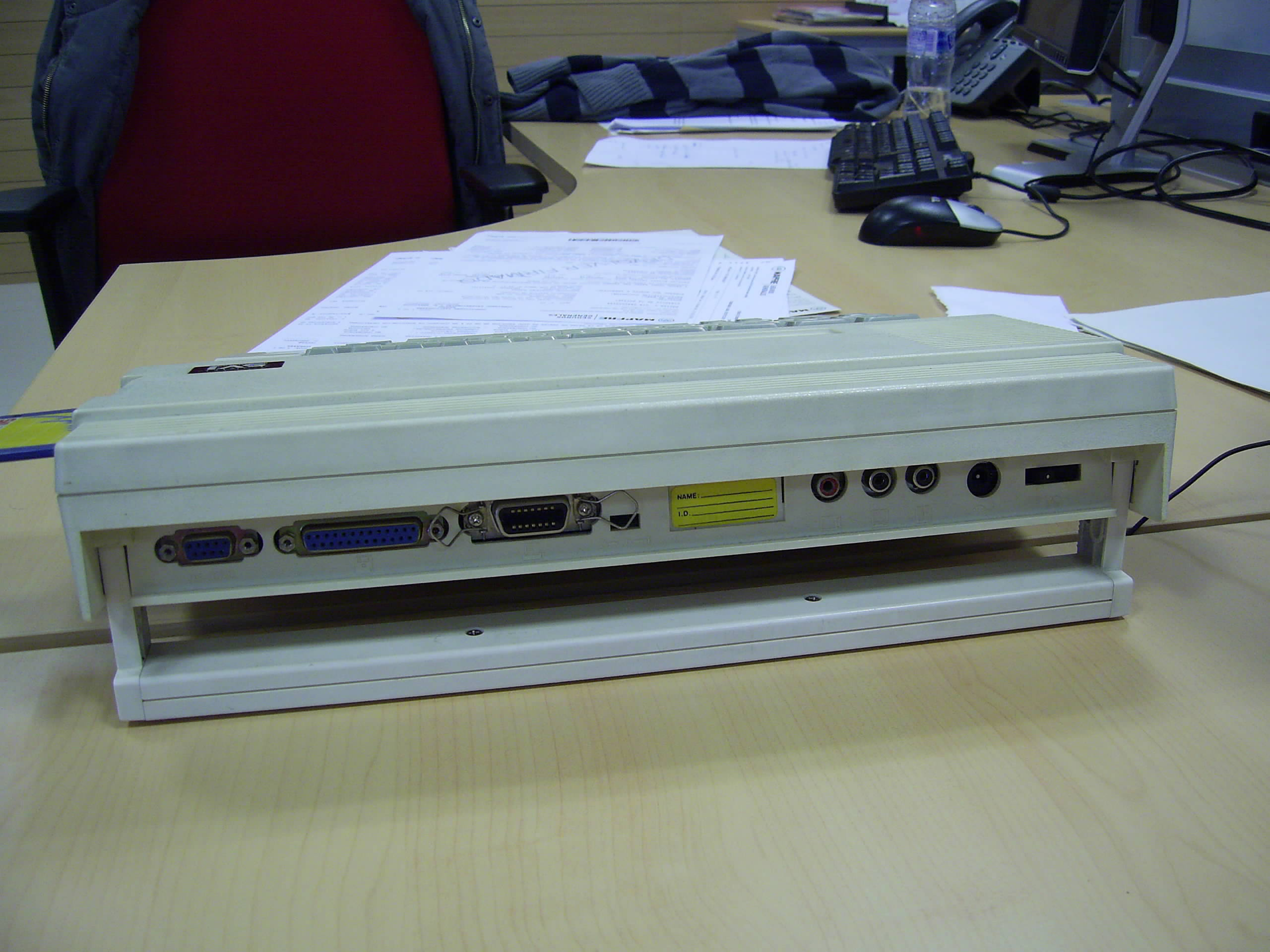

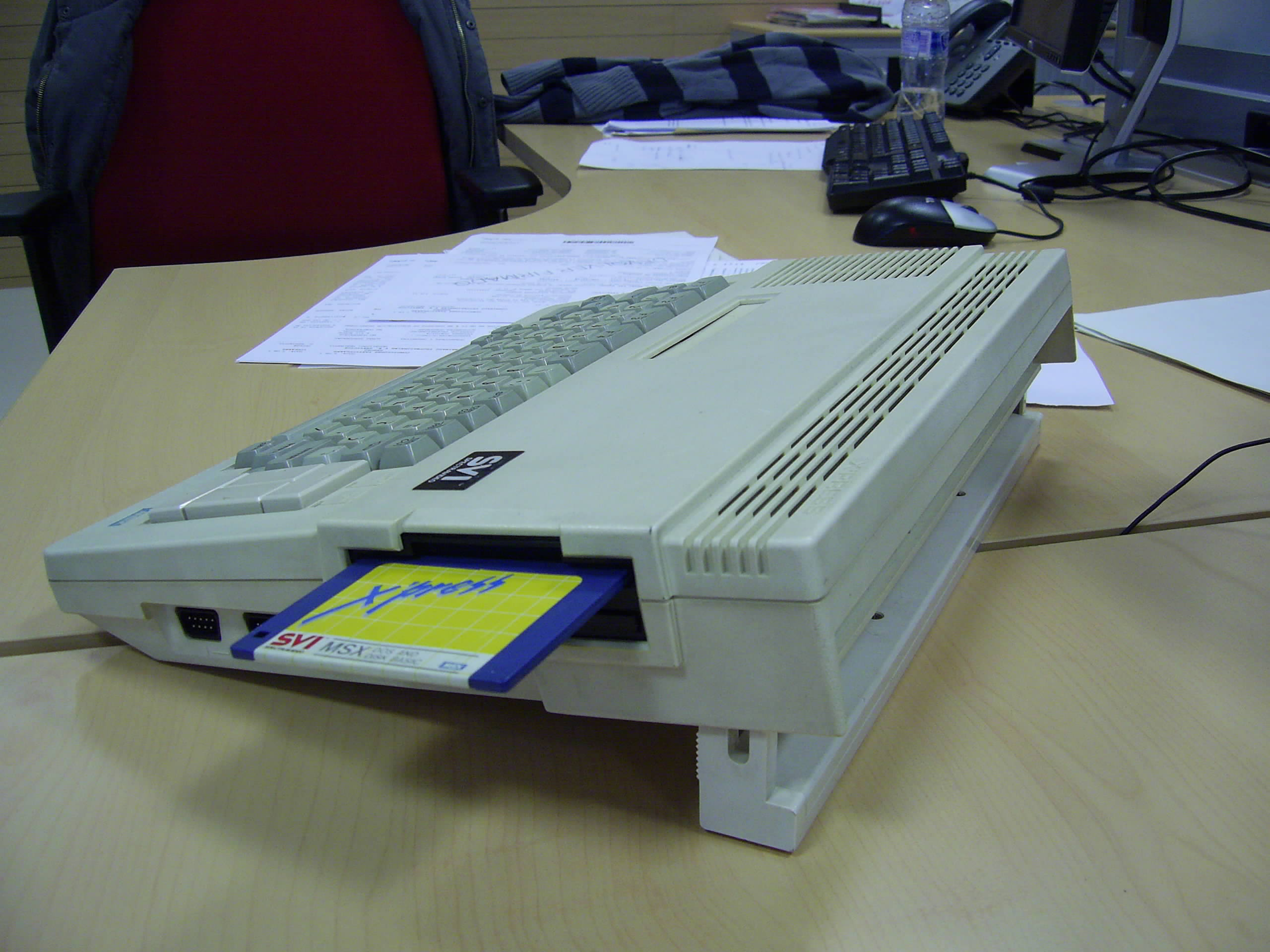

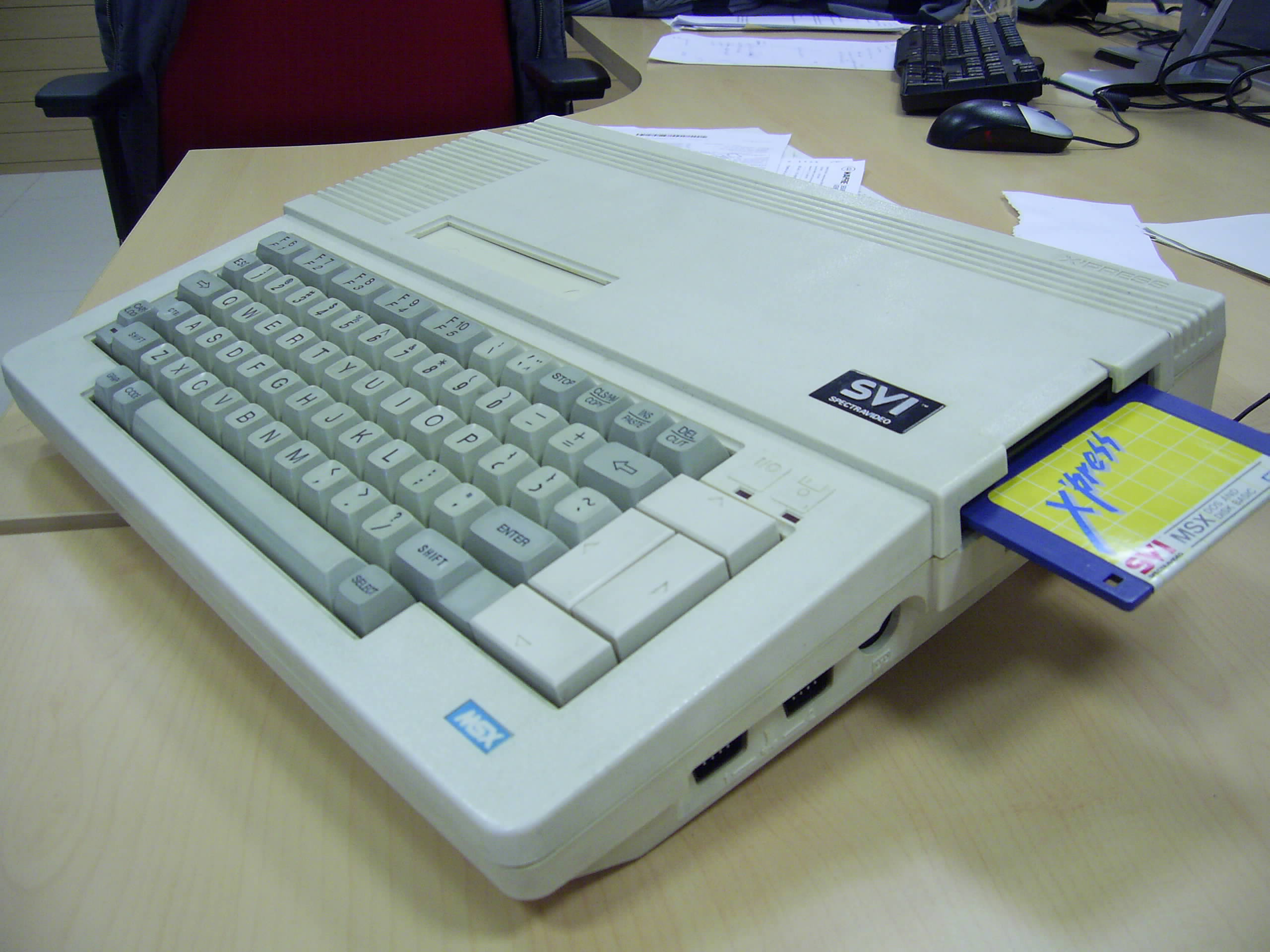

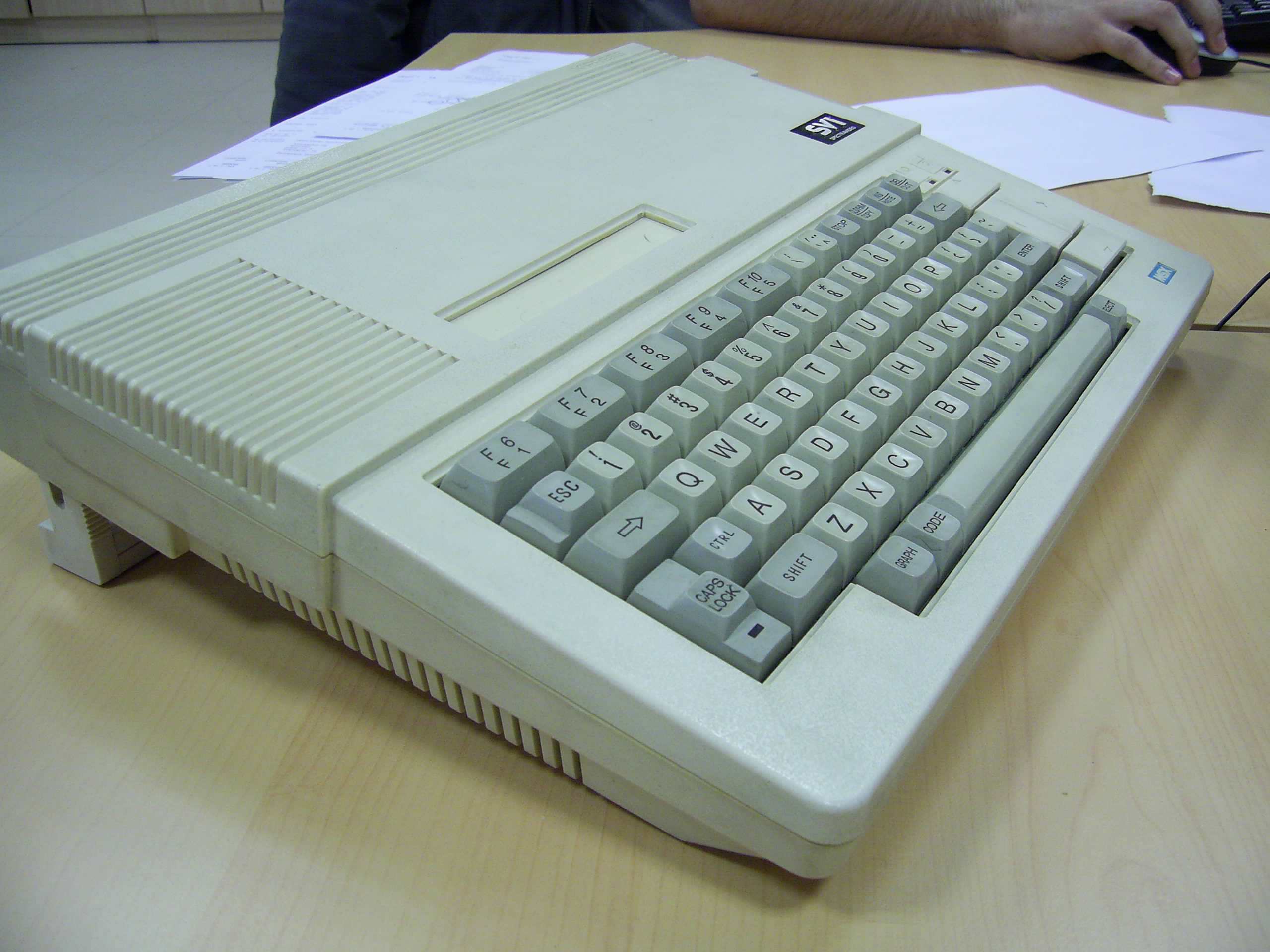

== See also ==
- SVI-728
