= SVI-728 =

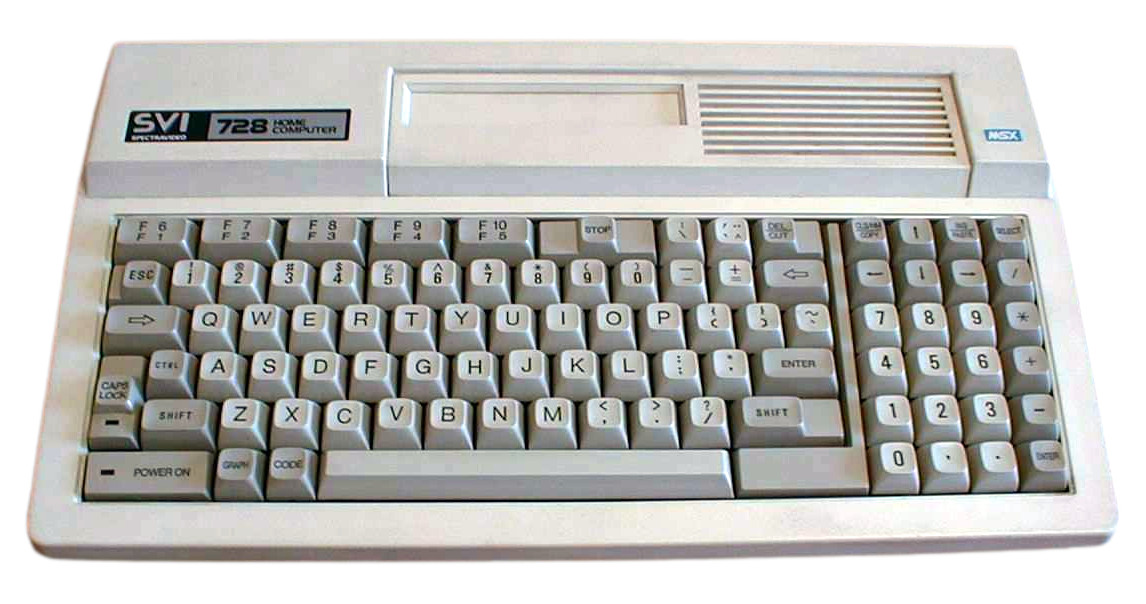
- Product family: MSX
- Type: Home computer
- Released: 1984
- Operating system: MSX BASIC; MSX-DOS; CP/M 2.2
- CPU: Zilog Z80A @ 3.58 MHz
- Memory: 64 KB (+16 KB video memory)
- Removable storage: 3 1/2-inch floppy disks, ROM cartridge, cassette tapes
- Display: 256x192 pixel resolution, 15 colours
- Graphics: TMS9118/TMS9129 (NTSC/PAL)
- Sound: AY-3-8910
- Input: Keyboard
- Predecessor: SV-328
- Related: SVI-738

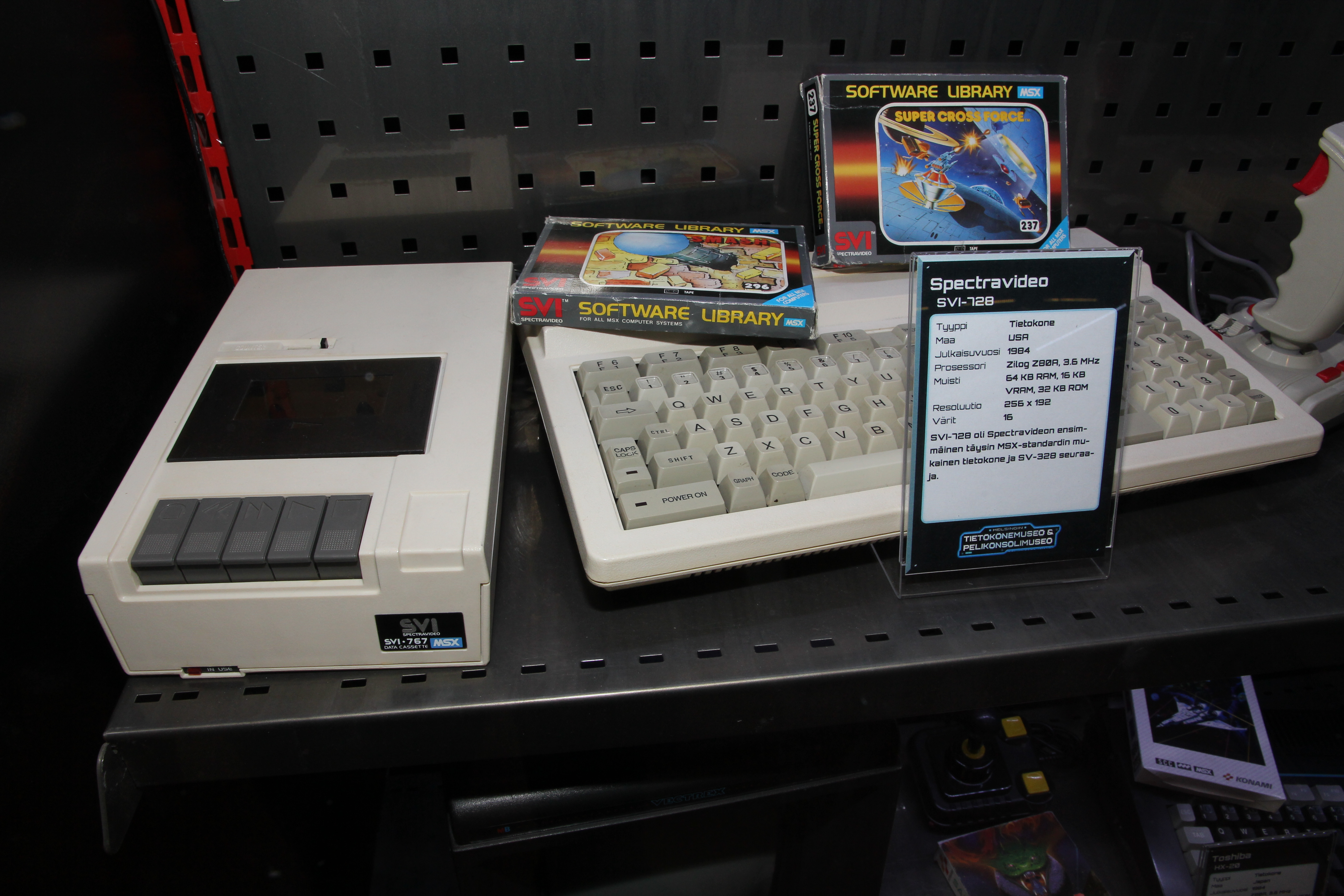
Spectravideo SVI-728 computer with tape drive in Helsinki Computer and game console museum.

The SVI-728 is the first home computer from Spectravideo that complied fully with the MSX home computer specification. It was introduced in 1984. The design is virtually identical to that of the earlier SV-328, which did not comply fully with the MSX standard.

The SVI-738 is a portable version of this computer.

== Technical specifications ==
The SVI-728 had the following technical specifications:

Microprocessor

- Zilog Z80A with a clockspeed of 3.58 MHz.

Memory

- ROM: 32 KB
- RAM: 64 KB (expandable to 256 KB)
- VRAM: 16 KB

Video

- Graphical processor: Texas Instruments TMS9118/TMS9129 (NTSC/PAL)

- Graphical resolution: 256 x 192 (32 x 24) pixels
- text modes: 40 characters x 24 lines
- colors: 15
- sprites: 32
Sound

- General Instrument AY-3-8910-soundchip

- 3 sound channels
- 1 noise channels
- 1 envelope controller
Connectors

- 1 data recorder/Cassette deck
- 2 joysticks
- 1 cartridge
- 1 Super Expander
- 1 disk station
