= CompuMate =

Home computer peripheral

CompuMate SV010
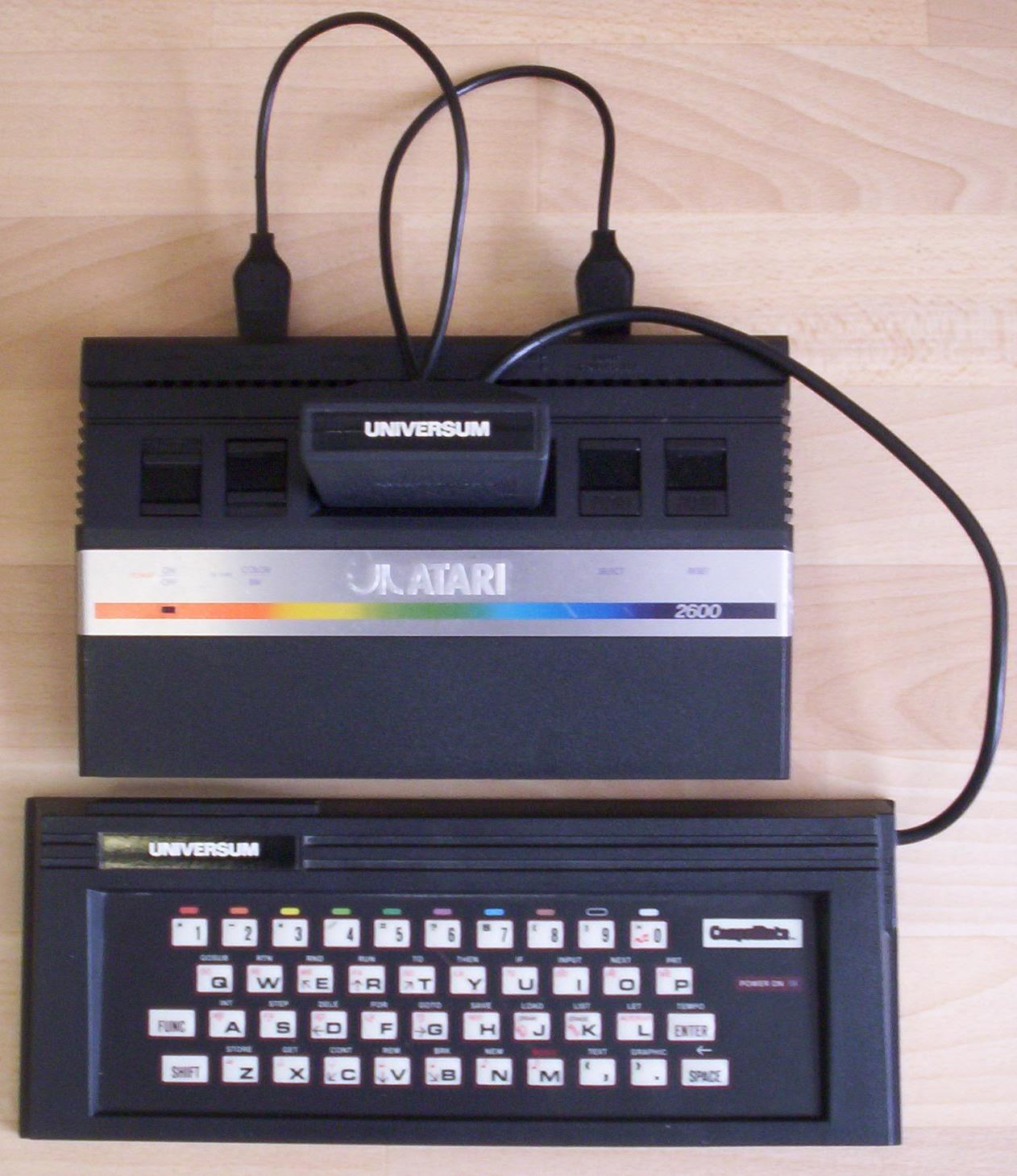
- Atari 2600 Junior with the 'UNIVERSUM Heimcomputer' German clone of the CompuMate
- Also known as: CompuMate
- Manufacturer: Spectravideo
- Released: 6 January 1983; 43 years ago
- Introductory price: 79.99 US$ (today $258.57)
- Operating system: Microsoft BASIC
- CPU: Uses the base machine's MOS 6507 @ 1.19 MHz (Inside Atari VCS/2600/2600jr)
- Memory: 2K built-in RAM, 16K built-in ROM
- Storage: via audio jack on tape
- Display: 10 lines × 12 characters
- Graphics: 40x40 pixels with 10 selectable colors
- Input: 42-key Sensor Touch Keyboard, (2x) 9-pin sub-D connector, game cartridge connector, earphone mini-jack, microphone mini-jack
- Dimensions: 13-1/2"W x 6"D x 1-1/2"H (W 343mm x D 152mm x H 38mm)

The CompuMate SV010 was a home computer peripheral manufactured by Spectravideo International for the Atari 2600 home video game console. It was released on 6 January 1983 at the Winter Consumer Electronics Show in Las Vegas, Nevada.

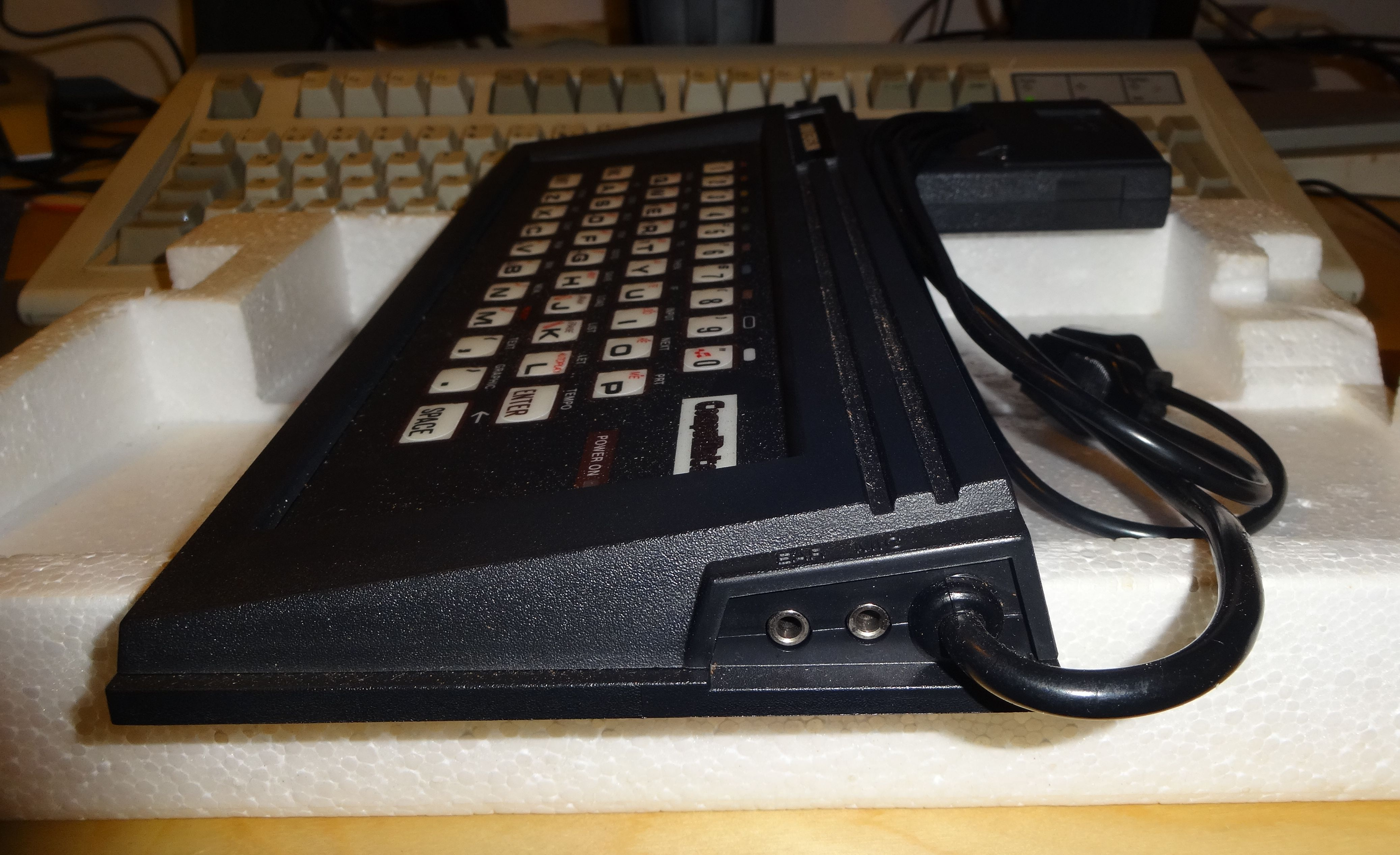
'UNIVERSUM Heimcomputer' alias 'Spectravideo CompuMate SV-010' Face of right side with audio in and audio out for tape player

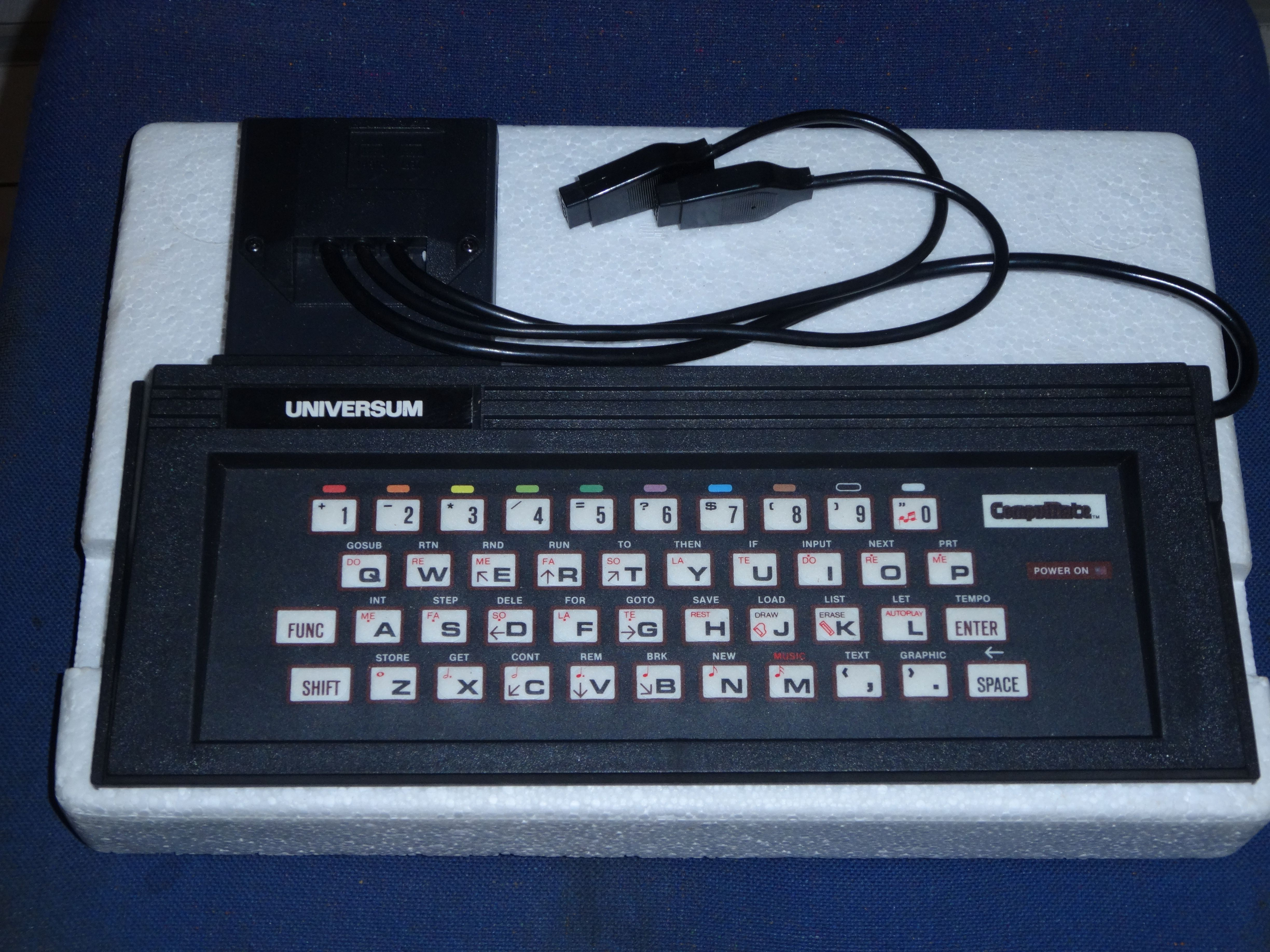
'UNIVERSUM Heimcomputer' alias 'Spectravideo CompuMate SV-010' aerial view

In Germany, the CompuMate was marketed by Quelle, a catalogue company, as the Universum Heimcomputer. In Brazil (circa 1985), at least two clones of CompuMate were made: the Dactar-Comp by Milmar Electronics, and the CompuGame.

== Hardware ==
The ComputeMate consists of a membrane keyboard, output interfaces, and read-only internal storage. It connects to the console's module slot and to both controller ports. The user could optionally place the ComputeMate on top of the console—although not when used with the Atari 2600 Jr. model.

The CompuMate has a 3.5-mm phone connector in order to connect a Compact Cassette unit for non-volatile data storage. Its read-only memory is preinstalled with three computer programs.

PAL and NTSC versions of the CompuMate were manufactured.

== Software ==
The CompuMate has three simple computer programs in its internal read-only memory:

1. Magic Easel, a drawing and animation program with a 40×40-pixel canvas and 10 selectable colors. It can animate up to nine frames in a repeating loop. It has two demonstration pictures: a world map and a snowman.
2. Music Composer, a software synthesizer with four demonstration songs: "Twinkle, Twinkle, Little Star", "Long, Long Ago", "Jingle Bells", and "My Bonnie".
3. BASIC editor and interpreter

Spectravideo only published two programs for the CompuMate on Compact Cassette, PictureMate (1983) and SongMate (1983).

== See also ==
- BASIC Programming cartridge for the Atari 2600
