= Spectravideo =

American computer manufacturer and software house

Spectravideo International Limited
- Industry: Computer hardware Video games
- Founded: United States, 1981
- Defunct: 1988
- Key people: Harry Fox; Alex Weiss
- Products: SV-318; SV-328; SVI-728; SVI-738; SVI-838; Joysticks

Spectravideo International Limited (SVI) (printed as Spectra Video, with the space, in game manuals) was an American computer manufacturer and software house. It was originally called SpectraVision, a company founded by Harry Fox in 1981. The company produced video games and other software for the VIC-20 home computer, the Atari 2600 home video game console, and its CompuMate peripheral. Some of their own computers were compatible with the Microsoft MSX or the IBM PC.

Despite their initial success, the company faced financial troubles, and by 1988, operations ceased. Later, a UK-based company bought the Spectravideo brand name from Bondwell in 1988, but this company, known as Logic3, had no connection to the original Spectravideo products and was dissolved in 2016.

== History ==
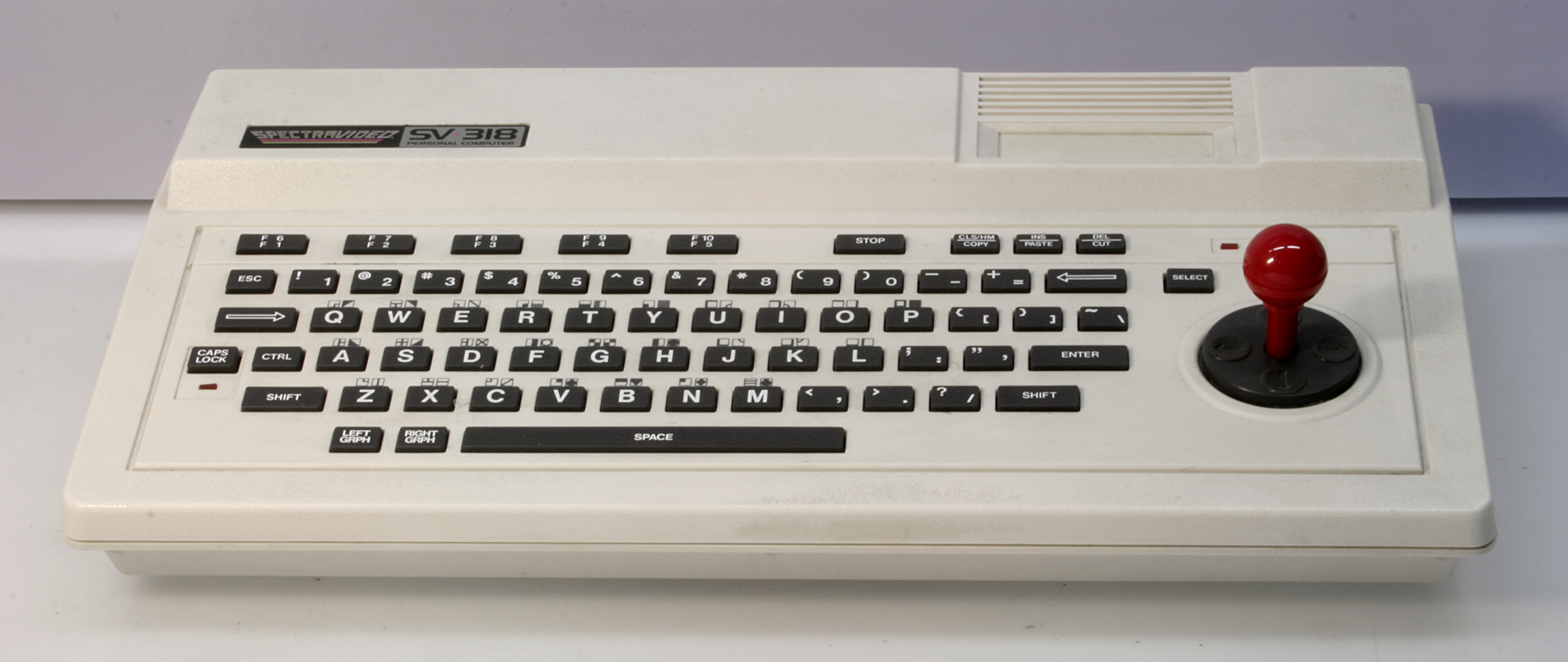
The SV-318 has a built-in joystick.

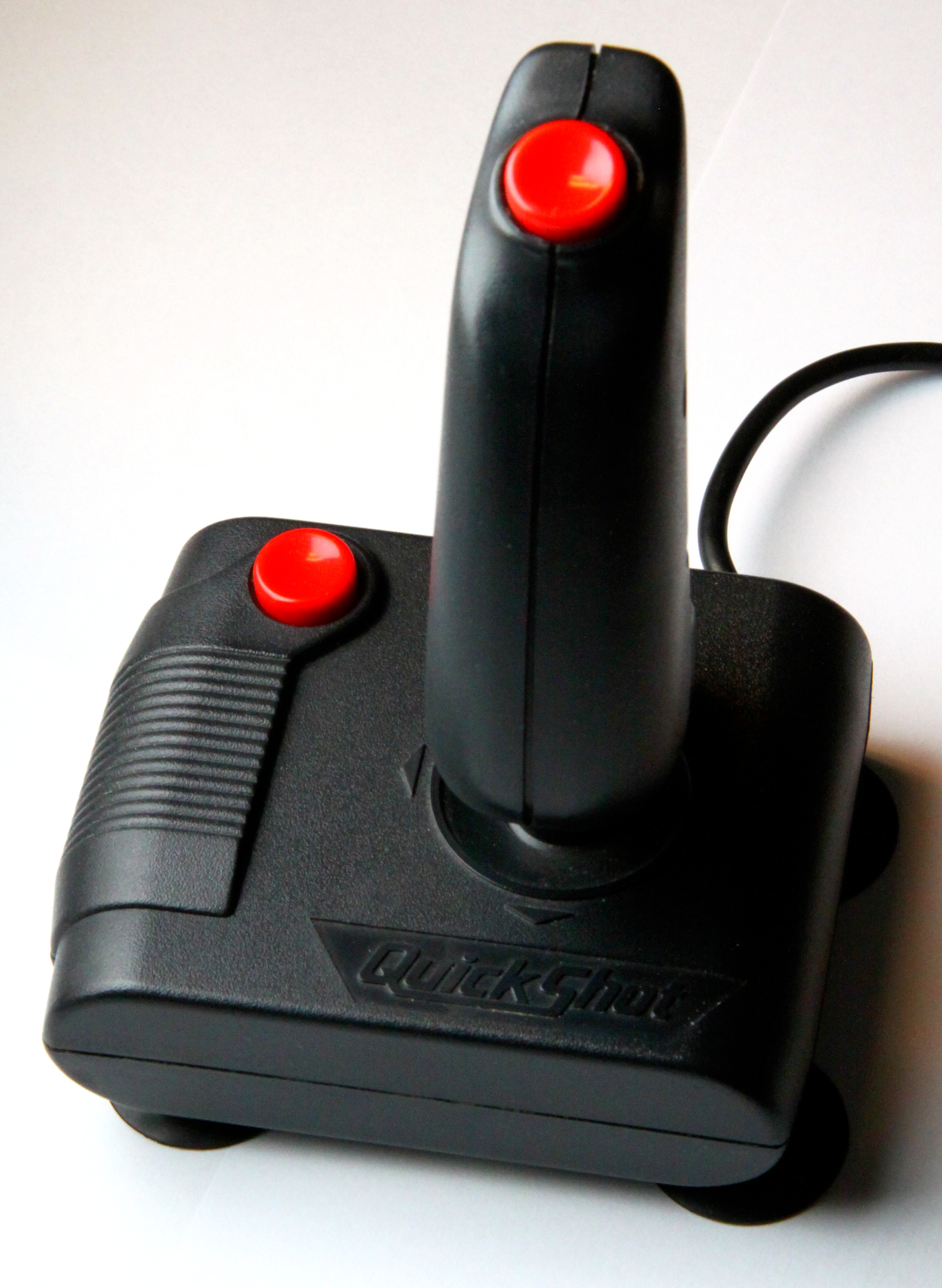
The QuickShot I joystick was introduced in 1982.

SpectraVision was founded in 1981 by Harry Fox and Alex Weiss as a distributor of computer games, contracting external developers to write the software. Their main products were gaming cartridges for the Atari 2600, ColecoVision and VIC-20. In late 1982, the company was renamed to Spectravideo due to a naming conflict with On Command Corporation's Hotel TV system called SpectraVision.

Harry Fox and Peter Law developed and patented an ergonomic joystick for Spectravideo. This was the basis for the QuickShot line of joysticks and other input devices produced by Spectravideo for video game machines and home computers.

In the early 1980s, the company developed 11 games for the Atari 2600, including several titles of some rarity: Chase the Chuckwagon, Mangia and Bumper Bash. A few of their titles were only available through the Columbia House music club.

The company's first attempt at a computer was an add-on for the Atari 2600 called the Spectravideo CompuMate, with a membrane keyboard and very simple programmability.

Spectravideo's first real computers were the SV-318 and SV-328, released in 1983. Both were powered by a Z80 A at 3.6 MHz, but differed in the amount of RAM (SV-318 had 32KB and SV-328 had 80KB total, of which 16KB was reserved for video) and keyboard style. The main operating system, residing in ROM, was a version of Microsoft Extended BASIC, but if the computer was equipped with a floppy drive, the user had the option to boot with CP/M instead. These two computers were precedent to MSX and not fully compatible with the standard, though the changes made to their design to create MSX were minor. The system had a wide range of optional hardware, for example an adapter making it possible to run ColecoVision games on the SVI. SpectraVideo also created the QuickShot SVI-2000 Robot Arm which could be connected to a Commodore 64 user port or be controlled stand-alone with two joysticks.

In May 1983, Spectravideo went public with the sale of 1 million shares of stock at $6.25 per share in an initial public offering underwritten by brokerage D. H. Blair & Co.

However, Spectravideo quickly ran into trouble. By December 1983 its stock had fallen to 75 cents per share. In March 1984, the company agreed to sell a 60% stake of itself to Hong Kong-based Bondwell Holding in a deal that would have also required the resignation of president Harry Fox and vice-president Alex Weiss. That deal was set aside when Spectravideo was unable to restructure about $2.6 million worth of debt, and another deal where Fanon Courier U.S.A. Inc. would have purchased 80% of the company was struck in July.

The Fanon Courier deal similarly fell through, and Fox resigned as president in September, with Bondwell Holding purchasing over half of the company's stock and installing Bondwell vice-president Christopher Chan as the new president.

In May 1984 the Spectravideo SVI-728 was released. This was a MSX compatible machine.

In 1985 the SVI-738, also MSX compatible was released. The machine came with a built-in 360 KB 3.5" floppy drive.

The last computer produced by Spectravideo was the SVI-838 (also known as Spectravideo X'Press 16), released in 1986. It was compatible with both the PC and MSX2 standards.

== Legacy ==
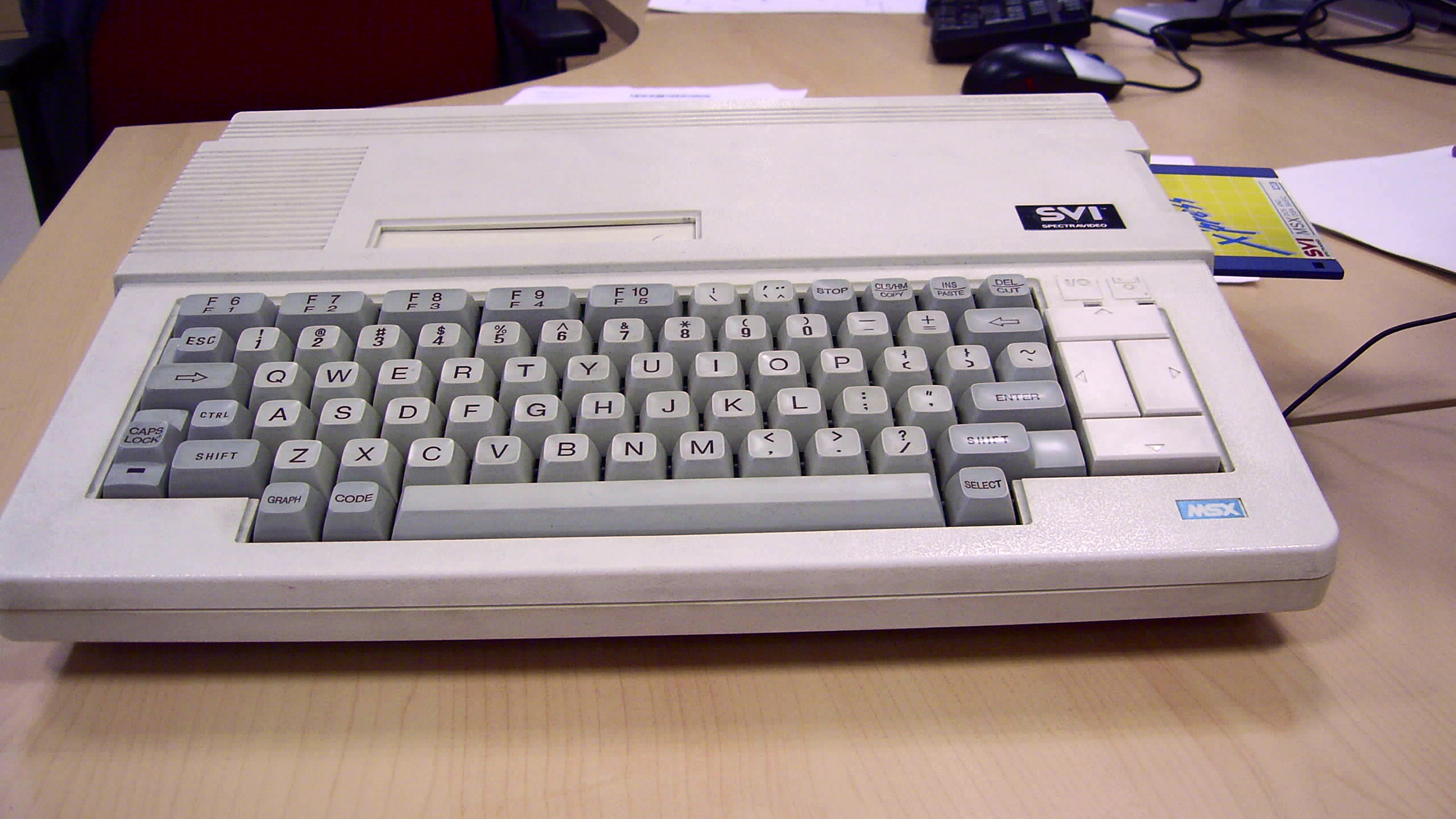
The SVI-738, a portable MSX computer

The Spectravideo name was used by a UK-based company called SpectraVideo Plc, formerly known as Ash & Newman. That company was founded in 1977, and bought the Spectravideo brand name from Bondwell in 1988. They sold a range of products branded as Logic3, and have no connection to the original Spectravideo products. The company changed its name to Logic3 in 2006, and entered administration in 2013 after a licensing deal with Ferrari proved to be a failure. The company was formally dissolved on 19 April 2016.

== List of video games ==
The following table lists of 60 commercial games for Spectravideo that are not compatible with MSX computers. Most were released in 1983–1984.

Title	Publisher	Release year
21	Spectravideo	
Antimeteor	Spectravideo	
Armoured Assault	Spectravideo	1983
Bobo	Spectravideo	
Bone of Contention	Spectravideo	
Busy Bee	Spectravideo	
Cake Bandit	Spectravideo	
Chest	Spectravideo	
Crunch	Spectravideo	1984
Emergency Landing	Spectravideo	1984
Findit	Spectravideo	1984
Flipper Slipper	Spectravideo	1984
Fluffy	JTM Soft	1987
Frantic Freddie	Spectravideo	1984
Ghostrap	Spectravideo	1983
Gobble	Spectravideo	
Graphic Chess	JTM Soft	1986
Grave Digger	Spectravideo	1984
Hare & Tortoise	Spectravideo	
Hubert	JTM Soft	1984
Killer Car	Spectravideo	1983
Kiwi Country	Spectravideo	1984
Kung Fu Master	Spectravideo	1984
Logit	Spectravideo	1984
Masterbrain	Spectravideo	
Moon Lander	Spectravideo	1984
Munch-a-Math	Spectravideo	1984
Ninja	Spectravideo	1984
Nomis	Spectravideo	1983
Old Mac Farmer	Spectravideo	1984
Othello	Spectravideo	
Para-Jump	Spectravideo	1984
Perilous Journey	Spectravideo	
Planet Patrol	Spectravideo	1983
Puzzle Master	Spectravideo	
Puzzlebrick	Spectravideo	
Rescue	Spectravideo	1984
Sasa	Spectravideo	1984
Sector Alpha	Spectravideo	
Spectra Break	Spectravideo	
Spectra Trader	Spectravideo	1984
Spectrabrain	Spectravideo	
Spectrafrog	Spectravideo	
Spectramind	Spectravideo	1984
Spectrapede	Spectravideo	
Spectron	Spectravideo	
Star Words	Spectravideo	1984
Supersaver	Spectravideo	
SV Jungle	Spectravideo	
Techtour	Spectravideo	
Telebunnie	Spectravideo	1984
Tennis	Spectravideo	
Tetra Horror	Spectravideo	1984
Think!	Spectravideo	
Treasure Chest	Spectravideo	1984
Trouble Trolley	Spectravideo	
Turboat	Spectravideo	1984
Uncle Albert	Spectravideo	1984
Uni's Learning Factory A	Spectravideo	
Uni's Learning Factory J	Spectravideo	
