= BASIC Programming =

- Developer(s): Atari, Inc.
- Publisher(s): Atari, Inc.
- Designer(s): Warren Robinett
- Platform(s): Atari 2600
- Release: April 1980

BASIC Programming is an Atari Video Computer System (later called the Atari 2600) cartridge that teaches simple computer programming using a dialect of BASIC. Written by Warren Robinett and released by Atari, Inc. in 1980, this BASIC interpreter is one of a few non-game cartridges for the console. The Atari VCS's RAM size of 128 bytes restricts the possibilities for writing programs.

== Details ==
Main display

The BASIC Programming display is divided into six regions:

- Program is where instructions are typed. It has a maximum of eleven lines of code.
- Stack shows temporary results of what the program does.
- Variables stores the values of any variables that the program is using.
- Output displays any output values that the program creates.
- Status shows the amount of available memory remaining.
- Graphics contains two colored squares that can be manipulated by the program.

Input is given through two Atari keypad controllers, which came with special overlays to show how to type the different commands and letters. Programs are restricted to 64 characters in size and normally 9 lines of code, limiting the programs that can be written (users can disable all windows except Program and keep selecting "New Line" until 11 lines of code are present).

=== Language features ===
VCS BASIC supports the following keywords:

- Statements: Print
- Structure: Goto, If-Then-Else
- Graphics: Clear
- Functions: Hit, Key
- Math: + - × ÷ Mod
- Relational operators: < > =

Unlike most BASIC implementations of the time:

- VCS BASIC uses ← instead of = for assignment; e.g., A←A+1.
- Statements can be strung together on a line without a delimiter; e.g., Note←APrintA.
- An If statement can be used as a function, returning a value: Ver1←Ver1+IfVer1Mod2Then8Else92
- If statements can take an Else clause.

Special variable names:

- Note sounds a musical note, assigned numbers from 0 to 7
  - Numbers assigned to Note are implicitly assigned modulus 8, thus 8 becomes 0, 9 becomes 1, etc.
- Hor1, Hor2 - the horizontal coordinate of one of two squares
- Ver1, Ver2 - the vertical coordinate of one of two squares

The language supports 26 unsigned integer variables A to Z. VCS BASIC supports integers from 0 to 99. Math operations wrap, so 99+1 becomes 0, 99+2 becomes 1, etc.

==== Sample code ====
The following example of a Pong game is provided.

1 Hor2←2+Key
2 <syntaxhighlight lang="cbmbas" class="" style="border:none; padding: 0px 0px; color:var(--color-base, #202122); background:transparent; " inline="1">IfVer1>90ThenVer1←88</syntaxhighlight>
3 <syntaxhighlight lang="cbmbas" class="" style="border:none; padding: 0px 0px; color:var(--color-base, #202122); background:transparent; " inline="1">IfHit</syntaxhighlight><syntaxhighlight lang="cbmbas" class="" style="border:none; padding: 0px 0px; color:var(--color-base, #202122); background:transparent; " inline="1">ThenVer1←9</syntaxhighlight>
4 <syntaxhighlight lang="cbmbas" class="" style="border:none; padding: 0px 0px; color:var(--color-base, #202122); background:transparent; " inline="1">Ver1←Ver1+IfVer1</syntaxhighlight>[[Modulo operation|Mod]]2<syntaxhighlight lang="cbmbas" class="" style="border:none; padding: 0px 0px; color:var(--color-base, #202122); background:transparent; " inline="1">Then8</syntaxhighlight><syntaxhighlight lang="monkey" class="" style="border:none; padding: 0px 0px; color:var(--color-base, #202122); background:transparent; " inline="1">Else</syntaxhighlight>92
5 Hor1←Hor1+7
6 <syntaxhighlight lang="cbmbas" class="" style="border:none; padding: 0px 0px; color:var(--color-base, #202122); background:transparent; " inline="1">Goto1</syntaxhighlight>

== See also ==
- List of Atari 2600 games
- Spectravideo CompuMate
- Family BASIC
