= Hotel television systems =

Infotainment content provided on a hotel TV

Hotel television systems (sometimes also referred to as hotel TV) are the in-suite television content presented in hotel rooms, other hotel environments and in the hospitality industry for in-room entertainment, as well as hospitals, assisted living, senior care and nursing homes. These services may be free for the guest or paid, depending on the service and the individual hotel's or hotel chain's policy. Generally these services are controlled by using the remote control.

== Services ==
Hotel television is generally available as free to guest services, which may include local channels and satellite or cable programming, or as interactive television, which provides services such as video on demand or any other paid services including movies, music, adult content, and other services. In some cases hotel TV also means a bundle of interactive services that are made available on a guest's TV screen such as a hotel welcome screen with hotel information, hotel services, an information portal with weather, news and local attractions, video games, internet applications, internet television, movie rental services, and order and shopping for the hotel's amenities. In other cases, some hotels may have information channels consisting of looping videos promoting the local area.

=== Cable and satellite television systems ===
Commonly a hotel television system distributing satellite television signal is known as a satellite master antenna TV (SMATV) system. In an L-band distribution system television signal is sent from the satellite dish to a panel in a distribution closet to a set top box in each room which decrypts the digital signal via a coaxial network. In a headend type of system, the signal is encrypted by a Qam at the headend to prevent piracy and then distributed via a COM3000 from Technicolor, or similar hotel television headend. In an IPTV system, all video, voice and data are transmitted over an internal hotel IP network.

In cable or satellite TV systems, signal may be distributed via a coaxial network of IP networks either to a set-top box in each room through an L-band type system or directly to Pro:Idiom encrypted television sets through a headend type hotel television system.

=== Signal distribution ===
Satellite television, cable television and over-the-air (OTA) signals as well as locally generated programming such as hotel guest welcome screens and other hotel information and services can be distributed via an L band type system, COM3000 HD/4K Pro:Idiom headend from Technicolor, or an IPTV type distribution system. In most hotels, a television signal provided by a satellite television or cable television provider or OTA antenna is transmitted over a hotel coaxial cable network. Most hotels today are wired only with coaxial cables. Some newer hotels are pre-wired with UTP or CAT-5/6 cabling, which enables IP-based hotel television services. For hotels wired with coaxial cable, technology has emerged recently which enables some to take advantage of IP-based signal transmission over coax cables.

== See also ==
- Cable television headend
- L band
- SpectraVision
