= SV-318 =

8-bit home computer by Spectravideo

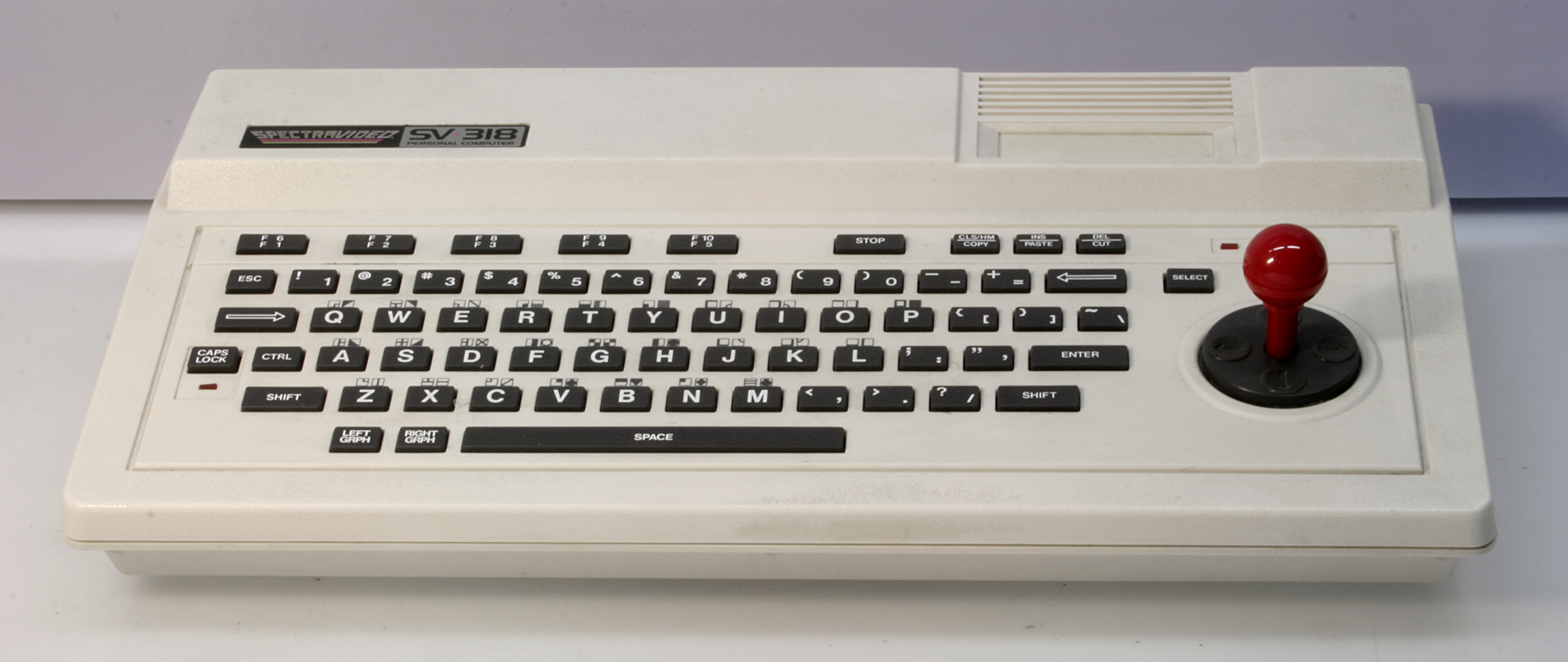
- Product family: Spectravideo
- Type: Home computer
- Released: 1983 (Winter CES, Las Vegas)
- Operating system: Microsoft Extended BASIC
- CPU: Zilog Z80A @ 3.6 MHz
- Memory: 16 KB
- Removable storage: ROM Cartridge, cassette tape (1200 baud), 5¼-inch floppy disks
- Display: 256×192, 15 colours; TV or composite monitor
- Graphics: TMS9918 (16 KB video memory)
- Sound: AY-3-8910
- Input: Keyboard
- Related: SV-328

The SV-318 is the basic model of the Spectravideo range. It was fitted with a chiclet style keyboard, which was difficult to use, alongside a combination cursor pad/joystick. This is a disc-shaped affair with a hole in the centre; put a red plastic 'stick' in the hole and with a built-in joystick, remove the stick and it is a directional arrow pad for word processing etc. This machine also had only 16 KB of user RAM (plus an additional 16 KB of video RAM), which limited its usefulness. However, this could be expanded via an external peripheral box.

This machine is basically identical to its big brother the SV-328, the only differences being in the keyboard and amount of memory. The two machine's ROM, expandability, mainboard and case were identical.

Reference to the operating system Microsoft Extended BASIC is not to be confused with MSX BASIC, although some marketing at the time claimed that Microsoft Extended is what MSX stood for. The SV-318 is not fully compliant with the MSX standard.

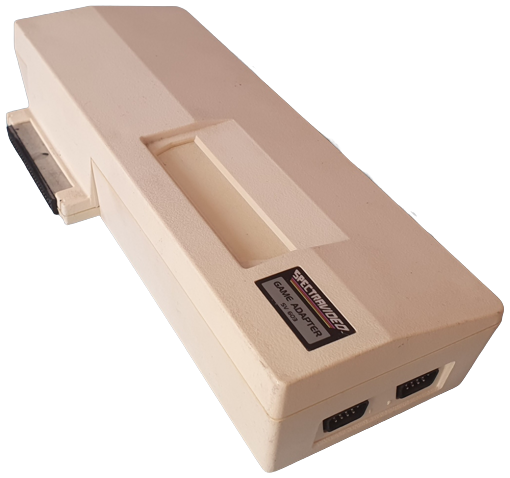
Spectravideo SVI-603 game adapter

In 1983, Spectravideo announced the SV-603 ColecoVision Video Game Adapter for the SV-318. The company stated that the $70 product allowed users to "enjoy the entire library of exciting ColecoVision video-game cartridges".

== Reception ==
Popular Mechanics in February 1984 stated that the Spectravideo SV-318 "is worth searching out ... a very nice little machine". The magazine liked the integrated joystick and "stunning" graphics, but advised consumers to consider the small software library before purchasing.

More than 130 games were released for the system.

== System specs ==
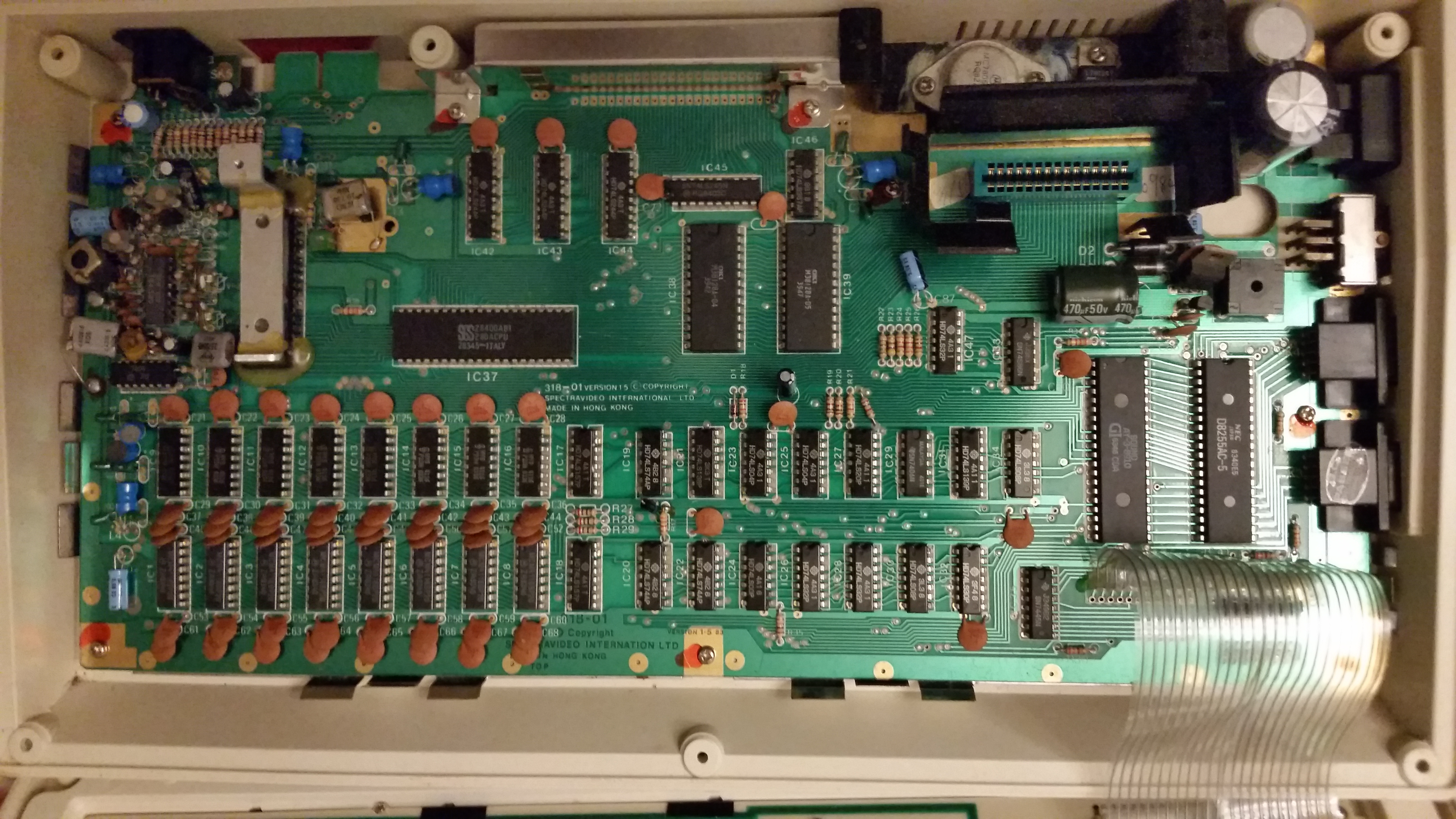
SV-318 motherboard

- Processor: Zilog Z80A running at 3.58 MHz
- ROM: 32 KB
  - BIOS (16 KB)
  - BASIC (16 KB)
- RAM: 16 KB
- Video Display Processor: TMS9918
  - VRAM: 16 KB
  - Text modes: 40×24
  - Resolution: 256×192(32x24) with 15 colours
  - Sprites: 32, 1 colour, max 4 per horizontal line
- Sound chip: General Instrument AY-3-8910 (PSG)
- Programmable Peripheral Interface: Intel 8255
