= SpectraVision (Hotel TV system) =

Former hotel entertainment system

- Type: Hotel video-on-demand service
- Industry: Hospitality technology
- Predecessor: Spectradyne, Inc.
- Founded: 1973
- Fate: Acquired by On Command Corporation
- Successor: On Command Corporation
- Area served: Worldwide
- Products: Hotel television Video on demand Interactive guest services
- Parent: Spectradyne, Inc.

SpectraVision was an American hotel in-room entertainment and video-on-demand (VOD) service developed by Spectradyne, Inc. Beginning in the mid-1970s, the platform enabled hotel guests to purchase and watch feature films on demand from their guest room televisions using centrally managed video playback systems. It is regarded as one of the earliest commercially successful implementations of video-on-demand technology in the hospitality industry.

== History ==
=== Early Development (1973–1979) ===
Spectradyne Inc. was established in 1973 in Richardson, Texas by Bob Moorehead, Bob Briggs, Jerry Henderson, Bob Vogelsang and Earl Winkelman. The aim of the company was to develop communications and television distribution systems for the hospitality industry. The company adopted the trade name SpectraVision for a communications platform capable of transmitting television programming and digital control information over a hotel's existing coaxial cable network.

During the late 1970s, Spectradyne began deploying SpectraVision systems in hotels across the United States. Early installations typically consisted of central equipment rooms housing industrial-grade videocassette recorders, computer-controlled switching equipment and billing interfaces connected to hotel property management systems. Although primitive by later standards, these systems represented one of the first commercially successful implementations of interactive television within the hospitality industry and laid the groundwork for the rapid expansion of hotel video-on-demand during the following decade.

Early systems relied on banks of industrial videocassette recorders located in a hotel's central equipment room. Each recorder typically contained a single movie title, playing popular films at certain scheduled times to be accessed by multiple guests simultaneously. A computer controller monitored playback equipment, processed guest requests and managed connections between the video sources and individual rooms.

=== Expansion (1980–1989) ===
During the 1980s, SpectraVision expanded from a hotel communications platform into one of the largest providers of in-room entertainment services in North America. The growth of the premium cable television industry, increasing consumer familiarity with pay television, and improvements in video storage technology created demand for hotel-based movie services that allowed guests to select films on demand rather than follow scheduled broadcasts. The company's systems combined centralised video libraries with computer-controlled switching equipment, allowing individual hotel rooms to access different films simultaneously through the property's existing television distribution network.

By the middle of the decade, SpectraVision had become one of the dominant suppliers of hotel in-room entertainment systems in the United States. The company installed systems in major hotels and resorts, providing feature films, adult programming, music channels and hotel information services, with systems installed in approximately 1,500 hotels and serving more than 500,000 guest rooms.

Following its success in the United States, SpectraVision began expanding internationally through partnerships with major hotel groups operating overseas properties. The system appeared in selected international hotels in markets including Canada, Mexico, Australia, New Zealand and parts of South-East Asia. International deployment was often associated with large hotel chains that sought to provide consistent guest entertainment services across multiple locations.

=== Corporate restructuring and decline (1989–2000) ===
SpectraVision entered the 1990s facing significant financial and technological challenges. The analogue videotape-based systems that had driven its rapid expansion required substantial investment to maintain, while emerging digital video technologies promised greater capacity but required expensive infrastructure upgrades. Spectradyne began developing digital video platforms intended to replace analogue playback systems. These systems used compressed digital video stored on computer servers, allowing larger film libraries, improved reliability and simultaneous access to popular titles.In the first quarter of 1990, the company reported a net loss of approximately US$19 million on revenue of US$35.4 million, reflecting the pressure created by debt servicing costs and declining profitability in the hotel entertainment market. The company also faced increasing competition from rival providers as hotel operators began demanding more advanced interactive services rather than traditional pay-per-view movie systems.

In 1995, SpectraVision entered Chapter 11 bankruptcy protection. At the time of filing, the company reported approximately US$521.1 million in assets and US$521.7 million in liabilities. The company's difficulties were attributed to several factors, including debts, high cost of converting from analogue videotape systems to digital video servers, slower-than-expected growth in hotel pay-per-view revenue and increasing competition within the hospitality entertainment industry.

The company subsequently entered negotiations with potential buyers, leading to its acquisition by On Command Corporation in 1996. Over time, hotels transitioned from the SpectraVision platform to On Command-branded systems. By the early 2000s, most remaining SpectraVision installations had either been upgraded or replaced by digital hospitality television systems.

== Significance ==
SpectraVision is considered an important precursor to modern video-on-demand and pay-per-view services. Although the system predated consumer streaming services by decades, it introduced several concepts that later became central to digital entertainment platforms:

- Centralised media libraries
- User-selected playback
- Electronic programme guides
- Automated billing
- Individualised viewing experiences

== See also ==
- Hotel television systems
- LodgeNet
