= WSX =

WSX may refer to:

- Wrestling Society X, a short-lived professional wrestling television series broadcast in 2007
- Westsound/WSX Seaplane Base, a seaplane base with IATA code WSX
- FS-A1WSX, a home computer
- Interleukin-27 receptor, a cell receptor
- Warm Springs extension, an extension of Bay Area Rapid Transit to Warm Springs
