= IGB Eletrônica =

Brazilian consumer electronics company

IGB Eletrônica S.A.
- Type: Sociedade Anônima
- Traded as: B3: IGBR3
- Industry: Electronics
- Founded: 1964
- Headquarters: Manaus, Brazil
- Key people: Eugênio Emílio Staub, (CEO)
- Products: televisions, flat panels, LCDs, plasma display, DVDs, hi-fi, home theater, portable audio, karaoke machines
- Revenue: ▲US$ 588.2 million (2012)
- Net income: ▲US$ 86.2 million (2012)
- Number of employees: 18,400
- Website: www.igbeletronica.com www.gradiente.com.br

IGB Eletrônica S.A. (Portuguese for IGB Electronics), doing business as Gradiente, is a Brazilian consumer electronics company based in Manaus, and with offices in São Paulo. The company designs and markets many product lines, including video (e.g. televisions, DVD players), audio, home theater, high end acoustics, office and mobile stereo for the Brazilian market.

== History ==
The company was founded in 1964. Between 1985 and 1990 they sold the Gradiente Expert line of MSX compatible home computers. In 1993 they founded Playtronic, a fully owned subsidiary that licensed the manufacturing of Nintendo consoles in Brazil, and while publishing games for various systems they also provided Portuguese translations of some games (among them, South Park and Shadow Man for the Nintendo 64). However, they stopped the partnership with Nintendo in 2003 because of the high price of the dollar at the time.

In 1997, Gradiente established a joint venture with Finland-based telecommunications manufacturing firm Nokia, where they were granted the license to manufacture variants of Nokia mobile phones locally under the Nokia and Gradiente brand names.

== iPhone trademark conflict ==
In 2000, Gradiente, now legally known as IGB Eletrônica SA, filed for the brand name "iphone" in Brazil's INPI (National Institute of Industrial Property, the trademark authority). Gradiente first used the iPhone brand on a licence-built variant of the Nokia 7160, but it was not until 2008 when the Brazilian government granted full brand ownership for Gradiente, and the company has since sold Android-based smartphones under this name. Until 2008 that trademark was fully owned by IGB Eletrônica SA, which released its Android-powered iphone neo one under the Gradiente brand. The iphone neo one is sold for R$ 599 (about US$287), a dual-SIM handset running Android 2.3.4 Gingerbread. It has a 3.7-inch, 320 x 480 display, a 700 MHz CPU, 2GB of expandable storage, Bluetooth, 3G, WiFi and 5 / 0.3-megapixel camera.

== See also ==
- List of phonograph manufacturers
- Gradiente Expert
