= Panasonic FS-A1WSX =

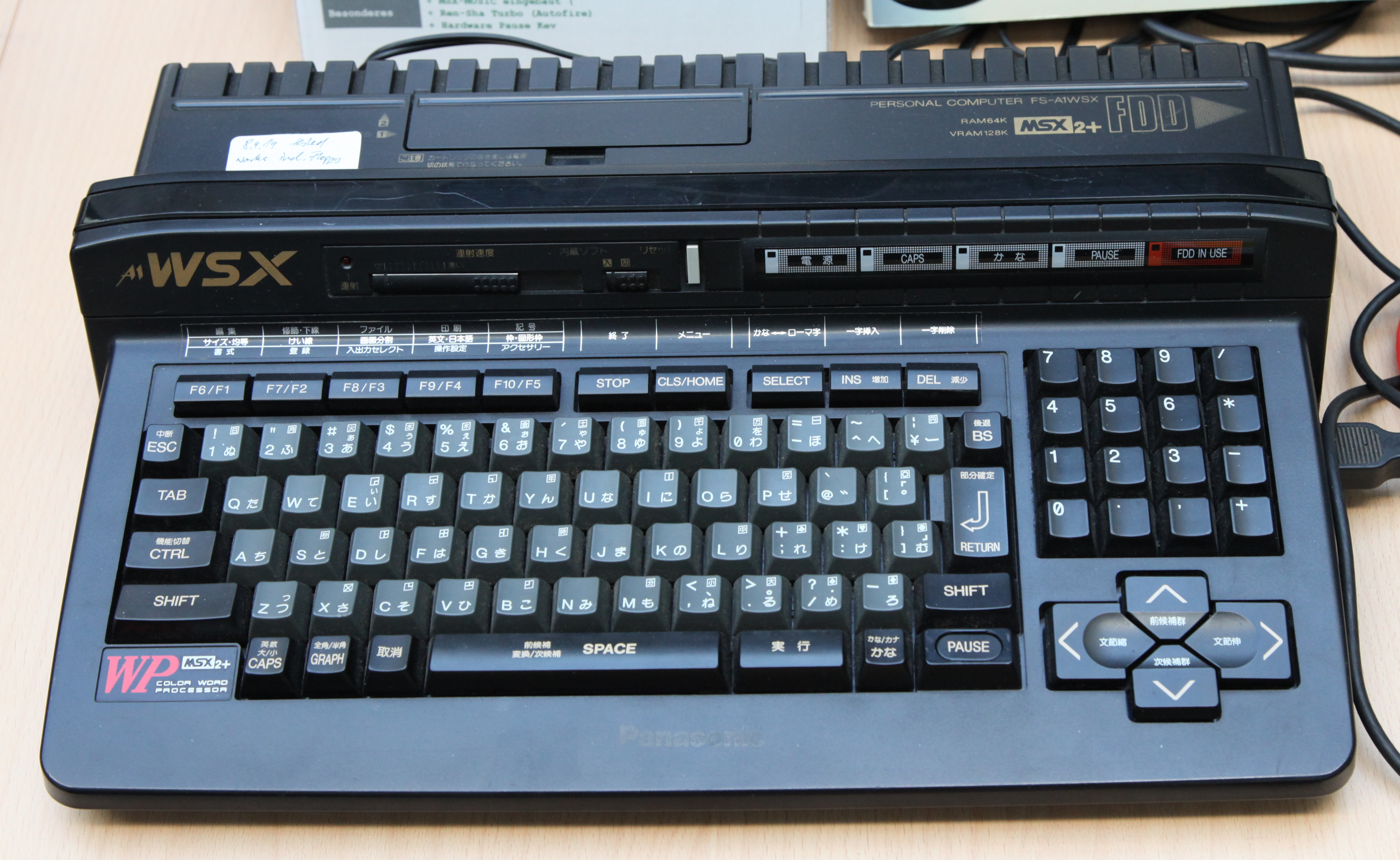
- An FS-A1WSX
- Manufacturer: Panasonic
- Product family: MSX
- Type: Home computer
- Generation: MSX2+
- Released: 1989
- Operating system: MSX BASIC V3.0, MSX-DOS, CP/M
- CPU: MSX-Engine T9769x @ 3.58 and 5.37 MHz
- Memory: 64 KB–256 KB (max.)
- Storage: 720 KB 3.5" floppy disks
- Display: Yamaha V9958 (aka MSX-Video)
- Graphics: 512 × 212 (16 colours out of 512) and 256 × 212 YJK (19,268 colours)
- Sound: 3 voices (PSG) + 9 channel FM (OPLL)
- Predecessor: FS-A1WX
- Successor: FS-A1ST Turbo R

The Panasonic FS-A1WSX released in 1989 was the last MSX2+ made by Panasonic. It was the successor of FS-A1WX and incorporated few changes like S-Video output, no tape support, color printer support and an improved A1 Internal Cockpit software with a Kanji color word processor.

Contrary to other MSX2+ systems the Panasonic FS-A1 used a Z-80 compatible MSX-Engine (T9769x) which could be switched via software to 6 MHz. This model supported up to 256 KB of RAM after doing a little soldering. 512 KB was also possible with a more complicated modification.

== Technical specifications ==
Processor
- Z80 compatible MSX-Engine (T9769x) with clock speeds of 3.58 and 5.37 MHz
Memory
- ROM: 1552 KB
  - MSX BASIC v3.0: 80 KB
  - MSX Disk BASIC v1.0: 16 KB
  - Music BASIC (FM BIOS): 16 KB
  - JIS 1st & 2nd class Kanji Support: 256KB
  - MSX-JE: 512KB
  - MSX-JE/WP (MSX Word Processor): 656 KB
- RAM: 64 KB
- VRAM: 128 KB
- SRAM: 16 KB
Display
- VDP
  - Yamaha YM9958
  - Text: 80×24, 40×24 and 32×24 (characters per line × lines)
  - Graphical: resolution max 512×212 pixels (16 colours out of 512) and 256×212 (19,268 colours)
  - Colours: 19,268 max
  - Sprites: 32 max
Sound
- PSG
  - Yamaha AY-3-8910 (embedded in MSX Engine)
- MSX Music
  - Yamaha OPLL YM-2413
Storage Memory
- 720 KB 3 1/2" DD/DS floppy disks
