= Gradiente Expert =

1985 Brazilian home computer

Expert
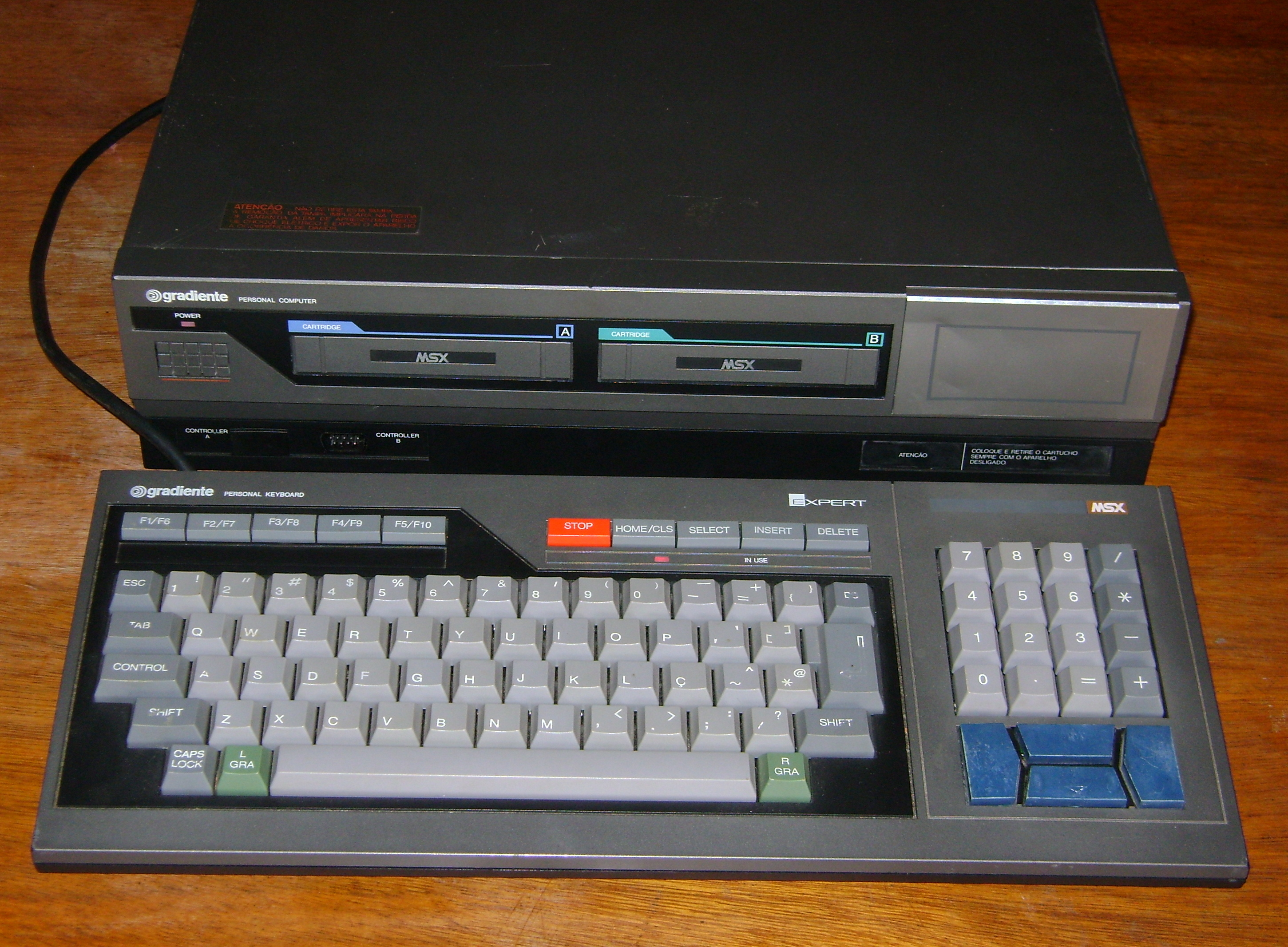
- Also known as: Expert XP-800
- Manufacturer: Gradiente Eletrônica
- Type: home computer
- Released: December 1985
- Discontinued: 1990
- Operating system: MSX BASIC, MSX-DOS, CP/M
- CPU: Zilog Z80A @ 3.58 MHz
- Memory: 64 KB–4096 KB (max.)
- Removable storage: Cassette tape, cartridges, floppy discs
- Graphics: TMS9918
- Sound: AY-3-8910
- Backward compatibility: MSX
- Successor: Expert GPC-1

The Expert (or Expert XP-800), made by Gradiente Eletrônica (to date best known as a game console and Hi-Fi equipment company) was the second and last MSX home computer launched in the Brazilian market, in the mid-1980s.

It was presented to the public at the 5th International Computing Fair, nicknamed "Informatica '85". The event took place at Anhembi Convention Center in the city of São Paulo from September 23 to 29, 1985. At the announcement, the computer was priced 65 ORTN s.

Its market release date was 1 December 1985, one week after Epcom's Hotbit, just in time for 1985's Christmas and with a massive media campaign on magazines, newspapers and TV. In the newspapers ads the initial offer price was Cr$ 4,640,000, or US$470 by the value at the time, or US$1,390 by Q2 2025.

The machine was a clone of the National CF-3000, with a computer case resembling a stereo system, a detached keyboard with a proprietary connector, no caps lock LED and no reset key, although the soft-reset could be achieved by pressing simultaneously the keys Shift + Control + Delete, while a hard-reset could be achieved by pushing in either of the cartridge slot covers, if they were free.

The Expert XP-800 was followed by the Expert GPC-1 ("Gradiente Personal Computer") in 1987, and by Expert Plus and Expert DD Plus (a system with a built-in 720 KB 3 1/2" floppy disk drive) in 1989.

The Expert users waited for an MSX2 machine, but Gradiente never produced it and discontinued the MSX line in 1990.

== Versions XP-800/GPC-1 ==
The two first versions had a graphite case and socketed chips, which caused a chronic problem: when the machine heated, the chips frequently pulled out and the system "froze". Also, the GPC-1, released in 1987, had a ROM slightly modified to solve an ASCII table compatibility issue with the other popular Brazilian MSX, Sharp's Hotbit.

== Versions Plus/DD Plus ==
The last two versions had a black case and the problematic socketed chips were replaced by an ASIC. Nevertheless, the RAM was mapped to a secondary slot and, although it was straight by the MSX standards, caused a lot of crashes with programs who searched for memory in the wrong place. It did not contribute for the popularity of any of the Plus versions.

These machines used the MSX-Engine T7937A instead of the Z80A CPU of previous models.

== Technical specifications ==
CPU	Zilog Z80A (XP-800 & GPC-1) @ 3.58 MHz; MSX-Engine T7937A (Plus & DD Plus) @ 3.58 MHz
VDP	TMS9918
RAM	64 KB
VRAM	16 KB
ROM	32 KB
Keyboard	mechanic, 89 keys (with 4 cursor keys), number pad
Display	text: 40×24 rows; graphics: 256×192 pixels, 16 colours, 32 sprites
Sound	General Instrument AY-3-8910 (PSG), 3 voices, white noise
Ports	2 joystick connectors, TV out, RGB monitor out, sound out, tape recorder connector, parallel port, 2 cartridge slots
Storage	tape recorder (1200/2400 bit/s) or one or two external floppy drives (5 1/4", 360 KB or 3 1/2", 720 KB)

== Peripherals ==
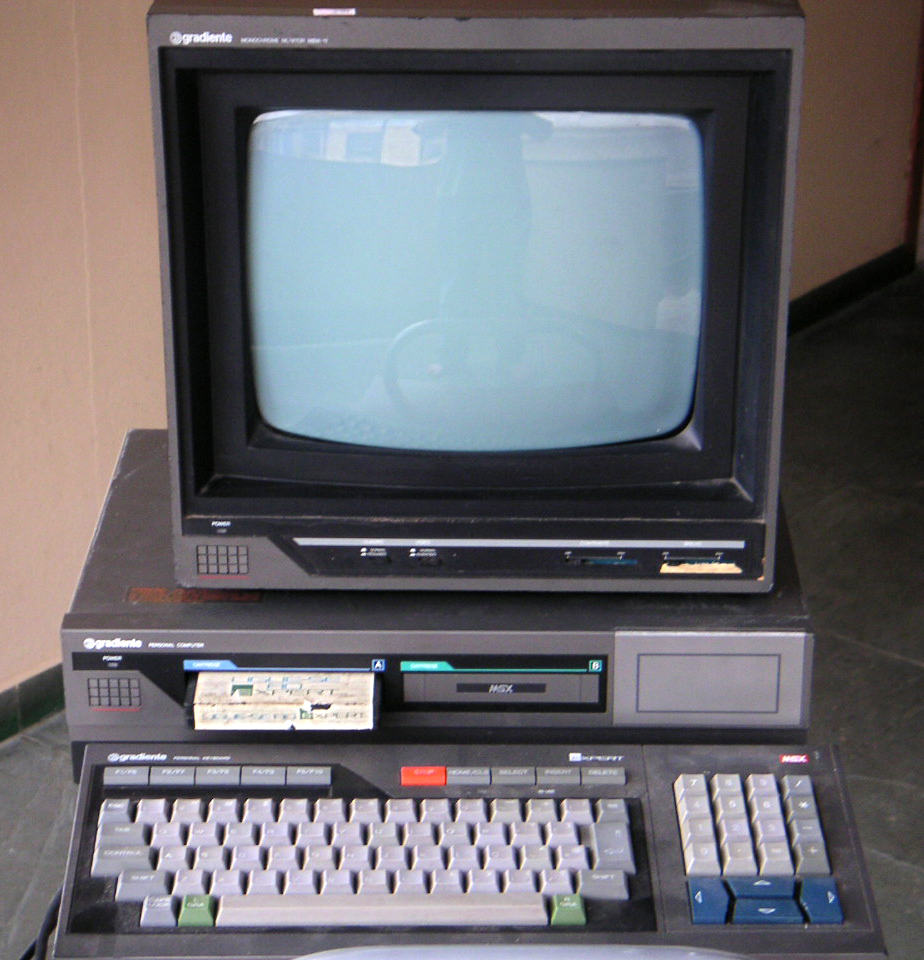
Expert with the MBW-12 green CRT monochrome monitor

- DR-1 ("data-corder"): tape recorder
- JS-1: joystick
- MBW-12: 12" green CRT monochrome monitor
- TA-1: TV adapter
- TM-1: 1200/75 bit/s modem with a RS-232C port
