= Hotbit =

MSX home computer sold in Brazil

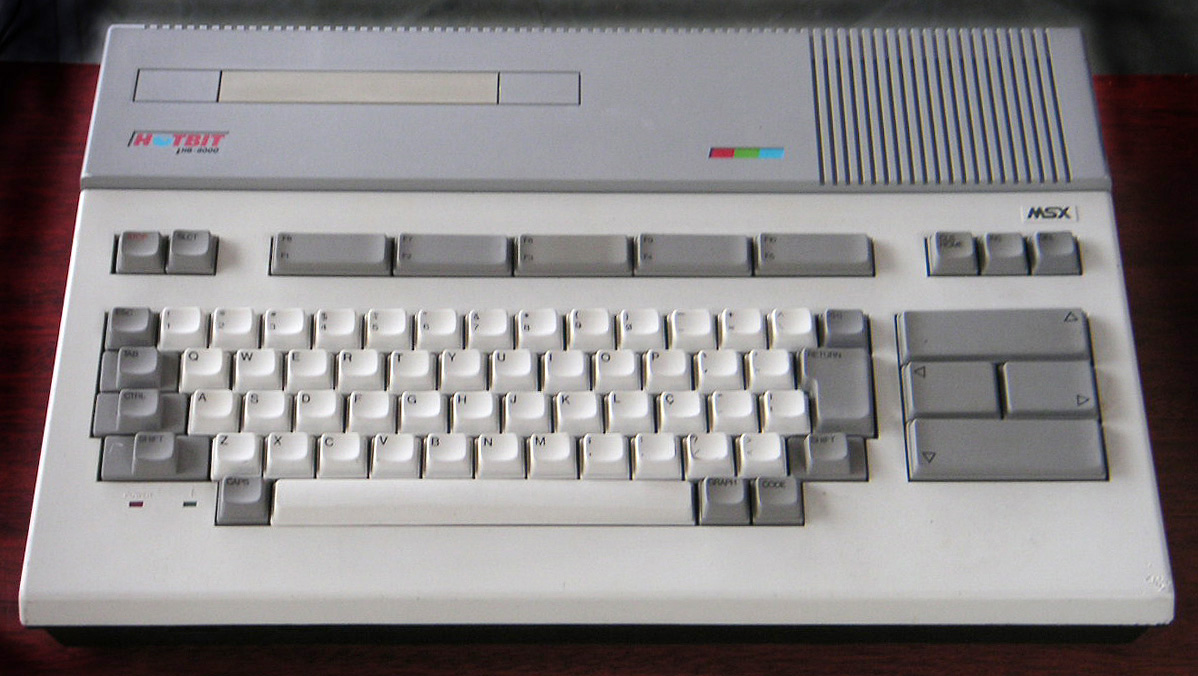
- Developer: Sharp
- Manufacturer: Epcom
- Type: Home computer
- Released: November 1985
- Discontinued: 1988
- Operating system: MSX BASIC, MSX-DOS, CP/M
- CPU: Zilog Z80A @ 3.58 MHz
- Memory: 64 KB–512 KB (max.)
- Removable storage: Cassette tape, cartridge, floppy discs (optional)
- Display: 40×24 text characters; 256×192 pixels; 16 colours, 32 sprites
- Graphics: TMS9928NL, (V9938 optional)
- Sound: AY-3-8910
- Backward compatibility: MSX

The Hotbit HB-8000 is an MSX home computer developed and sold by the Brazilian subsidiary of Sharp Corporation through its Epcom home computer division in mid-1980s. The MSX machines were very popular in Brazil at the time, and they virtually killed all the other competing 8 bit microcomputers in the Brazilian market.

== Versions 1-1.2 ==
The Hotbit had three versions: 1.0 and 1.1 with gray and white case and 1.2, with a black case and a ROM slightly modified to solve an ASCII table compatibility issue with the other popular Brazilian MSX, the Gradiente Expert.

== Technical specifications ==
The HB-8000 had the following technical specifications:

CPU	Zilog Z80A @ 3.58 MHz
RAM	64 KB (expandable to 512KB)
VRAM	16 KB (TMS9928NL)
ROM	32 KB
Keyboard	mechanic, 73 keys (with 4 cursor keys), reset key
Display	text: 40×24 rows; graphics: 256×192 pixels, 16 colours, 32 sprites
Sound	General Instrument AY-3-8910 (PSG), 3 voices, white noise
Ports	2 joystick connectors, PAL-M composite or RF out, sound out, tape recorder connector, parallel port, 2 cartridge slots
Storage	tape recorder (FSK, 1200/2400 bps) or one or two external 5 1/4" disk drive (360 KB)

== Peripherals ==
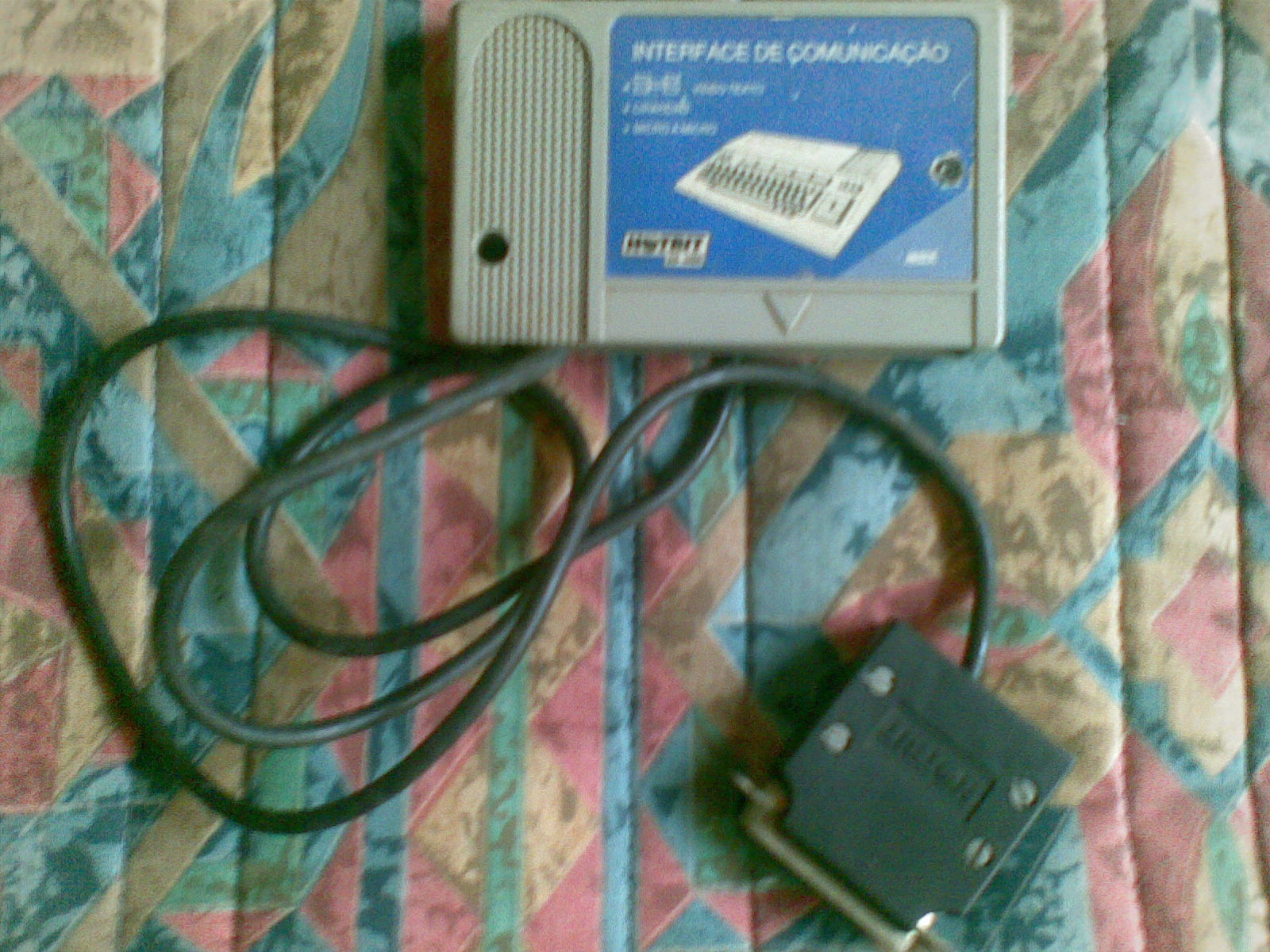
Serial interface for external Modem HB-3000.

- HB-100: joystick
- HB-2400: tape recorder
- HB-3000 or HB-3001: external modem
- HB-3600: Dual disk drive controller and power supply. Sold in a bundle with one HB-6000 drive
- HB-4000: 80 columns card with the V9938 VDP inside
- HB-4100: 64KB RAM expansion
- HB-6000: 5 1/4" disk drive (slim height), 360 KB
