= Zemina =

Software company

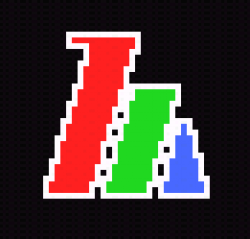
- Company type: Private
- Industry: Video games
- Founded: 1981
- Defunct: 1992
- Fate: Out of business
- Headquarters: South Korea

Zemina (Korean: 재미나, originally 제미나) was a South Korean software maker brand of Saehan Trading (Korean: 새한 상사) founded in 1981. They primarily made games for the Daewoo Zemmix, but because it was an MSX computer made to look and be played like a game console, they work on other MSX computers as well. Although many of them were copies of other games, like Super Boy I (based on Super Mario Bros.), they also produced some more original ones in their later years.

Korea did not have a copyright law for computer programs until July 1987. Because of that, many companies, including Zemina, sold unauthorized copies of foreign titles with their own copyright hacked in. Even after that, the new law protected only the program code, not the intellectual property as a whole, so a lot of their "own" games were ports of famous Japanese games.

Most of their titles were converted to the Master System as well. In 1992, they engaged in developing exclusive games for the Master System and Famicom consoles, but not all of them were released.

They even released Nemesis 3: The Eve of Destruction under official license from Konami under the title Salamander II - all the while still selling multi game cartridges full of unlicensed copies of older Konami games.

== Zemina games ==
=== List of clones ===
Game	Year	System(s)	Clone of
1942	1987	MSX, MSX 2	1942
Alla II	1990	MSX	The Seven Adventures of Sindbad
Block Hole	1990	MSX	Quarth
Brother Adventure	1987	MSX, MSX 2	Mario Bros.
Double Dragon	1989	MSX	Double Dragon
F-1 Spirit: The Way to Formula-1	1987	Master System	F-1 Spirit: The Way to Formula-1
Flashpoint	1990	MSX, Master System	Tetris
Green Beret	1987	MSX	Green Beret
Hyper Olympic 1	1984	MSX	Track & Field
King Kong 2: Yomigaeru Densetsu	1987	MSX2	King Kong 2: Yomigaeru Densetsu (hack of the original with English screen text)
The Micro Xevious	1990	MSX	Xevious: Fardraut Saga
Nemesis	1987	Master System	Gradius
Nemesis 2	1987	Master System	Nemesis 2
New Boggle Boggle	1988	MSX	Bubble Bobble (with new stages)
New Boggle Boggle 2	1989	MSX	Bubble Bobble (again with new stages)
Penguin Adventure	1987	MSX	Penguin Adventure
Soko	1990	MSX	Soukoban
Project A2	1987	MSX 2	Project A2
Puznic	1990	MSX	Puzznic (with new stages)
Strange Loop	1990	MSX	Strange Loop
Street Master	1992	MSX	Street Fighter (with characters from Street Fighter II)
Super Bio Man 4	1990	MSX	Super Mario Bros. 3, Super Boy (a clone of Super Mario Bros. made by the same company)
Super Boy I	1989	MSX, Master System	Super Mario Bros. (only 4 worlds)
Super Boy II	1989	MSX, Master System	Super Mario Bros.: The Lost Levels (only 4 worlds)
Super Boy 3	1991	MSX, Master System	Super Mario World
Super Boy 4	1992	Master System	Super Mario World (different character sprite)
Super Bubble Bobble	1989	MSX	Bubble Bobble
Tengoku Yoitoko	1988	MSX	Tengoku Yoitoko
The Three Dragon Story	1989	MSX, Master System	Knightmare
Volguard	1990	MSX	Vanguard
Warp & Warp	1984	MSX	Warp & Warp
Won-Si-In	1991	MSX, Master System	Adventures of Dino Riki
Won-Si-In 2	Unreleased	Master System	-

=== List of original games ===
Game	Year	System(s)	Notes
Cyborg Z	1991	MSX, Master System	
Eagles 5	1990	MSX	Also known as Doksuri 5 Hyeonjae.
Magic Kid Googoo	1992	Famicom	Only game from Zemina to be developed for the NES.
Tatica	1990	MSX	

Note 1: The clone game Block Hole is also known as Sagak-ui Bimil.
Note 2: Other releases that are merely hacks of Japanese games with Zemina's logo are not listed here.

== Hardware ==
Zemina also made hardware for the Zemmix. These include:

- A Cartridge port divider
- The Zemina Music Box
- An MSX2 Upgrade Kit
- A Zemmix PC card
- MSX RAM expansion cards
- A 'Family Card' that allows the user to play Famicom games on the Zemmix
