= FMSX =

Portable MSX emulator

fMSX is a portable MSX emulator written by Marat Fayzullin. It is one of the earliest MSX emulators, and is also the most ported. fMSX is written in C with emphasis on portability. fMSX was a very influential and a number of emulators started as forks of fMSX, including blueMSX and paraMSX. The Z80 emulation code by Marat Fayzullin has been used on many other emulators.
