= Zemmix =

Defunct domestic South Korean video game console manufactured by Daewoo Electronics

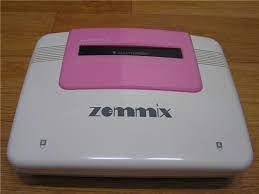
- Zemmix CPC-50
- Manufacturer: Daewoo Electronics
- Product family: MSX
- Type: Video game console
- Generation: Third generation era
- Lifespan: SK: 1985
- Discontinued: 1995
- Media: ROM cartridge
- CPU: 8-bit Zilog Z80

Zemmix is a line of MSX-compatible video game consoles produced by South Korean electronics company Daewoo Electronics Co., Ltd. between 1985 and 1995. The consoles were not sold outside South Korea.

== Hardware ==
=== Console Models ===
All consoles were designed to broadcast standard NTSC, have low and high outputs for connecting to a TV and have a universal adapter for connection to the mains 120/230 volts.

The consoles also had a letter coming after the serial number. These letters indicated the color combination of the console. The key is as follows.

- W - white and silver colors
- R - red and black colors
- B - yellow, blue and black colors

For example, CPC 51W would be a white or silver Zemmix V (see below).

==== Consoles compatible with the MSX standard ====
- CPC-50 (Zemmix)
- CPC-51 (Zemmix V)

==== Consoles compatible with the MSX2 standard ====
- CPC-61 (Zemmix Super V)

==== Consoles compatible with the MSX2+ standard ====
- CPG-120 (Zemmix Turbo)

==== FPGA based MSX2+ compatible console ====
- Zemmix Neo (by Retroteam Neo)
- Zemmix Neo Lite (by Retroteam Neo)

==== Raspberry PI based MSX2+ (Turbo R) compatible console ====
- CPC-Mini (Licensed)- Zemmix Mini (by Retroteam Neo)

=== Peripherals ===
Other Zemmix products:

==== By Daewoo ====
- CPJ-905: MSX joystick for Zemmix CPC-51 console
- CPJ-600: MSX joypad for Zemmix CPC-61 console
- CPK-30: keyboard for Zemmix CPC-61
- CPJ-102K: joystick for CPC-330
- CPK-31K: input device for CPC-330

==== By Zemina ====
- A Keyboard & Cartridge port divider
- The Zemina Music Box
- An MSX2 Upgrade Kit
- A Zemmix PC card
- MSX RAM expansion cards
- A 'Family Card' that allows the user to play Famicom games on the Zemmix

== Software ==
Korean software companies that produced software for the Zemmix gaming console:

- Aproman
- Boram
- Clover
- Daou Infosys
- FA Soft
- Mirinae
- Prosoft
- Screen
- Topia
- Uttum
- Zemina

Most Zemmix software works with other MSX/MSX2/MSX2+ computers too.
