= Philips NMS-1205 =

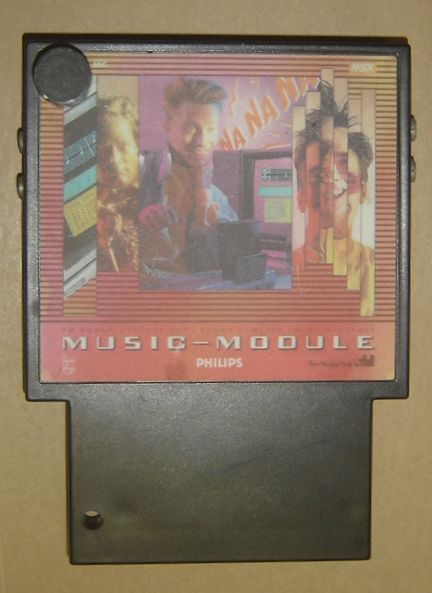
Philips Music Module

The Philips NMS-1205 was a MSX AUDIO cartridge (without BIOS) using the Yamaha Y8950 chip (released in 1984). NMS-1205 was only sold in Europe for the MSX Personal Computer.

This cartridge featured FM sound synthesizer, Sound sampler (ADPCM with 32 kB sample RAM), MIDI interface, audio & MIDI I/O connectors, and also built-in software (Music-BOX, CALL MUSICBOX).

== Features ==
FM sound synthesizer : OPL (FM Operator Type-L) compatible

- 2 RCA mono Audio-out connectors
- Volume adjuster (Sample volume)

Sound sampler : 32kB sampleRAM for the ADPCM unit

- Audio-in connector (mono, RCA, to sample from a line-level source)
- External microphone connector (mono)
- Built-in microphone (mono)
  When an external microphone or line-level source is connected, the internal microphone is automatically disabled.

MIDI interface : In/Out/Thru

- Connector for music keyboard (NMS-1160)

Built-in software : Music-BOX, CALL MUSICBOX
