= Penguin Adventure =

1986 video game

- European box art
- Developer: Konami
- Publisher: Konami
- Directors: Ryouhei Shogaki; Hiroyuki Fukui
- Designer: Ryouhei Shogaki
- Programmer: Hiroyuki Fukui
- Composers: Yoshinori Sasaki; Kenichi Matsubara
- Platforms: MSX; Mobile
- Release: MSX; JP: 28 October 1986; EU: 1987; Mobile; JP: 31 May 2006
- Genres: Racing, platform
- Modes: Single-player, multiplayer

Penguin Adventure (夢大陸アドベンチャー, Yume Tairiku Adobenchā; lit. 'Dream Continent Adventure') is a racing platform game released by Konami in 1986, and a sequel to 1983's Antarctic Adventure. The game marks the professional debut of game designer Hideo Kojima, who participated in the planning.

The story follows Penta, a penguin who has to bring home a golden apple in order to cure Penguette, the Penguin Princess.

== Gameplay ==
This title significantly expanded upon the gameplay of Antarctic Adventure by most notably adding a greater variety of stages and enemies and role-playing elements: boss fights, purchasable items, and several minigames. Items can be purchased through three different fisherman, in exchange for fish, that give Penta new abilities. One of the items that can be bought is a gun.

Level design and variety have increased from Antarctic Adventure; there are forest levels, ice levels, water-based levels, caves, and even some outer-space bonus levels. There are several shortcuts, usually hidden underneath holes (which are typically harmful hazards) in the game, that allow the player to go on almost completely different paths. The game features multiple endings, with the hidden good ending available when the player pauses the game a certain number of times. In the bad ending, the princess dies, while in the good ending, she lives.

Some publications have stated that Kojima reused the idea for multiple endings from this game in Metal Gear Solid and, to an extent, Metal Gear Solid 2: Sons of Liberty, due to it often being cited as his debut game. However, Kojima himself has stated that he only participated in the project for about a month to help plan the game, pitching suggestions such as the slot machine in the shop and how to defeat the bosses. Additionally, his name does not appear in the credits either. Kojima's first game credit and directorial debut would be with Metal Gear, released for the MSX2 the next year.

== Ports ==
- Zemina, a South Korean video game company, made an unauthorized Master System port with the same title, credited as Kkum-Uidaelyug (Korean: 꿈의대륙, romanized: Dreamland) on the cartridge, which was published towards the end of the 1980s.
- The MSX version was re-released on several platforms during the years: first on PlayStation and Sega Saturn as part of Konami Antiques MSX Collection in 1997/1999, then on Virtual Console (first for Wii on 24 November 2009, later for Wii U on 29 January 2014) in Japan, and on PC on 11 April 2014 in Japan (as Project EGG).
- A mobile version was released on 31 May 2006 only in Japan.

== Other media ==
- Penguin Adventure: Penta no daibōken Korokorokokoro no Penko-hime

夢大陸アドベンチャー -ペン太の大冒険 コロコロココロのペン子姫- (Yume Tairiku Adobenchā: Penta no daibōken Korokorokokoro no Penko-hime)
- Manga
- Published by: Konami Digital Entertainment
- Magazine: Weekly Konami Magazine
- Published: 15 September 2006 - 2 February 2007
- Volumes: 20

In 2006, Konami Digital Entertainment Tokyo serialized a series of digital comics based on the video game of the same name, titled Yume Tairiku Adobenchā: Penta no daibōken Korokorokokoro no Penko-hime (夢大陸アドベンチャー -ペン太の大冒険 コロコロココロのペン子姫-, lit. 'Dream Continent Adventure: Penta's Adventure, Penguette's Colosse Heart').
