= Yamaha Y8950 =

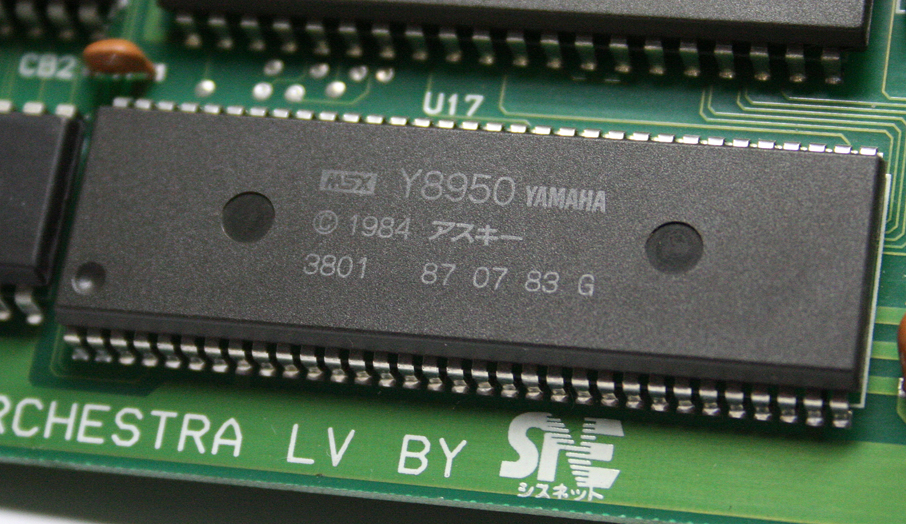
Yamaha Y8950

The Yamaha Y8950 is a sound chip, produced in 1984. It is also known as MSX-AUDIO as it was designed for inclusion in an expansion cartridge for the MSX personal computer.

The Y8950 is essentially a Yamaha YM3526 with an ADPCM encoder/decoder added on. It was introduced in three cartridge models:

- Philips NMS-1205
- Toshiba HX-MU900
- Panasonic FS-CA1

== Features ==
- Compatible with the Yamaha YM3526 (OPL)
- Nine voices of FM synthesis (using phase modulation)
- Two sound-generation modes available: Simultaneous sounding of nine tones or 6 melodies and five rhythms (Compatible with the Character and Pattern Telephone Access Information Network (C.A.P.T.A.I.N.) system and teletex).
- Built-in vibrato and AM oscillators
- Built-in accelerated 4-bit ADPCM speech analysis/synthesis circuits
- Possibility of connecting an external 256-kB RAM plus 256-kB ROM
- Built-in 8-bit input/output ports for keyboard scanning
- Built-in 4-bit general-purpose I/O port
- Two built-in general-purpose timers
- TTL compatible input/output
- Si-gate CMOS LSI
- 5V single power supply
- 64-pin SDIP encapsulation (the same thing was done on the V9938)

== Software Support ==
The Y8950 is supported by almost all software that contains music composed in SoundTracker, (Moonblaster, Oracle, Super Music Editor or Magic Music Module Combi, etc.). All these editors support the ADPCM sample unit. Other software that makes use of the ADPCM sampler, such as Trax Player by NOP (a program to play songs (samples) directly from disk, while loading) also supports it.

The majority of games made by Compile on the MSX were MSX-AUDIO compatible, although they didn't use the ADPCM sampler portion of the sound chip.

== History ==
Developed in 1984, the Y8950 was primarily targeted at the MSX home computer market, where it was used in MSX-AUDIO expansion cartridges. Three main models were produced:

• Philips NMS‑1205

• Toshiba HX‑MU900

• Panasonic FS‑CA1

The chip’s integration in the MSX-AUDIO standard provided better audio capabilities compared to other computers of that era.

See also

- List of sound chips
- Yamaha OPL
