= MSX-Engine =

Japanese computer chip

An MSX-ENGINE chip is a specially developed integrated circuit for home computers that are built according to the MSX specifications. Generally, such a chip combines the functions of many separate, older/simpler chips into one. This is done to reduce required circuit board space, power consumption, and (most importantly) production costs for complete systems.

The first MSX-Engine chip, the T7775, operated next to a standard Zilog Z80-clone chip, the main CPU of the system, but most later versions of the engine also included the Z80 (clone) CPU in a same single chip package. The S-1990, is a special case, as it's not really an MSX-Engine, but a chip that was used as "glue logic" between the MSX-engine and an external R800 CPU.

The T9769 is used in MSX 2 computers, while in MSX 1 computers mostly the T7775 and T7937 are used. You can also find the S-1985 and S-3527 in these systems. After the MSX 2 generation (from MSX2+ onwards) Toshiba took over the complete production of MSX engine chips. The last generation of MSX, the Turbo-R used the NEC S-1990 "TurboR bus controller" together with a R800 CPU. MSX engine chips from Yamaha were mostly used in MSX-computers from Sony and Philips, while the Toshiba chips were mostly used in computers from Sanyo and Matsushita (Panasonic/National).

== Overview ==
Here is a short overview of MSX-Engine chips.

=== MSX 1 ===
Yamaha S3527

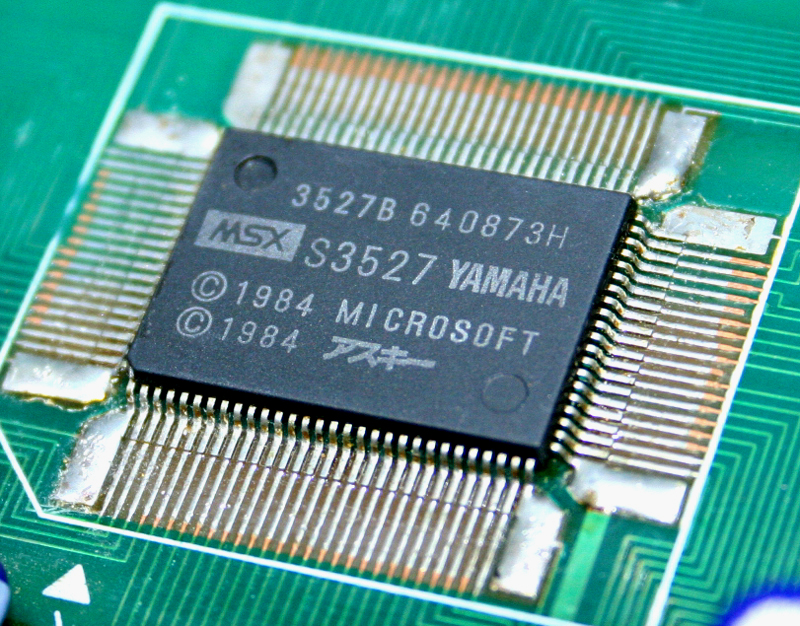
Yamaha S-3527 MSX-Engine

- a Yamaha YM2149 PSG-sound chip, compatible with a General Instrument AY-3-8910
- parallel I/O chip: backward compatible with the Intel i8255
- standard MSX1 functions: DRAM control, slot selection, joystick ports, cassette/printer interface etc.
- 100 pins

Note that this IC is also used in many MSX2 computers, but does not include any MSX2-specific functions. In such machines, these are implemented using additional IC's

Sony MB64H131

- Intel i8255
- printer port

Toshiba T7775

- CMOS-chip with all MSX 1 functions.

Toshiba T7937(A)

- main CPU, a Zilog Z80 (clone) with a clock speed of 3,58 MHz.
- PSG-sound chip, compatible with a AY-3-8910
- Video Display Controller: T6950 rev. B (TMS9918 compatible)
- parallel I/O chip: backward compatible with the Intel i8255
- MSX 1-functions
- dimensions: 10,5 × 8,60 mm

Hitachi HD62003

- AY-3-8910 compatible PSG
- DRAM controller
- PPI i8255 functions

=== MSX 2/MSX 2+ ===
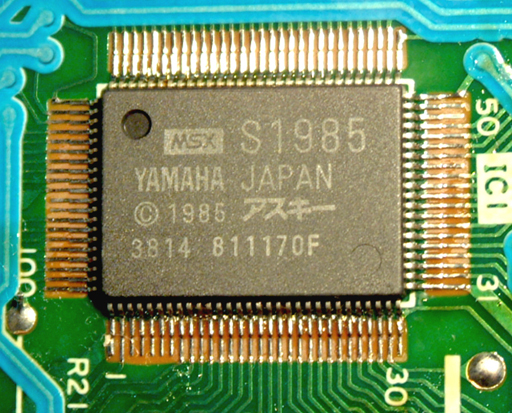
Yamaha S-1985 MSX-Engine

Yamaha S1985

- a Yamaha YM2149 a Programmable Sound Generator - sound chip, compatible with a General Instrument AY-3-8910
- parallel I/O chip: backward compatible with the Intel i8255
- MSX1- and MSX2-functions (up to 512 KB memory mapper)
- Real Time Clock (Ricoh RP5C01A compatible) including 26 x 4 bits RAM, backed up by (separate) battery
- 100 pin flat plastic package

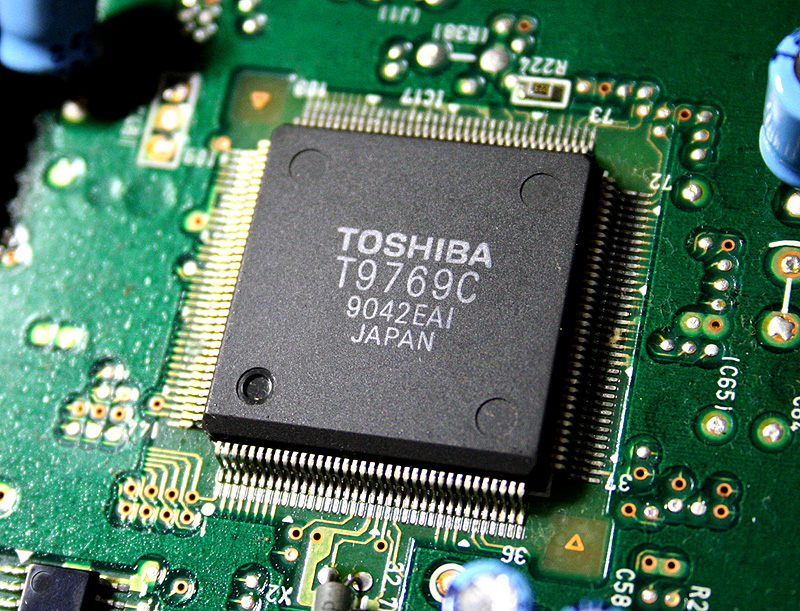
Toshiba T9769C MSX-ENGINE

Toshiba T9769

- main CPU, a Zilog Z80 clone with a clock speed of 3,58 MHz (MSX2; switchable to 5,36 MHz on some MSX2+ machines)
- a Programmable Sound Generator - sound chip, compatible with a General Instrument AY-3-8910
- parallel I/O chip: backward compatible with the Intel i8255
- MSX1 and MSX2-functions (MSX2-computers)
- MSX2+-functions (MSX2+-computers)
- dimensions: 10,5 × 8,60 mm

=== MSX turbo R ===
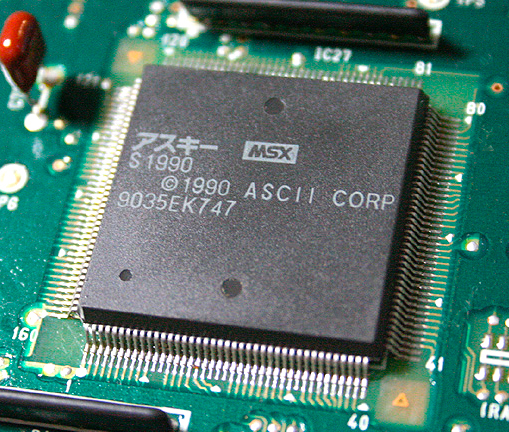
ASCII S-1990 TurboR bus controller

NEC S1990, combined with a Toshiba T9769C

The S1990 is not in itself an MSX-engine but acts like "bus controller", it is the combining element that combines the Z80 inside the T9769C (the actual MSX engine) and a R800 CPU, and the memory and slot logic and other hardware inside the T9769C. It also contains hardware to assists in the debugging of software.
