= OPN =

OPN may stand for:

- Osteopontin, a glycoprotein secreted by osteoblasts
- Object Process Network, a simulation model meta-language
- Ordering Part Number, a identifiying system for AMD processors
- Optics & Photonics News, a magazine
- Oneohtrix Point Never, recording alias of musician Daniel Lopatin
- Olivary pretectal nucleus, a nucleus in the pretectal area, or pretectum
- In mathematics, odd perfect number
- Ora pro Nobis, Latin phrase litt. meaning "pray for us", often abbreviated as OpN in prayer books and breviaries
- FM Operator Type-N, a series of sound chips made by Yamaha:
  - YM2203 (OPN)
  - YM2608 (OPNA)
  - YM2610 (OPNB)
  - YM2612 (OPN2)
  - YMF288 (OPN3)
