= Yamaha YM2612 =

FM synthesis sound chip by Yamaha

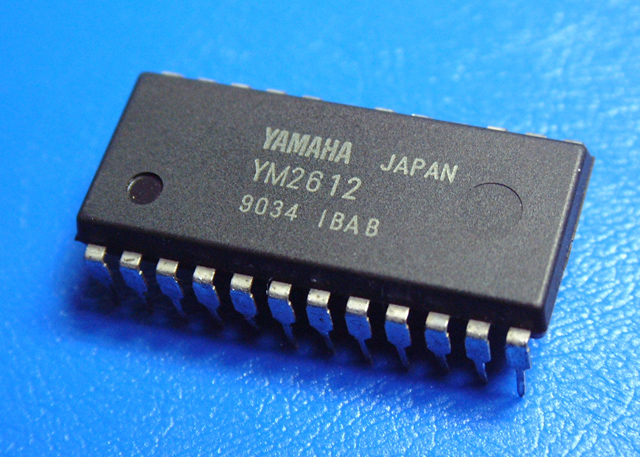
Yamaha YM2612

The YM2612, a.k.a. OPN2, is a sound chip developed by Yamaha. It is a member of Yamaha's OPN family of FM synthesis chips, and was developed as a stripped-down version of the YM2608.

The YM2612 is a six-channel FM synthesizer used in several game and computer systems, most notably in Sega's Mega Drive/Genesis video game console as well as Fujitsu's FM Towns computer series. It was also available in CMOS form as the YM3438, a.k.a. OPN2C.

As with the YM3438, it was used by Sega in various arcade game systems, including the Mega-Play, Sega System C and Sega System 32; the YM3438 core was also integrated into an ASIC in later revisions of the Mega Drive/Genesis.

== Features ==
The YM2612 has the following features:

- Six concurrent FM synthesis channels (voices)
- Four operators per channel
- Two interval timers
- A sine-wave low frequency oscillator (LFO)
- Integrated stereo output digital-to-analog converter (DAC) (most other contemporary Yamaha FM chips require a separate DAC chip)
- Per-channel programmable stereo sound (left, right, or both left and right resulting in centre)
- For channel three, operator frequencies can be set independently, making dissonant harmonics possible (Normally, they would have a simple relation like e.g. 2× or 3× relative to a common base frequency). This is shared across multiple chips in the OPN series.
- For channel six, basic playback of sampled audio can be enabled via a register on the chip, disabling FM output for that channel but allows for a single channel for samples in 8-bit pulse-code modulation (PCM) format, with sampling rates being controlled by software (Note: Maximum sampling rates for PCM playback on the YM2612/YM3438 are 26.6 KHz on the Mega Drive/Genesis, 29 KHz on Sega System 32, and 44.1 KHz as the maximum possible sampling rate) (This channel is often referred to as the "DAC" channel, which primarily refers to the chip's built-in 9-bit DAC output).

== Technical details ==
Pinout of the Yamaha YM2612 chip. The packaging is a standard 24-pin DIP.

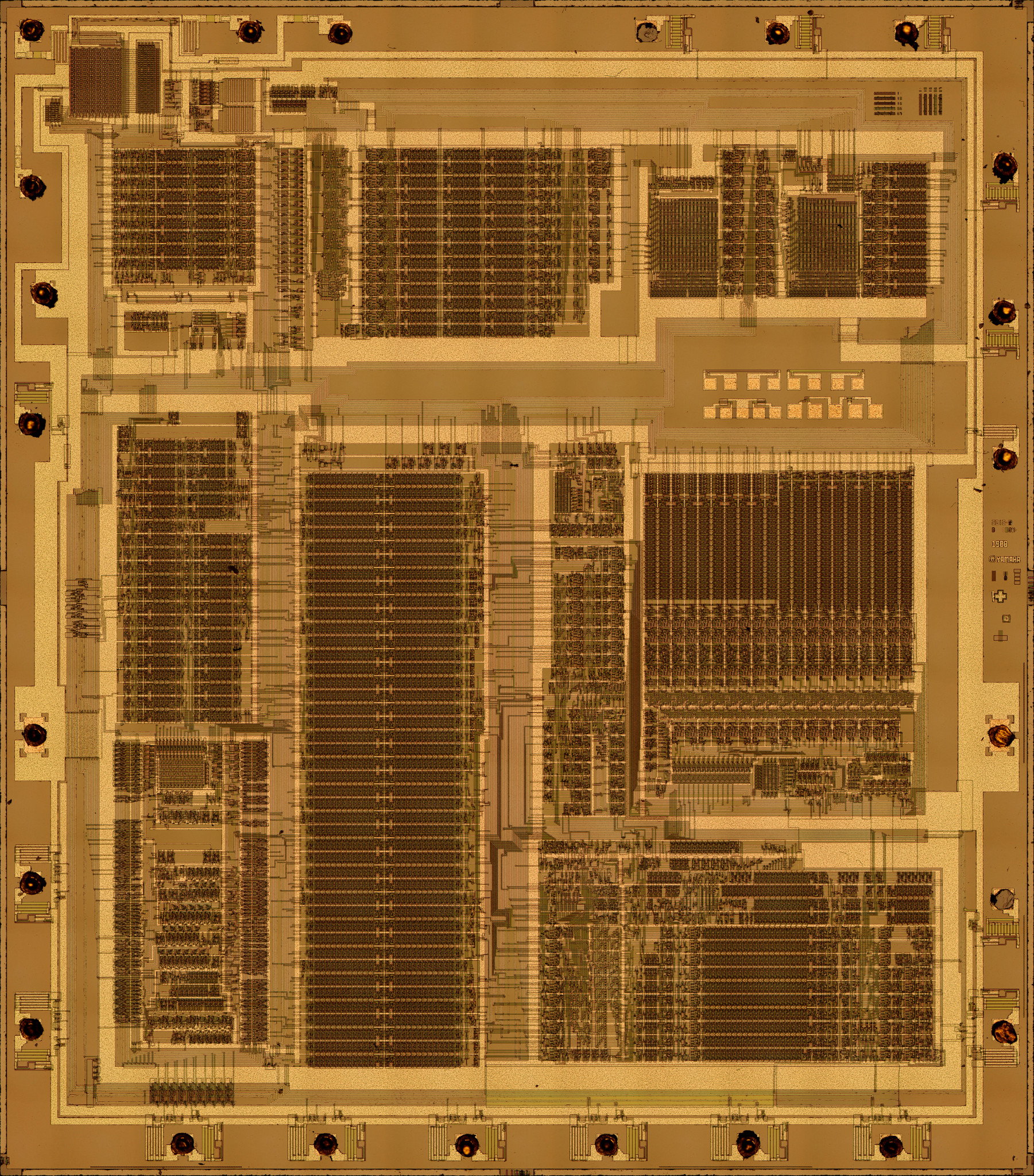
A die shot of the Yamaha YM2612.

The YM2612 is based on the FM block featured in the YM2608 (which itself was based on the YM2203), integrating a stereo output DAC and LFO, but removes the SSG component (although the vestigial SSG envelope generator remains on the chip's core) and GPIO ports found on all other OPN chips such as the YM2203 and YM2608 (all of which were part of the YM2149F core that is integrated into most OPN series chips) as well as the seven ADPCM channels (one ADPCM, six Rhythm) found on its larger sibling.

While high-end chips in the OPN series have dedicated ADPCM channels for playing sampled audio (e.g. YM2608 and YM2610), the YM2612 does not. However, its sixth channel can act as a basic channel for samples by the means of a 'DAC Enable' register, allowing it to play 8-bit PCM sound samples. Unlike other OPN chips with ADPCM support, the YM2612 does not provide any timing or buffering of samples, so all frequency control and buffering must be done in software by the host processor.

=== Low volume distortion of the built-in DAC ===
An example of the low volume distortion created by the peculiar qualities of the YM2612's built-in DAC. This sample is from the Mega Drive game Beyond Oasis.

In some cases, this low volume distortion can affect the loudness, and to some degree the timbres, of certain sounds. This sample is from the Mega Drive game Streets of Rage 2.

Unlike most Yamaha FM chips which require an external floating-point DAC, the YM2612 features a built-in 9-bit DAC, which uses time-division multiplexing to play one sample of each channel in sequence, similar to the YM2413.

Due to an error with the amplitude voltage in the original chip design, a peculiar form of crossover distortion is introduced in the output. This is known as the low volume distortion bug (and historically given the terms "TDM distortion" (Note: TDM distortion is shorthand for "time-division multiplexing distortion") and "ladder effect"), where any output that is sufficiently low in volume undergoes an exaggerated quantization, including any usage of fades in video game music. Some games released early in the Mega Drive/Genesis' lifespan had their music written around this distortion to generate unique timbres or effects, such as After Burner II. As a consequence, games that used this musical trick would sound too quiet on the later YM3438 variant as well as its integrated ASIC version found in later Mega Drive/Genesis consoles.

Also, because of the reduced dynamic range of the built-in DAC, additional distortion may be generated when playing sounds with a very high volume.

=== Variants ===
==== Yamaha YM3438 ====
The YM3438, a.k.a. OPN2C, is a modified CMOS version of the YM2612, commonly used in Sega's arcade system boards as well as being used in Fujitsu's FM Towns Marty. This version has an improved built-in DAC that significantly reduces the presence of crossover distortion from the original chip with a higher signal-to-noise ratio than the YM2612. It is not a direct, drop-in replacement for the YM2612 however, as the sound outputs have higher impedance.

==== Yamaha YMF276 ====
The YMF276, a.k.a. OPN2L, is a low-powered version of the YM3438, used in later models of Fujitsu's FM Towns series (particularly the FM Towns II models), which came in a much smaller physical 24-pin SOP package. Unlike the YM2612 and YM3438, the YMF276 requires an external DAC chip like most other Yamaha FM chips. In this case, an equivalent external DAC chip such as the YM3433B (as used in the FM Towns II models) is used. Because of this, it does not produce significant crossover distortion as with the YM2612/YM3438 chips due to the use of an external DAC chip.

==== Yamaha-created ASICs ====
The custom ASICs made by Yamaha for use with Sega's Mega Drive/Genesis, which were used in the final revision of the original model and most revisions of the revised models (FC1004, FF1004 and FJ3002) as well as the Genesis 3 released by Majesco (FJ3002 and FQ8007), contains a YM3438 core directly on the ASIC. The ASICs contained both the video and sound chips (and later the main CPU and sound CPU on the FJ3002 and FQ8007 ASICs) combined into one chip, which also includes the YM7101 VDP that houses the integrated Texas Instruments SN76489 PSG. The YM3438 core used in these revisions have been modified to further reduce the presence of crossover distortion more so than with standalone YM3438 chips.

=== Emulation ===
Emulated versions of the YM2612 and its variants have been in development since the advent of video game console emulators (especially those for the Mega Drive/Genesis) and even arcade game emulators such as MAME. Advancements in emulation and reverse engineering of the chips have faithfully reproduced the inner workings and sound generation of the chips with near accurate results, as well as reproducing certain quirks such as the YM2612's crossover distortion and features such as the SSG envelope generator and undocumented registers. Cycle-accurate emulation of the YM2612 and its variants have also been developed, using die shot reverse engineering of the chips.

The majority of emulators for the Mega Drive/Genesis (as well as arcade emulators like MAME) have implemented various emulated versions of the YM2612, with most modern Mega Drive/Genesis emulators having the option to replicate the sound outputs of the original and revised models of the Mega Drive/Genesis by using the emulated YM2612 or YM3438 cores (which can also be used in conjunction with a low-pass filter to further simulate an original model Mega Drive/Genesis) or by implementing a function in the emulated chip to apply a crossover distortion effect to simulate a YM2612.

== Game audio ==
Used in conjunction with the Texas Instruments SN76489 PSG as the main sound generators of the Sega Mega Drive/Genesis console, the YM2612 was prominently utilized by numerous prolific video game music composers, most notably Yuzo Koshiro.

== See also ==
- VGM – an audio file format for multiple video game platforms, including the Sega Mega Drive/Genesis
- Yamaha YM2203
- Yamaha YM2608
- Yamaha YM2610
