= Digital sound revolution =

Adoption of digital audio technology in the computer industry

The digital sound revolution (or digital audio revolution) refers to the widespread adoption of digital audio technology in the computer industry beginning in the 1980s.

== Prior methods ==
=== Software-based pulse-width modulation ===
Some of the first computer music was created in 1961 by LaFarr Stuart, who wrote software to modulate the duration of and between pulses (pulse-width modulation or "PWM", via a process now often referred to as "bit banging") on a bus line that had been connected to an amplified speaker originally installed to monitor the functioning of Iowa State University's CYCLONE computer, a derivative of the Illiac. The entire computer was used to create simple, recognizable tunes using digital audio.

The speakers in the IBM PC (released in 1981) and its successors may be used to create sounds and music using a similar mechanism.

=== Programmable sound generators ===
Programmable sound generators were the first specialized audio circuits in computers included simple analog oscillators that could be set to desired frequencies, generally approximating tones along the musical scale. An example of this is the 1978 POKEY custom ASIC used in the Atari 8-bit computers.

=== FM synthesis ===
The next development was to produce a base frequency, and then modulating it with another frequency to create desired effects; this process of audio waveform synthesis using frequency modulation is usually referred to as FM synthesis. This technology was introduced in the early 1980s by Yamaha, which began manufacturing FM synth boards for Japanese computers such as the NEC PC-8801 and PC-9801 in the early 1980s. This allowed personal computer game audio to have greater complexity than the simplistic beeps from internal speakers. These FM synth boards produced a "warm and pleasant sound" that musicians such as Yuzo Koshiro and Takeshi Abo utilized to produce video game music that is still highly regarded within the chiptune community.

Early integrated circuit devices to incorporate FM synthesis methods include the Yamaha OPL2 chip set (YM3812 and external digital-to-analog converter) was included on the AdLib sound card (1987), on the Creative Technology Sound Blaster (1989), and on the Media Vision Pro AudioSpectrum (1991); these were replaced by the next generation Yamaha OPL3 chip set on the Pro AudioSpectrum 16 and Sound Blaster 16.

== Digital-to-analog converters ==
As they became more cost-effective, digital-to-analog converter (often called "D-to-A"—abbreviated "D/A", or "DAC") integrated circuits augmented and ultimately replaced FM synthesis devices. These devices enabled computers to play digital audio using an encoding technique known as pulse-code modulation ("PCM"). Unlike pulse-width modulation ("PWM"), which turns a signal on and off, pulse-code modulation also allows the level of a signal to be set to several intermediate levels; in this regard, PWM is similar to black-and-white images, PCM is similar to grayscale images.

Digital audio compact discs (using PCM) were introduced in 1982. Starting in 1985, the medium was adapted for the storage of computer data via the Yellow Book CD-ROM standard and the High Sierra Format (which evolved in ISO 9660).

The Macintosh 128K (1984) and Atari ST (1985) could produce digital audio via software. Without dedicated audio hardware, digital audio on these machines were usually limited to title screens in games (at higher sampling rates) or games which did not feature heavy animation which left enough CPU time to play lower quality samples.

The first computer to with a digital sound processor was the Amiga released in 1985. The MOS Technology 8364 Paula chip has four independent 8-bit DACs and can play either four mono audio channels or two combined stereo channels. It could play samples from memory with virtually no CPU usage or any clever software tricks.

In 1989, the Creative Technology Sound Blaster included a processor and digital-to-analog converter, plus the Yamaha OPL2 chip set FM synthesis devices for compatibility with the AdLib sound card. In 1991, Media Vision introduced the original Pro AudioSpectrum, which offered similar functionality but introduced stereo sound, an audio mixer and CD-ROM interface (SCSI and many variants); its 16-bit successor, the Pro AudioSpectrum 16, offered CD-quality sound via its 16-bit compressor-decompressor ("CODEC").

In 1997, Intel created its Audio CODEC standard AC'97, which was superseded in 2004 by Intel High Definition Audio (HD Audio).

== Compression ==
High fidelity audio hardware became inexpensive faster than data storage media, driving the development of compression techniques.

A popular early variant of pulse-code modulation ("PCM") was a compressed version called adaptive differential pulse-code modulation ("ADPCM").

Sound module files (originally Amiga .MOD files) enabled music to be created and shared via compact files and played back with high quality (using four channels, each at half the sampling rate of audio compact discs). Soon after the release of its Pro AudioSpectrum 16, Media Vision included with it a MOD file player and sample music files.

In the late 1990s, the MP3 format emerged, allowing music to be stored in relatively small files by using high compressions rates through a predictive synthesis technique. Modern computer CD-ROM drives allowed the Red Book CD-DA data to be read in digital format (versus earlier drives that merely output analog audio), which allows entire volumes of music to be copied and encoded many times faster than normal playback speed.

== Non-moving storage ==
After the year 2000, strong demand for small portable music players such as Apple's iPods drove competition in component sales, resulting in data storage devices becoming increasingly economical.

== Online music distribution ==
The popularity of high-quality compressed music and the widespread availability of Internet access enabled widespread copyright infringement (most notably through Napster) followed by widespread legitimate sales of music online through the Apple iTunes Music Store, Amazon.com, Walmart.com and others.

== Tapeless recording ==
Until the early 1990s, music was generally recorded and processed by recording studios with the use of analog tape machines, which were essential in recording, editing, mixing and finalizing audio productions. At the beginning of the 1980s, programmable synthesizers and music workstations like the New England Digital Synclavier and the Fairlight CMI appeared, which allowed for parts of a production to be stored digitally within the system's mainframe without the need for audio tape. However, a music production in itself which used such synthesizers usually still involved mixing and editing using analog tape machine equipment.

The first computer applications to offer fully digital tapeless recording, mixing and editing were Cubase and Notator for the Atari ST platform around 1989. In the 1990s, these and similar systems began gaining more ground among recording studios, and as computer processing and storing capacity increased, analog tape equipment was gradually replaced by fully computerized recording, in which every step in the production chain is carried out using software and digital storage.

== See also ==
- Sound card
- Sound chip
