= Yamaha YM2610 =

Sound chip developed by Yamaha

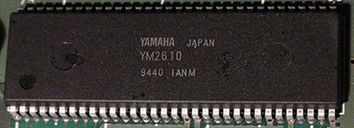
Yamaha YM2610

The YM2610, a.k.a. OPNB, is a sound chip developed by Yamaha. It is a member of Yamaha's OPN family of FM synthesis chips, and related to the YM2608.

The YM2610 was most notably used in SNK's Neo Geo arcade and home video game systems from 1990 along with other arcade game systems, which included Taito's arcade system boards from 1987 such as the Taito Z System, which used a variant of the YM2610 (see below).

The YM2610 has the following features:

- Four concurrent FM synthesis channels (voices)
- Four operators per channel
- Two interval timers
- A low frequency oscillator (LFO)
- Three SSG square wave tone/noise channels: compatible with YM2149
- Seven adaptive differential pulse-code modulation (PCM) channels:
  - ADPCM-A: Six ADPCM channels, fixed pitch, 18.5 kHz sampling rate at 12-bit from 4-bit data
  - ADPCM-B: One ADPCM channel, variable pitch, 2–55.5 kHz sampling rate at 16-bit from 4-bit data

A variant of the YM2610 known as the YM2610B was identical to the YM2610 in every other feature, except that it added two extra FM channels for a total of six. The YM2610 and YM2610B is used in conjunction with a YM3016 stereo DAC.

== See also ==
- VGM – an audio file format for multiple video game platforms, including the SNK Neo Geo
- Yamaha YM2149
- Yamaha YM2203
- Yamaha YM2608
- Yamaha YM2612
