= VGM =

VGM may stand for:

- Video game music, a style of music
- Van Gogh Museum, a museum in Amsterdam named after the famous painter
- VGM (file format), a computer music file format used in old gaming consoles
- Verified Gross Mass (VERMAS or VGM), a SOLAS Convention requirement for container weight as defined by the International Maritime Organisation that transmits container weight information
- Volo's Guide to Monsters, a supplement for the 5th edition Dungeons & Dragons roleplaying game
