= General Instrument AY-3-8910 =

Sound generation IC

AY-3-8910
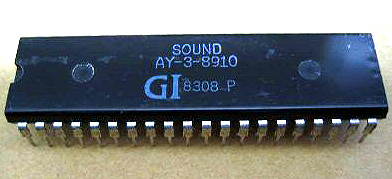
- AY-3-8910 in 40-pin DIP package
- Component type: sound chip
- First produced: 1978

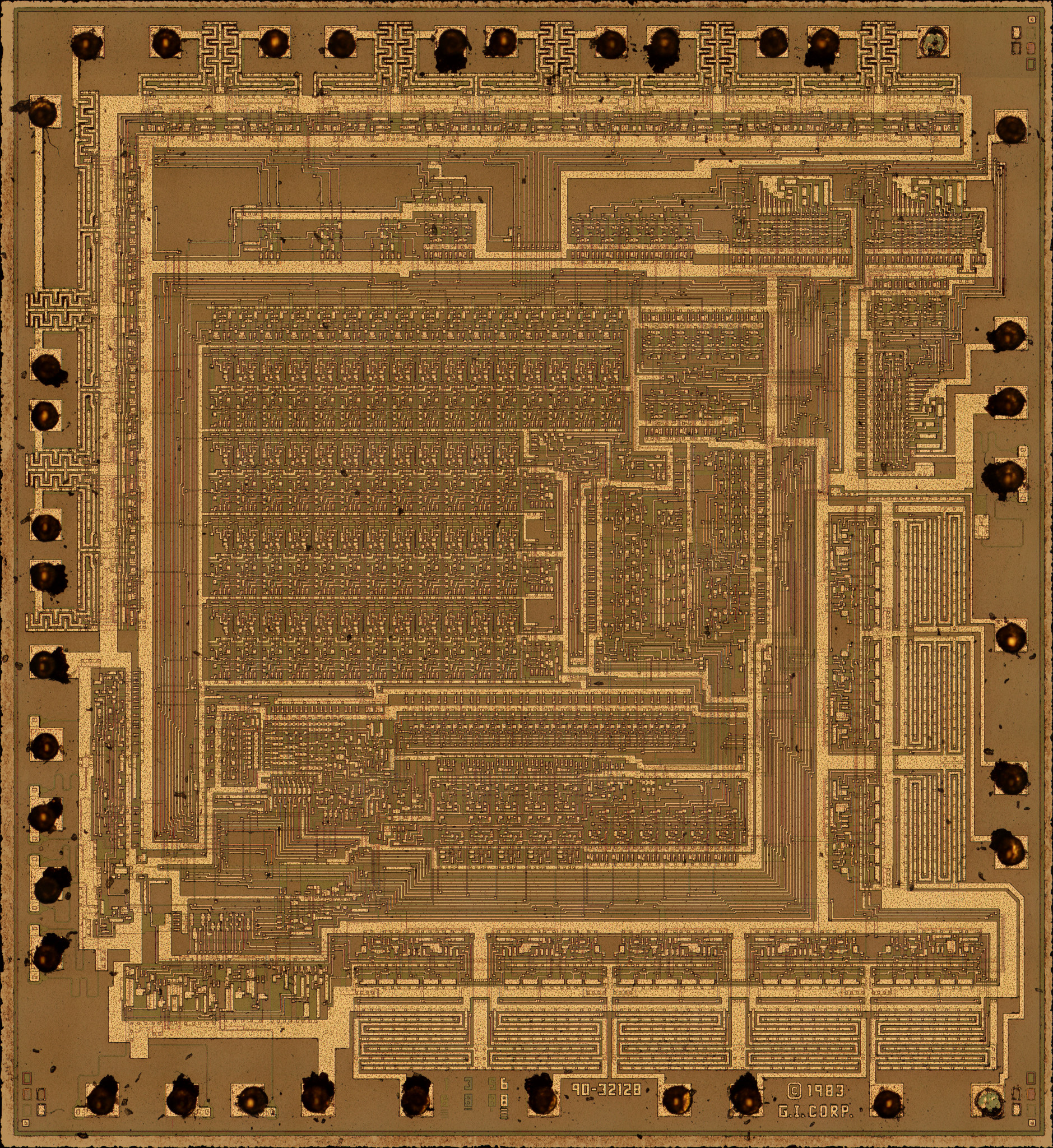
AY-3-8910 die

PSG play demo (noise not used)

The AY-3-8910 is a 3-voice programmable sound generator (PSG) designed by General Instrument (GI) in 1978, initially for use with their 16-bit CP1610 or one of the PIC1650 series of 8-bit microcomputers. It has three channels of sound with a wide frequency response that can produce almost all of the notes on an 88-key piano. These can be modified by a shared envelope generator and random noise channel that can be added to produce sound effects.

The AY-3-8910 and its variants were used in many arcade video games—Konami's Gyruss contains five—and Bally pinball machines as well as being the sound chip in the Intellivision and Vectrex video game consoles, and the Amstrad CPC, Oric-1, Colour Genie, Elektor TV Games Computer, MSX, Tiki 100 and later ZX Spectrum home computers. It was also used in the Mockingboard and Cricket sound cards for the Apple II and the Speech/Sound Cartridge for the TRS-80 Color Computer.

After GI's spinoff of Microchip Technology in 1987, the chip was sold for a few years under the Microchip brand. It was also manufactured under license by Yamaha (with a selectable clock divider pin and a double-resolution and double-rate volume envelope table) as the YM2149F; the Atari ST uses this version. The chips are no longer made, but functionally-identical clones are still in active production. An unofficial VHDL description based on the YM2149 is freely available for use with FPGAs.

== Description ==
=== Bus system ===
The AY-3-8910 is a simple finite-state machine. Its state of sixteen 8-bit registers are programmed over an 8-bit bus, which is used both for addressing and data. Reading or writing requires two cycles. For instance, a typical setup cycle puts the bus into "address mode" and writes the value onto the bus to select a register, and then switches to "data mode" to set the contents of that register. This bus was implemented natively on GI's own CPUs, but it had to be recreated in glue logic or with the help of an additional interface adapter such as the MOS Technology 6522 when the chip was used with the much more common MOS Technology 6502 or Zilog Z80 CPUs.

There are only 16 registers, requiring only four bits of the 8-bit value indicated while in "address mode". In most examples, the four MSB bits of the value must be set to the factory default '0000' value when selecting a register. Incorrectly setting the MSB bits causes the chip to ignore the register change. GI did take orders for customized versions that responded only to MSB values other than '0000'. These allow the same processor to control more than one AY chip on the same bus (e.g. TurboSound for ZX Spectrum), using the MSB values as a chip select. There are many new-old-stock (NOS) chips on the secondary market with MSB bits factory set to a non-'0000' value. The non-'0000' value can cause significant developmental troubles for designers and repair technicians. Software must be written to identify the correct value of the MSB bits on any given chip. Also, software must be changed or hardware added to allow these factory-set-MSB chips to be used in place of the default '0000' chips.

=== Tones ===
The system has three output channels, A, B and C, which are produced by mixing several possible inputs.

Six registers, R0 through R5, control the pitches produced in the three primary tone generators. The frequency to generate is held in two 8-bit registers dedicated to each channel, the fine and coarse tuning registers. Channel A had fine control in R0 and coarse in R1, channel B used R2 and R3, etc. The upper four bits of the coarse registers are unused, leaving twelve bits to produce values from 1 to 4,095 (0 is treated as a 1 for technical reasons). The 12-bit value is used as the frequency divider on the input clock, producing an output tone in the corresponding channel.

The 8910 is capable of running on an input clock of 4 MHz, or 6 MHz with the YM2149F. This allows it to generate tones with fundamental frequencies up to 125 kHz, well beyond human hearing range and into the ultrasonic range. The existence of ultrasonic values is a consequence of the frequency-divider design; in order to have adequate resolution at audible frequencies it is necessary for the overall clock rate (and thus the output at small divisors) to be considerably higher than the audible range. Only divisors below 5 give entirely-ultrasonic output frequencies. Frequencies equivalent to the top octave of a piano keyboard can be defined with reasonable accuracy versus the accepted note values for the even-tempered scale, to nearly 1 Hz precision in the A440 range and even more finely at lower pitches. Despite the high maximum frequency, the ability to divide that figure by 4096 means the lowest directly definable output frequency is 30.6 Hz, roughly equal to B0, the third lowest note on a normal 88-key piano, and as good as subsonic with everyday speaker systems. In essence, the chip is able to produce decently musical output at all reasonable pitches found in most compositions.

By contrast, the competing Texas Instruments SN76489 only has 10 bits of precision for its frequency dividers. Having the same base frequency of 125 kHz, it should in theory lack the two lowest octaves of the 8910. To get around this, the SN76489 plays its tone generators one octave lower than their calculated frequency, giving it one octave less in the bass and one octave less in the top compared to the 8910.

=== Effects ===
R6 is the noise control. The lower five bits are used to store a value between 0 and 31, which defines the period of the noise, and the upper three bits are unused. The input clock is divided by 16 and then by the value in R6 to produce a noise frequency. R7 controls the mixer. Bits 0, 1 and 2 control whether the corresponding tone generator is fed into the output for A, B and C respectively. Bits 3, 4 and 5 control whether the noise generator is output on channels A, B and C respectively. Any given channel can output a pure tone, pure noise, or a mixture of the two. Note that all six of these bits are inverted; output is enabled when the corresponding bit is a zero. Bits 6 and 7 control whether the two I/O ports, IOA and IOB, are set for input (0) or output (1).

R10, R11 and R12 control the volume for the three channels. The four lower bits produce a value from 0 (off) to 15 (loud). Bit 4 controls the "amplitude mode", or M, which causes the output volume to be modulated by the shared envelope generator, ignoring the set 4-bit volume. The upper three bits are unused.

R13 and R14 control the times of the envelope controller, fine and coarse respectively. The input clock is first divided by 16 (or by 8 in the YM2149, because the envelope generator has twice as many steps, and thus needs twice as many clocks to complete a full cycle), and then by the 16-bit value. The final register, R15, controls the shape of the envelope, using the lower four bits. The envelope is simple compared to later designs that included a complete ADSR controller, it controls only whether the envelope starts at zero volume and ramps up to the maximum volume (15), or starts at max volume and ramps down. This is controlled by bit 2, attack, if set to 1 the system ramps upward, and the ramp time itself is controlled by R13 and 14. The other three bits control what happens after this first cycle. If bit 3, continue, is turned on, the volume will reset and ramp again, repeating. If bit 1, alternate, is on, the ramps will alternate up and down, producing a triangle pattern. Finally, bit 0, hold, overrides the other bits, causing the volume to lock at 0 or 15 after the first cycle.

As there is only one envelope shared between all three channels, many programmers ignored it and programmed their own envelope controllers in software (controlling volume directly). A well known trick was to run the hardware envelope at cycle times above 20 Hz and use it to produce sawtooth or triangle-wave like bass sounds.

== Variants ==
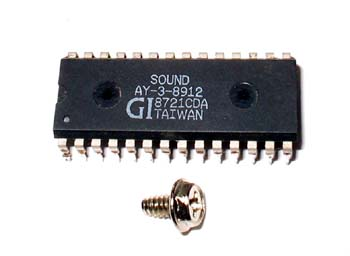
AY-3-8912 chip, 28-pin DIP package with computer case screw for scale

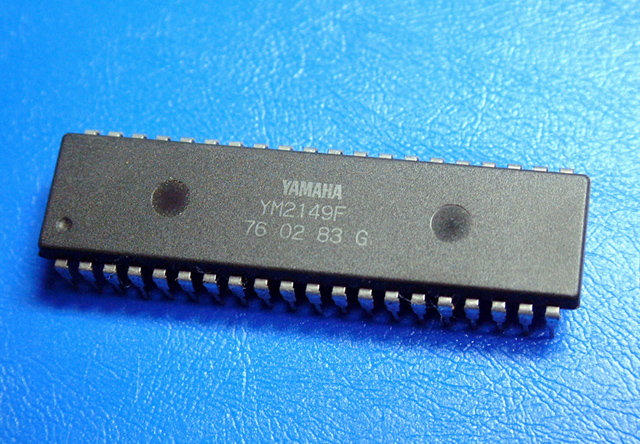
YM2149F chip, 40-pin DIP package

The 8910 silicon chip was sold in three different packages.

The AY-3-8910 has two general-purpose 8-bit parallel I/O ports, A and B, and these are available in the 40-pin package of the same name.

The AY-3-8912 is the same chip in a 28-pin package, with parallel port B simply not connected to any pins. Smaller packages save cost and board space. The 8912 was the most widely used variant.

The AY-3-8913 is the same chip in a 24-pin package, with both parallel ports not connected. Some users thought the small reduction in pin count over the 8912 made it less interesting; however, the I/O registers were rarely used by designers so GI created this fully functional 24 pin alternative and released it approximately 6 months after the 8910 and 8912 chips. The goal was to reduce complexity for the designer and reduce the foot print on the PCB. French Touch member fenarinarsa investigated and documented a problem with the AY-3-8913 chip.

The AY-3-8914 has the same pinout and is in the same 40-pin package as the 8910, except the control registers on the chip are shuffled around, and the 'expected input' on the A9 pin may be different. It was used in Mattel's Intellivision console and Aquarius computer.

The AY-3-8930, also known as AY8930, is an enhanced but mostly-backwards-compatible version of the 8910. The function of the BC2 pin is changed (it is ignored and assumed to be 0 regardless of the pin state), otherwise the pinout is the same as the 8910. This variant of the chip adds a number of major enhancements, such as separate envelopes for the three channels (as opposed to one shared envelope), variable duty-cycles, more bits of precision for note frequency, volume, and envelope frequency, and a much more configurable noise generator. It was used on the Covox Sound Master sound card for the IBM-PC. Very few games took advantage of it beyond the normal 8910 features. This chip may have only been produced by Microchip Technology.

The Yamaha YM2149F SSG (Software-controlled Sound Generator) chip has the same pinout as the AY-3-8910, with the minor difference that pin 26 could halve the master clock if pulled low. If left unconnected, as it would be if replacing an AY-3-8910 chip, an internal resistor pulls the pin high, so the master clock is not halved.

The Yamaha YM3439 is a CMOS version of the YM2149F. It is available in two packages: 40-pin DIP (YM3439-D) and 44-pin QFP (YM3439-F).

The Yamaha YMZ294 is one of the newest variants of the YM2149, but in an 18-pin package. Has no parallel ports and only one sound output with the three channels mixed.

The Yamaha YMZ284 is an even smaller variation of the YM2149, in a 16-pin package. It is basically YMZ294 without the 4/6 MHz selection pin and the /TEST pin.

The Yamaha YMZ285 has a 28-pin package and features a built-in PCM. It has no parallel ports and two sound outputs: one with the three SSG channels mixed, other with the PCM output.

The Toshiba T7766A is a compatible chip that has the same pinout as the AY-3-8910 and was used in some MSX models.

The Winbond WF19054, JFC 95101 and the File KC89C72 have the same pinout as the AY-3-8910 and are also 100% software compatible. They are still in production and are used on many slot machines.

== Related chips ==
Yamaha has used the YM2149 core to produce a whole family of music chips used in mobile phones, home computers, home and arcade video game systems, etc. The OPN series of Yamaha's 4-operator FM synthesis chips are noteworthy for this approach, including the YM2149 core as part of the chip itself. The YM2203 (also known as OPN) was the first chip in the series to include the core of the YM2149, with the envelope generators of the YM2149 located directly on the core. Its far more advanced successors: the YM2608 (also known as OPNA) and the YM2610 (also known as OPNB), also included the YM2149 core and retained all previous features while greatly expanding upon those, with the YM2610 excluding the I/O ports among other minor changes. The YM2612 (also known as OPN2), itself an upgraded derivative of the YM2203, removed the YM2149 portion completely among other changes, including the removal of all YM2149 sound channels and I/O ports, but retained the YM2149's envelope generators located on the chip's core.

== Usage ==
=== Arcade video games ===
- 1942
- Amidar
- Anteater
- Bagman
- Bomb Jack
- BurgerTime
- Dragon's Lair
- Elevator Action
- Frogger
- Gyruss
- Kangaroo
- Karate Champ
- Moon Patrol
- Omega Race
- Pooyan
- Popeye
- Roc'n Rope
- Scramble
- Super Cobra
- Swimmer
- Time Pilot
- Tutankham
- Bally Midway MCR system
  - Discs of Tron
  - Kick
  - Satan's Hollow
  - Spy Hunter
  - Tapper
  - Timber
  - Tron
- DECO Cassette System

=== Home hardware ===
- Amstrad CPC (GI AY-3-8912 / Microchip AY38912/P)
- GX4000 (Microchip AY38912/P)
- Atari ST (Yamaha YM2149F)
- ATM (computer) / Scorpion ZS-256 - post-soviet ZX Spectrum Clones
- CCE MC-1000 (GI AY-3-8910)
- Fujitsu FM-7 (GI AY-3-8910 in all models except FM77AV / Yamaha OPN in FM77AV)
- Colour Genie (GI AY-3-8910)
- Elektor TV Games Computer
- Intellivision (GI AY-3-8914)
- MSX/MSX2 (MSX2 used this and MSX-AUDIO)
- NEC PC-8801 (Yamaha OPN, models PC8801mkII SR models and newer. / Yamaha OPNA, models PC8801 FA and newer.)
- NEC PC-9801 (Yamaha OPN / OPNA (some models), Sound Cards: PC-9801-26, PC-9801-86, Sound Blaster 16 (Optional socket) and others.)
- Oric-1
- Sharp X1 (GI AY-3-8910 / Yamaha YM2149F)
- Sunsoft 5B (YM2149F, used as an extra soundchip in the Famicom game Gimmick!)
- Tiki 100 (GI AY-3-8912)
- Timex Sinclair 2068 (GI AY-3-8912)
- Vectrex (GI AY-3-8912)
- ZX Spectrum 128/+2/+3 (GI AY-3-8912)
- Cricket sound card for Apple II - Echo Plus with two AY-3-8910
- Mockingboard sound card for Apple II
- Mini-Expander for Mattel Aquarius
- Speech/Sound Cartridge for TRS-80 Color Computer
- Electronika BK (as a popular aftermarket addition by enthusiasts and some sellers)
- Samsung SPC-1000

=== Pinball ===
- Flash Gordon
- Frontier
- Hotdoggin'
- Mystic
- Nitro Ground Shaker
- Rolling Stones (Bally)
- Skateball
- Silverball Mania
- Space Invaders
- Viking
- Xenon
- Jeutel French compagny : Papillon, Le King, Olympic games

== See also ==
- VGM – an audio file format for multiple video game platforms
- Texas Instruments SN76477 — a similar design that also saw use, but was not as popular as the AY-3-8910
