= Yamaha YM2203 =

Sound chip

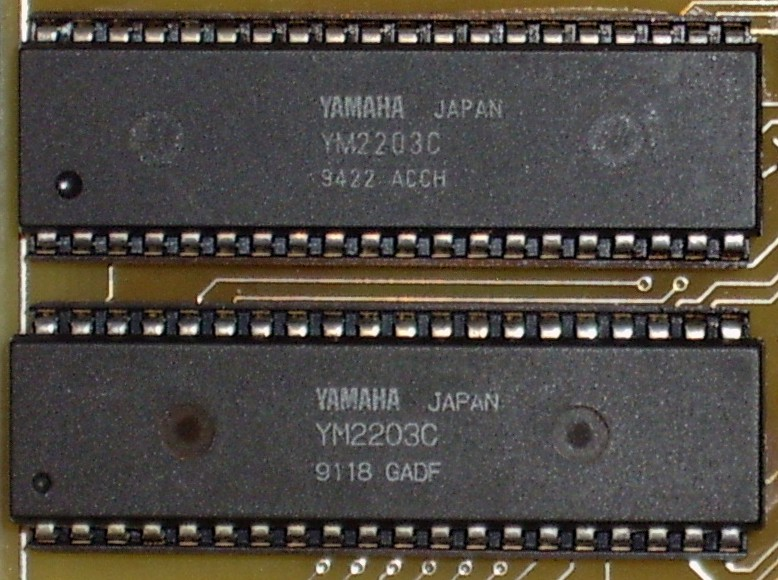
Yamaha YM2203 (two chips)

YM2203 play demo

The YM2203, a.k.a. OPN (FM Operator Type-N), is a six-channel (3 FM and 3 SSG) sound chip developed by Yamaha. It was the progenitor of Yamaha's OPN family of FM synthesis chips used in many video game and computer systems throughout the 1980s and early 1990s. It was used in a variety of NEC computers, along with various arcade game machines.

The YM2203 has the following features:

- Three concurrent FM synthesis channels (voices)
- Four operators per channel
- Two interval timers
- For channel three, operator frequencies can be set independently, making dissonant harmonics possible (Normally, they would have a simple relation like e.g. 2× or 3× relative to a common base frequency). This would be shared across multiple chips in the OPN series.
- Internal implementation of Yamaha's YM2149F SSG chip

The YM2203 and the rest of the OPN synthesizer family generate sound via frequency-modulated digital sine waves. It included 12 operator "cells", each generating a 13-bit sine wave at a programmable frequency, the volume of which is controlled by a programmable ADSR envelope generator. The output of these cells could be either summed together by the mixer, or fed into the input of another cell, in 4-cell batches creating the final sound values or "channels". 4 operator cells per channel allowed a total of 8 different permutations of cell connections, known as "algorithms". The ADSR parameters, multiplier and detune settings for each operator, combined with the algorithm, make up what are known as instrument patches.

The resulting digital sound output of each channel through the mixer was then converted to analog sound via a digital-to-analog converter (DAC). The YM2203 is used with a YM3014 external DAC companion chip.

The SSG module implemented the YM2149F's three SSG channels, noise generator and dual GPIO ports.

== Usage ==
Several arcade games used the YM2203:

- 1943
- Black Tiger
- Bomb Jack
- Bubble Bobble
- Capcom Bowling
- Commando
- Darius
- Enduro Racer
- Ghosts 'n Goblins
- Gun.Smoke
- Hang-On
- Hyper Dyne Side Arms
- Legendary Wings
- Space Harrier
- The Legend of Kage
- The Speed Rumbler

The YM2203 was also used in certain models of the Fujitsu FM-7, NEC PC-8801, and NEC PC-9801 personal computers. It was also used in the Elka EK 44 synthesizer.

== See also ==
- VGM – an audio file format for multiple video game platforms
- Yamaha YM2149
- Yamaha YM2608, aka OPNA
- Yamaha YM2610, aka OPNB
- Yamaha YM2612, aka OPN2
