= Video game music =

Music accompanying video games

Video game music (VGM) is the soundtrack that accompanies video games. Early video game music was once limited to sounds of early sound chips, such as programmable sound generators (PSG) or FM synthesis chips. These limitations have led to the style of music known as chiptune, which became the sound of the early video games.

With technological advances, video game music has grown to include a wider range of sounds. Players can hear music in video games over a game's title screen, menus, and gameplay. Game soundtracks can also change depending on a player's actions or situation, such as indicating missed actions in rhythm games, informing the player they are in a dangerous situation, or rewarding them for specific achievements.

Video game music can be one of two kinds: original or licensed.

The popularity of video game music has created education and job opportunities, generated awards, and led video game soundtracks to be commercially sold and performed in concerts.

== History ==
=== Early video game technology and computer chip music ===
At the time video games had emerged as a popular form of entertainment in the late 1970s, music was stored on physical media in analog waveforms such as cassette tapes and phonograph records. Such components were expensive and prone to breakage under heavy use, making them less than ideal for use in an arcade cabinet, though in rare cases such as Journey, they were used. A more affordable method of having music in a video game was to use digital means, where a specific computer chip would change electrical impulses from computer code into analog sound waves on the fly for output on a speaker. Sound effects for the games were also generated in this fashion.

While this allowed for the inclusion of music in early arcade video games, it was usually monophonic, looped or used sparingly between stages or at the start of a new game, such as the Namco titles Pac-Man (1980) composed by Toshio Kai or Pole Position (1982) composed by Nobuyuki Ohnogi. The first such game to use a continuous background soundtrack was Tomohiro Nishikado's Space Invaders, released by Taito in 1978. It had four descending chromatic bass notes repeating in a loop, though it was dynamic and interacted with the player, increasing pace as the enemies descended on the player. The first video game to feature continuous, melodic background music was Rally-X, released by Namco in 1980, featuring a simple tune that repeats continuously during gameplay. The decision to include any music into a video game meant that at some point it would have to be transcribed into computer code. Some music was original, some was public domain music such as folk songs. Sound capabilities were limited; the popular Atari 2600 home system, for example, was capable of generating only two tones at a time.

As advances were made in silicon technology and costs fell, a definitively new generation of arcade machines and home consoles allowed for great changes in accompanying music. In arcades, machines based on the Motorola 68000 CPU and accompanying various Yamaha YM programmable sound generator sound chips allowed for several more tones or "channels" of sound, sometimes eight or more. The earliest known example of this was Sega's 1980 arcade game Carnival, which used an AY-3-8910 chip to create an electronic rendition of the classical 1889 composition "Over The Waves" by Juventino Rosas.

Konami's 1981 arcade game Frogger introduced a dynamic approach to video game music, using at least eleven different gameplay tracks, in addition to level-starting and game over themes, which change according to the player's actions. This was further improved upon by Namco's 1982 arcade game Dig Dug, where the music stopped when the player stopped moving. Dig Dug was composed by Yuriko Keino, who also composed the music for other Namco games such as Xevious (1982) and Phozon (1983). Sega's 1982 arcade game Super Locomotive featured a chiptune rendition of Yellow Magic Orchestra's "Rydeen" (1979); several later computer games also covered the song, such as Trooper Truck (1983) by Rabbit Software as well as Daley Thompson's Decathlon (1984) and Stryker's Run (1986) composed by Martin Galway.

Home console systems also had a comparable upgrade in sound ability beginning with the ColecoVision in 1982 capable of four channels. However, more notable was the Japanese release of the Famicom in 1983 which was later released in the US as the Nintendo Entertainment System in 1985. It was capable of five channels, one being capable of simple PCM sampled sound. The home computer Commodore 64 released in 1982 was capable of early forms of filtering effects, different types of waveforms and eventually the undocumented ability to play 4-bit samples on a pseudo fourth sound channel. Its comparatively low cost made it a popular alternative to other home computers, as well as its ability to use a TV for an affordable display monitor.

Early games used simple tone generation and/or frequency modulation synthesis to simulate instruments for melodies, and used a "noise channel" for simulating percussive noises. PCM samples were limited to short sound bites (Monopoly), used in place of percussion sounds (Super Mario Bros. 3) or used for basslines (Gimmick!). Home consoles often shared music channels with sound effects. For example, a spaceship's 1400 Hz square wave laser beam sound effect would interrupt any music on that channel.

The mid-to-late 1980s software releases for these platforms had music developed by more people with greater musical experience than before. Quality of composition improved noticeably, and evidence of the popularity of the music of this time period remains even today. Composers who made a name for themselves with their software include Koichi Sugiyama (Dragon Quest), Nobuo Uematsu (Final Fantasy), Rob Hubbard (Monty on the Run, International Karate), Koji Kondo (Super Mario Bros., The Legend of Zelda), Miki Higashino (Gradius, Yie Ar Kung-Fu, Teenage Mutant Ninja Turtles), Hiroshi Kawaguchi (Space Harrier, Hang-On, Out Run), Hirokazu Tanaka (Metroid, Kid Icarus, EarthBound), Martin Galway (Daley Thompson's Decathlon, Stryker's Run, Times of Lore), David Wise (Donkey Kong Country), Yuzo Koshiro (Dragon Slayer, Ys, Shinobi, ActRaiser, Streets of Rage), Mieko Ishikawa (Dragon Slayer, Ys), and Ryu Umemoto (visual novels, shoot 'em ups). By the late 1980s, video game music was being sold as cassette tape soundtracks in Japan, inspiring American companies such as Sierra, Cinemaware and Interplay to give more serious attention to video game music by 1988. The Golden Joystick Awards introduced a category for Best Soundtrack of the Year in 1986, won by Sanxion.

Some games for cartridge systems have been sold with extra audio hardware on board, including Pitfall II for the Atari 2600 and several late Famicom titles. These chips add to the existing sound capabilities.

=== Early digital synthesis and sampling ===
From around 1980, some arcade games began taking steps toward digitized, or sampled, sounds. Namco's 1980 arcade game Rally-X was the first known game to use a digital-to-analog converter (DAC) to produce sampled tones instead of a tone generator. That same year, the first known video game to feature speech synthesis was also released: Sunsoft's shoot 'em up game Stratovox. Around the same time, the introduction of frequency modulation synthesis (FM synthesis), first commercially released by Yamaha for their digital synthesizers and FM sound chips, allowed the tones to be manipulated to have different sound characteristics, where before the tone generated by the chip was limited to the design of the chip itself. Konami's 1983 arcade game Gyruss used five square wave sound chips along with a DAC, which were used to create an electronic version of J. S. Bach's Toccata and Fugue in D minor.

Beyond arcade games, significant improvements to personal computer game music were made possible with the introduction of digital FM synth boards, which Yamaha released for Japanese computers such as the NEC PC-8801 and PC-9801 in the early 1980s, and by the mid-1980s, the PC-8801 and FM-7 had built-in FM sound. The sound FM synth boards produced are described as "warm and pleasant sound". Musicians such as Yuzo Koshiro and Takeshi Abo utilized to produce music that is still highly regarded within the chiptune community. The widespread adoption of FM synthesis by consoles would later be one of the major advances of the 16-bit era, by which time 16-bit arcade machines were using multiple FM synthesis chips.

One of the earliest home computers to make use of digital signal processing in the form of sampling was the Amiga in 1985. The computer's sound chip featured four independent 8-bit digital-to-analog converters. Developers could use this platform to take samples of a music performance, sometimes just a single note long, and play it back through the computer's sound chip from memory. This differed from Rally-X in that its hardware DAC was used to play back simple waveform samples, and a sampled sound allowed for a complexity and authenticity of a real instrument that an FM simulation could not offer. For its role in being one of the first and affordable, the Amiga would remain a staple tool of early sequenced music composing, especially in Europe.

The Macintosh and Amiga home computers offered these features before most others. The Atari ST, the Amiga's main rival, used a Yamaha YM2149 Programmable Sound Generator (PSG); but, compared to Amiga's proprietary sound engine, Atari's PSG could handle only one channel of sound and needed the computer's CPU to process data. This was impractical until the 1989 release of the Atari STE, which used DMA techniques to play back PCM samples at up to 50 kHz. The ST remained relevant, however; equipped with a MIDI controller and external ports, it became the choice for many professional musicians as a MIDI programming device.

IBM PC clones in 1985 would not see any significant development in multimedia abilities for a few more years, and sampling would not become popular in other video game systems for several years. Though sampling had the potential to produce much more realistic sounds, each sample required much more data in memory. This was at a time when all memory, solid-state (ROM cartridge), magnetic (floppy disk) or otherwise was still very costly per kilobyte. Sequenced sound chip-generated music, on the other hand, was generated with a few lines of comparatively simple code and took up far less precious memory.

Arcade systems pushed game music forward in 1984 with the introduction of FM (Frequency Modulation) synthesis, providing more organic sounds than previous PSGs. The first such game, Marble Madness used the Yamaha YM2151 FM synthesis chip.

As home consoles moved into the fourth generation, or 16-bit era, the hybrid approach (sampled and tone) to music composing continued to be used. The Sega Genesis offered advanced graphics over the NES and improved sound synthesis features (also using a Yamaha chip, the YM2612), but largely held the same approach to sound design. 6 channels of FM along with 4 PSG channels add up to ten channels in total for tone generation, with the 6th FM channel swappable for PCM samples were available in stereo instead of the NES's five channels in mono, one for PCM. As before, it was often used for percussion samples. The Genesis did not support 16-bit sampled sounds. Despite the additional tone channels, writing music still posed a challenge to traditional composers and it forced much more imaginative use of the FM synthesizer to create an enjoyable listening experience. The composer Yuzo Koshiro utilized the Genesis hardware effectively to produce "progressive, catchy, techno-style compositions far more advanced than what players were used to" for games such as The Revenge of Shinobi (1989) and the Streets of Rage series, setting a "new high watermark for what music in games could sound like." The soundtrack for Streets of Rage 2 (1992) in particular is considered "revolutionary" and "ahead of its time" for its blend of house music with "dirty" electro basslines and "trancey electronic textures" that "would feel as comfortable in a nightclub as a video game." Another important FM synth composer was Ryu Umemoto, who composed music for many visual novels and shoot 'em ups for PCs during the 1990s.

As the cost of magnetic memory declined in the form of diskettes, the evolution of video game music on the Amiga, and some years later game music development in general, shifted to sampling in some form. It took some years before Amiga game designers learned to wholly use digitized sound effects in music (an early exception case was the title music of text adventure game The Pawn, 1986). By this time, computer and game music had already begun to form its own identity, and thus many music makers intentionally tried to produce music that sounded like that heard on the Commodore 64 and NES, which resulted in the chiptune genre.

The release of a freely-distributed Amiga program named Soundtracker by Karsten Obarski in 1987 started the era of MOD-format which made it easy for anyone to produce music based on digitized samples. Module files were made with programs called "trackers" after Obarski's Soundtracker. This MOD/tracker tradition continued with PC computers in the 1990s. Examples of Amiga games using digitized instrument samples include David Whittaker's soundtrack for Shadow of the Beast, Chris Hülsbeck's soundtrack for Turrican 2 and Matt Furniss's tunes for Laser Squad. Richard Joseph also composed some theme songs featuring vocals and lyrics for games by Sensible Software most famous being Cannon Fodder (1993) with a song "War Has Never Been So Much Fun" and Sensible World of Soccer (1994) with a song "Goal Scoring Superstar Hero". These songs used long vocal samples.

A similar approach to sound and music developments had become common in the arcades by this time and had been used in many arcade system boards since the mid-1980s. This was further popularized in the early 1990s by games like Street Fighter II (1991) on the CPS-1, which used voice samples extensively along with sampled sound effects and percussion. Neo Geo's MVS system also carried powerful sound development which often included surround sound.

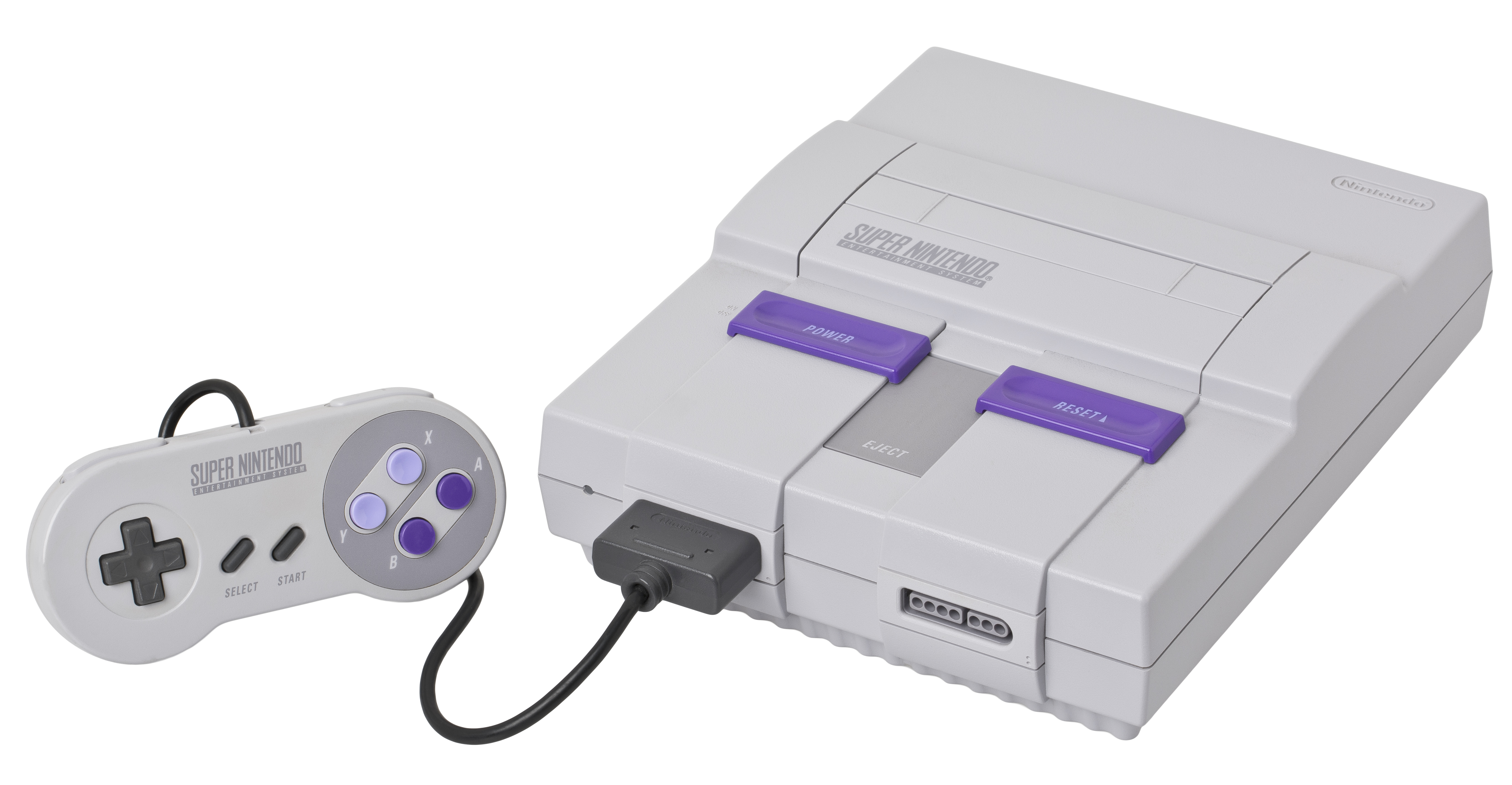
The Super NES (1991) brought digitized sound to console games.

The evolution also carried into home console video games, such as the release of the Super Famicom in 1990, and its US/EU version Super NES in 1991. It sported a specialized custom Sony chip for both the sound generation and for special hardware DSP. It was capable of eight channels of sampled sounds at up to 16-bit resolution, had a wide selection of DSP effects, including a type of ADSR usually seen in high-end synthesizers of the time, and full stereo sound. This allowed experimentation with applied acoustics in video games, such as musical acoustics (early games like Super Castlevania IV, F-Zero, Final Fantasy IV, Gradius III, and later games like Chrono Trigger), directional (Star Fox) and spatial acoustics (Dolby Pro Logic was used in some games, like King Arthur's World and Jurassic Park), as well as environmental and architectural acoustics (A Link to the Past, Secret of Evermore). Many games also made heavy use of the high-quality sample playback capabilities (Super Star Wars, Tales of Phantasia). The only real limitation to this powerful setup was the still-costly solid state memory. Other consoles of the generation could boast similar abilities yet did not have the same circulation levels as the Super NES. The Neo Geo home system was capable of the same powerful sample processing as its arcade counterpart but was several times the cost of a Super NES. The Sega CD (the Mega CD outside North America) hardware upgrade to the Mega Drive (Genesis in the US) offered multiple PCM channels, but they were often passed over instead to use its capabilities with the CD-ROM itself.

The popularity of the Super NES and its software remained limited to regions where NTSC television was the broadcast standard. Partly because of the difference in frame rates of PAL broadcast equipment, many titles released were never redesigned to play appropriately and ran much slower than had been intended, or were never released. This showed a divergence in popular video game music between PAL and NTSC countries that still shows to this day. This divergence would be lessened as the fifth generation of home consoles launched globally, and as Commodore began to take a back seat to general-purpose PCs and Macs for developing and gaming.

Though the Mega CD/Sega CD, and to a greater extent the PC Engine in Japan, would give gamers a preview of the direction video game music would take in streaming music, the use of both sampled and sequenced music continues in game consoles even today. The huge data storage benefit of optical media would be coupled with progressively more powerful audio generation hardware and higher quality samples in the Fifth Generation. In 1994, the CD-ROM equipped PlayStation supported 24 channels of 16-bit samples of up to 44.1 kHz sample rate, samples equal to CD audio in quality. It also sported a few hardware DSP effects like reverb. Many Square titles continued to use sequenced music, such as Final Fantasy VII, Legend of Mana, and Final Fantasy Tactics. The Sega Saturn also with a CD drive supported 32 channels of PCM at the same resolution as the original PlayStation. In 1996, the Nintendo 64, still using a solid-state cartridge, actually supported an integrated and scalable sound system that was potentially capable of 100 channels of PCM, and an improved sample rate of 48 kHz. Games for the N64, because of the cost of the solid-state memory, typically had samples of lesser quality than the other two, however, and music tended to be simpler in construct.

The more dominant approach for games based on CDs, however, was shifting toward streaming audio.

=== MIDI on the PC ===
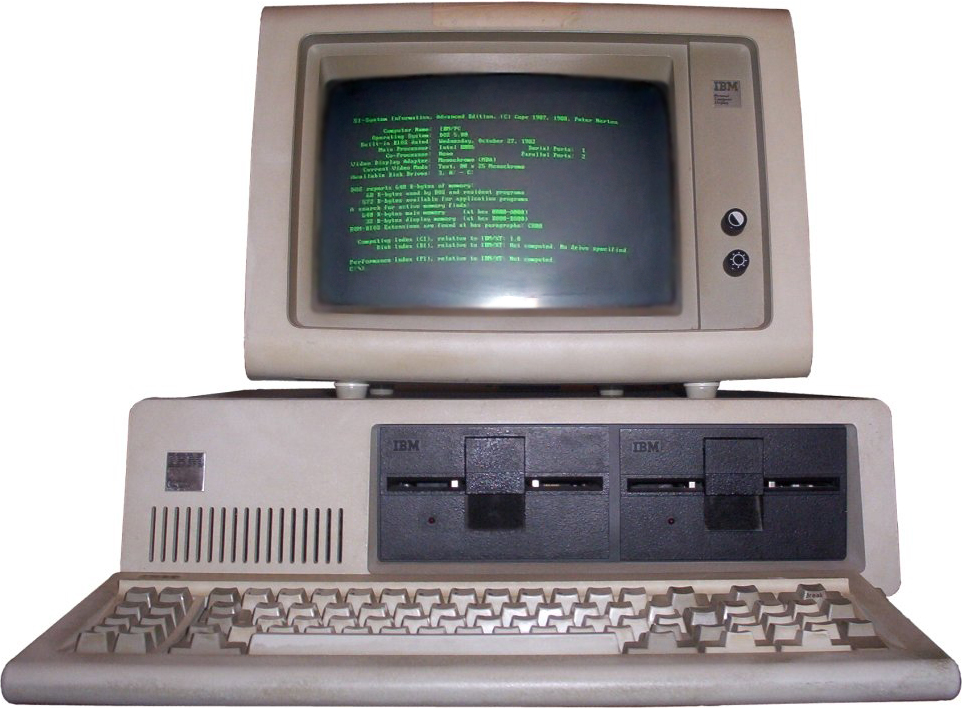
The first developers of IBM PC computers neglected audio capabilities (first IBM model, 1981).

A music track from 3D Movie Maker made using General MIDI

In the same timeframe of the late 1980s to mid-1990s, the IBM PC clones using the x86 architecture became more ubiquitous, yet had a very different path in sound design than other PCs and consoles. Early PC gaming was limited to the PC speaker, and some proprietary standards such as the IBM PCjr 3-voice chip. While sampled sound could be achieved on the PC speaker using pulse width modulation, doing so required a significant proportion of the available processor power, rendering its use in games rare.

With the increase of x86 PCs in the market, there was a vacuum in sound performance in home computing that expansion cards attempted to fill. The first two recognizable standards were the Roland MT-32, followed by the AdLib sound card. Roland's solution was driven by MIDI sequencing using advanced LA synthesizers. This made it the first choice for game developers to produce upon, but its higher cost as an end-user solution made it prohibitive. The AdLib used a low-cost FM synthesis chip from Yamaha, and many boards could operate compatibly using the MIDI standard.

The AdLib card was usurped in 1989 by Creative's Sound Blaster, which used the same Yamaha FM chip in the AdLib, for compatibility, but also added 8-bit 22.05 kHz (later 44.1 kHz) digital audio recording and playback of a single stereo channel. As an affordable end-user product, the Sound Blaster constituted the core sound technology of the early 1990s; a combination of a simple FM engine that supported MIDI, and a DAC engine of one or more streams. Only a minority of developers ever used Amiga-style tracker formats in commercial PC games, (Unreal) typically preferring to use the MT-32 or AdLib/SB-compatible devices. As general purpose PCs using x86 became more ubiquitous than the other PC platforms, developers drew their focus towards that platform.

The last major development before streaming music came in 1992: Roland Corporation released the first General MIDI card, the sample-based SCC-1, an add-in card version of the SC-55 desktop MIDI module. The comparative quality of the samples spurred similar offerings from Soundblaster, but costs for both products were still high. Both companies offered 'daughterboards' with sample-based synthesizers that could be later added to a less expensive soundcard (which only had a DAC and a MIDI controller) to give it the features of a fully integrated card.

Unlike the standards of Amiga or Atari, a PC using x86 even then could be using a broad mix of hardware. Developers increasingly used MIDI sequences: instead of writing soundtrack data for each type of soundcard, they generally wrote a fully featured data set for the Roland application that would be compatible with lesser featured equipment so long as it had a MIDI controller to run the sequence. However, different products used different sounds attached to their MIDI controllers. Some tied into the Yamaha FM chip to simulate instruments, some daughterboards of samples had very different sound qualities; meaning that no single sequence performance would be accurate to every other General MIDI device.

All of these considerations in the products reflected the high cost of memory storage which rapidly declined with the optical CD format.

=== Pre-recorded and streaming music ===
Taking entirely pre-recorded music had many advantages over sequencing for sound quality. Music could be produced freely with any kind and number of instruments, allowing developers to simply record one track to be played back during the game. Quality was only limited by the effort put into mastering the track itself. Memory space costs that was previously a concern was somewhat addressed with optical media becoming the dominant media for software games. CD quality audio allowed for music and voice that had the potential to be truly indistinguishable from any other source or genre of music.

In fourth generation home video games and PCs this was limited to playing a Mixed Mode CD audio track from a CD while the game was in play (such as Sonic CD). The earliest examples of Mixed Mode CD audio in video games include the TurboGrafx-CD RPG franchises Tengai Makyō, composed by Ryuichi Sakamoto from 1989, and the Ys series, composed by Yuzo Koshiro and Mieko Ishikawa and arranged by Ryo Yonemitsu in 1989. The Ys soundtracks, particularly Ys I & II (1989), are still regarded as some of the most influential video game music ever composed.

However, there were several disadvantages of regular CD-audio. Optical drive technology was still limited in spindle speed, so playing an audio track from the game CD meant that the system could not access data again until it stopped the track from playing. Looping, the most common form of game music, was also a problem as when the laser reached the end of a track, it had to move itself back to the beginning to start reading again causing an audible gap in playback.

To address these drawbacks, some PC game developers designed their own container formats in house, for each application in some cases, to stream compressed audio. This would cut back on memory used for music on the CD, allowed for much lower latency and seek time when finding and starting to play music, and also allowed for much smoother looping due to being able to buffer the data. A minor drawback was that use of compressed audio meant it had to be decompressed which put load on the CPU of a system. As computing power increased, this load became minimal, and in some cases, dedicated chips in a computer (such as a sound card) would actually handle all the decompressing.

Fifth generation home console systems also developed specialised streaming formats and containers for compressed audio playback. Games would take full advantage of this ability, sometimes with highly praised results (Castlevania: Symphony of the Night). Games ported from arcade machines, which continued to use FM synthesis, often saw superior pre-recorded music streams on their home console counterparts (Street Fighter Alpha 2). Even though the game systems were capable of "CD quality" sound, these compressed audio tracks were not true "CD quality." Many of them had lower sampling rates, but not so significant that most consumers would notice. Using a compressed stream allowed game designers to play back streamed music and still be able to access other data on the disc without interruption of the music, at the cost of CPU power used to render the audio stream. Manipulating the stream any further would require a far more significant level of CPU power available in the 5th generation.

Some games, such as the Wipeout series, continued to use full Mixed Mode CD audio for their soundtracks.

This overall freedom offered to music composers gave video game music the equal footing with other popular music it had lacked. A musician could now, with no need to learn about programming or the game architecture itself, independently produce the music to their satisfaction. This flexibility would be exercised as popular mainstream musicians would be using their talents for video games specifically. An early example is Way of the Warrior on the 3DO, with music by White Zombie. A more well-known example is Trent Reznor's score for Quake.

An alternate approach, as with the TMNT arcade, was to take pre-existing music not written exclusively for the game and use it in the game. The game Star Wars: X-Wing vs. TIE Fighter and subsequent Star Wars games took music composed by John Williams for the Star Wars films of the 1970s and 1980s and used it for the game soundtracks.

Both using new music streams made specifically for the game, and using previously released/recorded music streams are common approaches for developing sound tracks to this day. It is common for X-games sports-based video games to come with some popular artists recent releases (SSX, Tony Hawk, Initial D), as well as any game with heavy cultural demographic theme that has tie-in to music (Need For Speed: Underground, Gran Turismo, and Grand Theft Auto). Sometimes a hybrid of the two are used, such as in Dance Dance Revolution.

Many sports game series like Madden NFL, NBA 2K, and FIFA use popular and underground songs in their soundtrack to give their menus atmosphere. The phrase "FIFA song" has become popular in recent years, it describes a song (often not American) that is upbeat and has lots of rhythm. The inclusion on the FIFA soundtrack has given many artists exposure that helped launch their music careers.

Sequencing samples continue to be used in modern gaming where fully recorded audio is not viable. Until the mid-2000s, many larger games on home consoles used sequenced audio to save space. Additionally, most games on the Game Boy Advance and Nintendo DS used sequenced music due to storage limitations. Sometimes a cross between sequencing samples, and streaming music is used. Games such as Republic: The Revolution (music composed by James Hannigan) and Command & Conquer: Generals (music composed by Bill Brown) have utilised sophisticated systems governing the flow of incidental music by stringing together short phrases based on the action on screen and the player's most recent choices (see dynamic music). Other games dynamically mixed the sound on the game based on cues of the game environment.

As processing power increased dramatically in the 6th generation of home consoles, it became possible to apply special effects in realtime to streamed audio. In SSX, if a snowboarder takes to the air after jumping from a ramp, the music softens or muffles a bit, and the ambient noise of wind and air blowing becomes louder to emphasize being airborne. When the snowboarder lands, the music resumes regular playback until its next "cue". The LucasArts company pioneered this interactive music technique with their iMUSE system, used in their early adventure games and the Star Wars flight simulators Star Wars: X-Wing and Star Wars: TIE Fighter. Action games such as these will change dynamically to match the amount of danger. Stealth-based games will sometimes rely on such music, either by handling streams differently, or dynamically changing the composition of a sequenced soundtrack.

=== Personalized soundtracks ===
Being able to play one's own music during a game in the past usually meant turning down the game audio and using an alternative music player. Some early exceptions were possible on PC/Windows gaming in which it was possible to independently adjust game audio while playing music with a separate program running in the background. Some PC games, such as Quake, play music from the CD while retrieving game data exclusively from the hard disk, thereby allowing the game CD to be swapped for any music CD. The first PC game to introduce in-game support for custom soundtracks was Lionhead Studio's Black & White. The 2001 game included an in-game interface for Winamp that enabled the players to play audio tracks from their own playlists. In addition, this would sometimes trigger various reactions from the player's Creature, like dancing or laughing.

Some PlayStation games supported this by swapping the game CD with a music CD, although when the game needed data, players had to swap the CDs again. One of the earliest games, Ridge Racer, was loaded entirely into RAM, letting the player insert a music CD to provide a soundtrack throughout the entirety of the gameplay. In Vib Ribbon, this became a gameplay feature, with the game generating levels based entirely on the music on whatever CD the player inserted.

Microsoft's Xbox allowed music to be copied from a CD onto its internal hard drive, to be used as a "Custom Soundtrack", if enabled by the game developer. The feature carried over into the Xbox 360 where it became supported by the system software and could be enabled at any point. The Wii is also able to play custom soundtracks if it is enabled by the game (Excite Truck, Endless Ocean). The PlayStation Portable can, in games like Need for Speed Carbon: Own the City and FIFA 08, play music from a Memory Stick.

The PlayStation 3 has the ability to utilize custom soundtracks in games using music saved on the hard drive, however few game developers used this function. MLB 08: The Show, released in 2008, has a My MLB sound track feature that allows the user to play music tracks of their choice saved on the hard drive of their PS3, rather than the preprogrammed tracks incorporated into the game by the developer. An update to Wipeout HD, released on the PlayStation Network, was made to also incorporate this feature.

In the video game Audiosurf, custom soundtracks are the main aspect of the game. Users have to pick a music file to be analyzed. The game will generate a race track based on tempo, pitch and complexity of the sound. The user will then race on this track, synchronized with the music.

Games in the Grand Theft Auto series have supported custom soundtracks, using them as a separate in-game radio station. The feature was primarily exclusive to PC versions, and was adopted to a limited degree on console platforms. On a PC, inserting custom music into the stations is done by placing music files into a designated folder. For the Xbox version, a CD must be installed into the console's hard drive. For the iPhone version of Grand Theft Auto: Chinatown Wars, players create an iTunes playlist which is then played by the game.

Forza Horizon 3 used a similar technology of custom soundtracks with the help of Groove Music.

=== Developments in the 2000s ===
Battle for Wesnoth (2005) – ambient music
A track of ambient music from The Battle for Wesnoth (2005).

Battle for Wesnoth (2005) – fanfare music
An example of fanfare music in video games, also from The Battle for Wesnoth (2005).

The Xbox 360 supports Dolby Digital software, sampling and playback rate of 16-bit @ 48 kHz (internal; with 24-bit hardware D/A converters), hardware codec streaming, and potential of 256 audio simultaneous channels. PCs continue to rely on third-party devices for in-game sound reproduction, and SoundBlaster is largely the only major player in the entertainment audio expansion card business.

The PlayStation 3 handles multiple types of surround sound technology, including Dolby TrueHD and DTS-HD Master Audio, with up to 7.1 channels, and with sampling rates of up to 192 kHz.

Nintendo's Wii console shares many audio components with the GameCube from the previous generation, including Dolby Pro Logic II. These features are extensions of technology already currently in use.

== Impact and importance ==
Many video game players believe that music can enhance game play and outlets such as Popular Science have stated that it is designed to "simultaneously stimulate your senses and blend into the background of your brain, because that's the point of the soundtrack. It has to engage you, the player, in a task without distracting from it. In fact, the best music would actually direct the listener to the task."

Sound effects within game play are also believed to impact game performance. Ambient sounds such as those present in Resident Evil are seen to enhance the tension felt by players, something that GameSpot stated was also used in cinema. Speeding up the sound effects and music in games such as Space Invaders is also stated to have a strong impact on the gaming experience when done properly. Properly done, this can help create realism within virtuality and alert players to important scenes and information.

Music and sound effects can become memorable, enabling people to instantly recognize music or sound effects as well as hum or mimic the tune or sound effect. Polygon has stated that despite the popularity of video game music, people may not always know the name of the composer.

== Licensing ==
Using licensed music for video games became more popular as the medium used to distribute games grew large enough to accommodate songs alongside a game's other assets. Additionally, with the large growth of the video game market in the 2000s, song licensing became a lucrative route for music rights holders to gain part of that revenue. Games like those in the Grand Theft Auto series became showcases of licensed music. Music licensing is generally complicated due to various copyright laws, typically with at least two separate copyrights to consider: the underlying composition's and the sound recording's. Most large video game developers and publishers who use licensed music typically have staff proficient in licensing to clear songs for use in video games with the various music labels and other creative persons.

Games with licensed music can have problems well past release if perpetual rights for the music are not secured for the game. Early games before the onset of digital distribution would have perpetual right for the music since there was no practical way to update the game following release at retail to deal with curtailed rights. However, digital distribution platforms, like Steam, Xbox Live, and PlayStation Network keep games up-to-date automatically. Music licenses for games sold through digital distribution may include limited terms, requiring the publisher to re-negotiate rights with the music's owner, or otherwise the music must be removed from the game through these updates. Notably, Alan Wake by Remedy Entertainment, first released in 2010, had to be pulled from digital sale in 2017 due to expiring music rights. However, with Microsoft's help, Remedy was able to re-secure these rights a year later and returned the game for sale. Alpha Protocol by Obsidian Entertainment was also pulled from sale in 2019 due to expiring music license rights, though there are no known plans if publisher Sega will seek to renew these.

Due to the Digital Millennium Copyright Act, most of the popular video sites use automated forms of detection (like YouTube's Content ID), flagging or blocking content that uses copyrighted music. To help players avoid this problem when streaming videos (see Let's Play), some games offer a "stream-safe" option, either disabling the music or replacing it with copyright-free or royalty-free music.

== Game music as a genre ==
Many games for the Nintendo Entertainment System and other early game consoles feature a similar style of musical composition that is sometimes described as the "video game genre." Some aspects of this style continue to influence certain music today, though gamers do not associate many modern game soundtracks with the older style. The genre's compositional elements largely developed due to technological restraints, while also being influenced by electronic music bands, particularly Yellow Magic Orchestra (YMO), who were popular during the late 1970s to 1980s. YMO sampled sounds from several classic arcade games in their early albums, most notably Space Invaders in the 1978 hit song "Computer Game". In turn, the band would have a major influence on much of the video game music produced during the 8-bit and 16-bit eras.

Features of the video game music genre include:

- Pieces designed to repeat indefinitely, rather than having an arranged ending or fading out.
- Pieces lacking lyrics and playing over gameplay sounds.
- Limited polyphony. Only three notes can be played simultaneously on the Nintendo Entertainment System. A great deal of effort was put into composition to create the illusion of more notes playing at once.

Although the tones featured in NES music can be thought of as emulating a traditional four-piece rock band (triangle wave used as a bass, two pulse waves analogous to two guitars, and a white noise channel used for drums), composers would often go out of their way to compose complex and rapid sequences of notes, in part due to the restrictions mentioned above. This is similar to music composition during the Baroque period, when composers, particularly when creating solo pieces, focused on musical embellishments to compensate for instruments such as the harpsichord that do not allow for expressive dynamics. For the same reason, many early compositions also feature a distinct jazz influence. These would overlap with later influences from heavy metal and J-pop music, resulting in an equally distinct compositional style in the 16-bit era.

In an unrelated but parallel course in the European and North American developer scene, similar limitations were driving the musical style of home computer games. Module file format music, particularly MOD, used similar techniques but was more heavily influenced by the electronic music scene as it developed, and resulted in another very distinct subgenre. Demos and the developing demoscene played a big part in the early years, and still influence video game music today.

As technological limitations gradually lifted, composers were given more freedom and, with the advent of CD-ROM, pre-recorded soundtracks came to dominate, resulting in a noticeable shift in composition and voicing style. Popular early CD-ROM titles were released with high-resolution graphics and recorded music. Since the audio was not reliant on a sound-card's synthesis, CD-ROM technology ensured that composers and sound designers could know what audio would sound like on most consumer configurations and could also record sound effects, live instruments, vocals, and in-game dialogue.

== Outside video games ==
Appreciation for video game music is strong among fans and composers, particularly for music from the third and fourth generations of home video game consoles, and sometimes newer generations. This appreciation has been shown outside the context of a video game, in the form of CDs, sheet music, public performances, art installations, and popular music.

=== CDs and sheet music ===
Selling video game soundtracks separately as CDs has become increasingly popular in the industry. Interpretive albums, remixes, and live performance albums were also common variations to original soundtracks (OSTs).

Koichi Sugiyama was an early figure in this practice, and following the release of the first Dragon Quest game in 1986, a live performance CD of his compositions was released and performed by the Tokyo Strings Ensemble (then later by other groups including the London Philharmonic Orchestra, and Tokyo Metropolitan Symphony Orchestra).

By 1987, Sega were selling 50,000 to 100,000 game soundtrack CDs annually. Yuzo Koshiro, another early figure, released a live performance of the Actraiser soundtrack. Both Koshiro's and fellow Falcom composer Mieko Ishikawa's contributions to Ys music would have such long-lasting impact that there were more albums released of Ys music than of almost all other game-type music.

Like anime soundtracks, these soundtracks and even sheet music books were usually marketed exclusively in Japan. Therefore, interested gamers outside Japan had to import the soundtracks and/or sheet music books through on or offline firms specifically dedicated to video game soundtrack imports. This has been somewhat less of an issue more recently as domestic publishers of anime and video games have been producing western equivalent versions of the OSTs for sale in UK and US, though these are often for more popular titles. Video game music companies like Materia Collective have pursued and produced published book editions of video game music.

The sale of video game soundtracks has created a growing symbiotic relationship between the music industry and the games industry. Commonly, games are being used to promote and sell licensed music, rather than just original score, and recording artists are being used to market and sell games. Music marketing agency Electric Artists conducted a study that revealed a number of interesting statistics surrounding "hard-core gamers" and their music habits: 40% of hard-core gamers bought the CD after hearing a song they liked in a video game, 73% of gamers said soundtracks within games help sell more CDs, and 40% of respondents said a game introduced them to a new band or song, then 27% of them went out and bought what they heard. Some games' soundtracks have become so popular they have reached platinum status, such as NBA Live 2003.

=== Public performance ===
Many original composers have publicly exhibited their music through symphonic concert performances. Once again, Koichi Sugiyama was the first to execute this practice in 1987 with his "Family Classic Concert" featuring live performances of Dragon Quest music and had continued these concert performances almost annually. In 1991, he also formed a series called Orchestral Game Music Concerts, notable for featuring music of other talented game composers such as Yoko Kanno (Nobunaga's Ambition, Romance of the Three Kingdoms, Uncharted Waters), Nobuo Uematsu (Final Fantasy), Keiichi Suzuki (Mother/Earthbound), and Kentaro Haneda (Wizardry).

Following suit, compositions by Nobuo Uematsu on Final Fantasy IV were arranged into Final Fantasy IV: Celtic Moon, a live performance by string musicians with strong Celtic influence recorded in Ireland. The Love Theme from the same game has been used as an instructional piece of music in Japanese schools.

With the success of Square's 1990s games Final Fantasy VI, Final Fantasy VII and Final Fantasy VIII by Nobuo Uematsu, and Chrono Trigger, Xenogears and Chrono Cross by Yasunori Mitsuda, public performance began to gain international popularity. On August 20, 2003, music written for video games such as Final Fantasy and The Legend of Zelda was performed for the first time outside Japan, by the Czech National Symphony Orchestra in a Symphonic Game Music Concert in Leipzig, Germany at the Gewandhaus concert hall. This event was held as the official opening ceremony of Europe's biggest trading fair for video games, the GC Games Convention and repeated in 2004, 2005, 2006 and 2007.

On November 17, 2003, Square Enix launched the Final Fantasy Radio on America Online. The radio station has initially featured complete tracks from Final Fantasy XI and Final Fantasy XI: Rise of Zilart and samplings from Final Fantasy VII through Final Fantasy X.

The first officially sanctioned Final Fantasy concert in the United States was performed by the Los Angeles Philharmonic Orchestra at Walt Disney Concert Hall in Los Angeles, California, on May 10, 2004. All seats at the concert were sold out in a single day. "Dear Friends: Music from Final Fantasy" followed and was performed at various cities across the United States. Nobuo Uematsu has also performed a variety of Final Fantasy compositions live with his rock band, The Black Mages.

On July 6, 2005, the Los Angeles Philharmonic Orchestra also held a Video Games Live concert at the Hollywood Bowl, an event founded by video game music composers Tommy Tallarico and Jack Wall. This concert featured a variety of video game music, ranging from Pong to Halo 2. It also incorporated real-time video feeds that were in sync with the music, as well as laser and light special effects. Media outside the video game industry, such as NPR and The New York Times, have covered their subsequent world tours.

On August 20, 2006, the Malmö Symphonic Orchestra with host Orvar Säfström performed the outdoor game music concert Joystick in Malmö, Sweden before an audience of 17,000, holding the current record of attendance for a game music concert. Säfström has since continued to produce game music concerts around Europe under the names Joystick and Score.

From April 20–27, 2007, Eminence Symphony Orchestra, an orchestra dedicated to video game and anime music, performed the first part of their annual tour, the "A Night in Fantasia" concert series in Australia. Whilst Eminence had performed video game music as part of their concerts since their inception, the 2007 concert marked the first time ever that the entire setlist was pieces from video games. Up to seven of the world's most famous game composers were also in attendance as special guests. Music performed included Red Alert 3 Theme: Soviet March by James Hannigan and Shadow of the Colossus by Kow Otani.

Since 2010, video games-themed "pops" concerts have become a major proportion of the revenue in many United States concert halls, as traditional classical music performances decline in popularity.

On March 16, 2012, the Smithsonian American Art Museum's "The Art of Video Games" exhibit opened featuring a chipmusic soundtrack at the entrance by artists 8 Bit Weapon & ComputeHer. 8 Bit Weapon also created a track called "The art of Video Games Anthem" for the exhibit as well.

The first video game music-focused concert for the BBC Proms was held on August 1, 2022.

BAFTA will launch the BAFTA Games in Concert tour in 2026, featuring music from games that have won BAFTA Game Awards, with Austin Wintory compositing and conducting the live orchestra. Initial tour dates will take place across United Kingdom with plans for international venues later.

=== In popular music ===
In the popular music industry, video game music and sounds have appeared in songs by various popular artists. Arcade game sounds had a particularly strong influence on the hip-hop, pop music (particularly synthpop) and electro music genres during the golden age of arcade video games in the early 1980s. Arcade game sounds had an influence on synthpop pioneers Yellow Magic Orchestra, who sampled Space Invaders sounds in their influential 1978 debut album, particularly the hit song "Computer Game". In turn, the band would have a major influence on much of the video game music produced during the 8-bit and 16-bit eras.

Other pop songs based on Space Invaders soon followed, including "Disco Space Invaders" (1979) by Funny Stuff, "Space Invaders" (1980) by Playback, and the hit songs "Space Invader" (1980) by The Pretenders and "Space Invaders" (1980) by Uncle Vic. Buckner & Garcia produced a successful album dedicated to video game music in 1982, Pac-Man Fever. Former YMO member Haruomi Hosono also released a 1984 album produced entirely from Namco arcade game samples entitled Video Game Music, an early example of a chiptune record and the first video game music album. Warp's record "Testone" (1990) by Sweet Exorcist sampled video game sounds from YMO's "Computer Game" and defined Sheffield's bleep techno scene in the early 1990s. In 1991, American alternative rock band Pixies released a cover version of the main theme from the arcade game Narc as a B-side to the single "Planet of Sound".

More recently, "video game beats" have appeared in popular songs such as Kesha's "Tik Tok", the best-selling single of 2010, as well as "U Should Know Better" by Robyn featuring Snoop Dogg, and "Hellbound" by Eminem. The influence of video game music can also be seen in contemporary electronica music by artists such as Dizzee Rascal and Kieran Hebden. Grime music in particular samples sawtooth wave sounds from video games which were popular in East London. English power metal band DragonForce is also known for their "retro video game influenced" sound.

== Video game music education ==
Video game music has become part of the curriculum at the degree, undergraduate, and graduate levels in many traditional colleges and universities. According to the Entertainment Software Association, there are over 400 schools offering courses and degrees in video game design in the United States, many of which include sound and music design. Berklee College of Music, Yale University, New York University, and the New England Conservatory have all introduced game music into their music programs. These programs offer immersive education in music composition, orchestration, editing and production. Other post-secondary schools have more games-focused programs, such as DigiPen Institute of Technology, Columbia College Chicago, and Academy of Art University, who all offer programs in Music and Sound Design. These programs include courses in sound effect creation, interactive sound design, and scripting music.

Similar programs have gained popularity in Europe. The Utrecht School of the Arts (Faculty of Art, Media and Technology) has offered a Game Sound and Music Design program since 2003. The University of Hertfordshire has a program in Music Composition and Technology for Film and Games, Leeds Beckett University offers Sound and Music for Interactive Games, and dBs Music Bristol teaches Sound for Games and Apps.

More informal institutions, like the training seminars at GameSoundCon also feature classes in how to compose video game music.

Extracurricular organizations devoted to the performance of video game music have also been implemented in tandem with these new curriculum programs. The Gamer Symphony Orchestra at the University of Maryland performs self-arranged video game music and the Video Game Orchestra is a semiprofessional outgrowth of students from the Berklee College of Music and other Boston-area schools.

According to the National Association for Music Education, video game music is now being taught at elementary and secondary school levels to aid in the understanding of music composition. Students at Magruder High School in Montgomery County, Maryland have even started a student-run gamer orchestra, and many high school bands perform game music.

== Academic study ==
Academic research on video game music began in the late 1990s, and developed through the mid-2000s. Early research on the topic often involved historical studies of game music, or comparative studies of video game music and film music (see, for instance, Zach Whalen's article "Play Along – An Approach to Videogame Music" which includes both). The study of video game music is also known by some as "ludomusicology" – a portmanteau of "ludology" (the study of games and gameplay) and "musicology" (the study and analysis of music) – a term coined independently by Guillaume Laroche and Roger Moseley.

A prominent figure in early video game music and audio research is Karen Collins, who is associate professor at the University of Waterloo and Canada Research Chair in Interactive Audio at the University of Waterloo Games Institute. Her monograph Game Sound: An Introduction to the History, Theory and Practice of Video Game Music and Sound Design (MIT Press 2008) is considered a seminal work in the field, and was influential in the subsequent development of video game music studies.

The Ludomusicology Research Group is an inter-university research organisation focusing on the study of music in games, music games and music in video game culture, composed of four researchers: Michiel Kamp, Tim Summers, Melanie Fritsch, and Mark Sweeney. Together they organise an annual international conference held in the UK or Europe (at the time of writing, the most recent was the Ludo2017 conference held at Bath Spa University). The group was founded by Kamp, Summers and Sweeney in August 2011, who have also edited a collection of essays based around the study of game sound entitled Ludomusicology: Approaches to Video Game Music, published in July 2016. They also edited a double special issue of The Soundtrack and initiated a new book series for the Study in Game Sound and Music in 2017. In September 2016, Tim Summers' book 'Understanding Video Game Music' was published by Cambridge University Press. Fritsch officially joined the group in 2016. She had edited the 2nd issue of the online journal ACT – Zeitschrift für Musik und Performance, published in July 2011, which included ludomusicological contributions written by Tim Summers, Steven B. Reale and Jason Brame. She had been a regular at the conferences since 2012 and published several book chapters on the topic. Whereas Kamp, Summers and Sweeney have a background in musicology, Fritsch's background is in performance studies.

The North American Conference on Video Game Music (NACVGM) is an international conference on video game music held annually in North America since 2014. It is organised by Neil Lerner, Steven Beverburg Reale and William Gibbons.

In late 2016 the Society for the Study of Sound and Music in Games (SSSMG) was launched by the Ludomusicology Research Group in conjunction with the organisers of the North American Conference on Video Game Music and the Audio Mostly conference. The SSSMG has the aim of bringing together both practitioners and researchers from across the globe in order to develop the field's understanding of sound and video game music and audio. Its focus is the use of its website as a "hub" for communication and resource centralisation, including a video game music research bibliography (a project initially begun by the Ludomusicology Research Group).

The Ludomusicology Society of Australia was launched by Barnabas Smith in April 2017, during the Ludo2017 conference in Bath, UK; it aims to "offer a centralised and local professional body nurturing game music studies for academics, people in industry and game music fans alike in the Australasian region."

== Composers ==
Creating and producing video game music requires strong teams and coordination among the different divisions of game development. As the market has expanded, so have the types of jobs in game music. The process often starts with the game designer, who will have a specific musical theme or genre in mind for the game. Their options include contracting original composers or licensing existing music, both of which require other music experts.

During the arcade and early console era (1983 to the mid-1990s), most game music was composed by full-time employees of the particular game company producing the game. This was largely due to the very specialized nature of video game music, where each system had its own technology and tool sets. It was not uncommon for a game company like Capcom or Konami to have a room full of composers, each at their own workstation with headphones writing music.

Once the CD-era hit and studio recorded music became more ubiquitous in games, it became increasingly common for game music to be composed by independent contractors, hired by the game developer on a per-project basis. Most bigger budget games such as Call of Duty, Mass Effect, Ghost Recon, or Lost Planet hire composers in this fashion. Approximately 50% of game composers are freelance, the remaining being employees of a game company. Original score and soundtrack may require the hiring of a music director, who will help create the game music as well as help book the resources needed for performing and recording the music. Some music directors may work with a game's Sound Designer to create a dynamic score. Notable exceptions include composer Koji Kondo, who remains an employee at Nintendo, and Martin O'Donnell, who worked at Bungie until early 2014.

The growth of casual, mobile and social games has greatly increased opportunities for game music composers, with job growth in the US market increasing more than 150% over five years. Independently developed games are a frequent place where beginning game composers gain experience composing for video games. Game composers, particularly for smaller games, are likely to provide other services such as sound design (76% of game composers also do some sound design), integration (47% of game composers also integrate their music into audio middleware), or even computer coding or scripting (15%).

With the rising use of licensed popular music in video games, job opportunities in game music have also come to include the role of a music supervisor. Music supervisors work on behalf of a game developer or game publisher to source pre-existing music from artists and music publishers. These supervisors can be hired on a per-project basis or can work in-house, like the Music Group for Electronic Arts (EA) that has a team of music supervisors. A music supervisor is needed to not only help select music that will suit the game, but to also ensure the music is fully licensed in order to avoid lawsuits or conflicts. Music supervisors may also help negotiate payment, which for artists and songwriters is often a one-time buy-out fee, because games do not generate music royalties when they are sold. A growing trend is to contract artists to write original songs for games, to add to their value and exclusivity, and once again supervisors can be a part of that process.

== Awards ==
=== Current ===
First year	Name	Category
1983	Golden Joystick Awards	Game Audio
1998	D.I.C.E. Awards	Outstanding Original Music Composition
1999	Independent Games Festival	Excellence in Audio
2000	Game Developers Choice Awards	Best Audio
2003	Game Audio Network Guild Awards	
2003	Taipei Game Show Indie Game Awards	Best Audio
2004	British Academy Games Awards	Original Music
2004	International Mobile Gaming Awards	Excellence in Audio
2007	International Film Music Critics Association Awards	Best Original Score for a Video Game or Interactive Media
2011	The New York Game Awards	Tin Pan Alley Award for Best Music in a Game
2012	Grammy Awards, Visual Media Awards	Best Music for Visual Media, Best Compilation Soundtrack for Visual Media, Best Score Soundtrack for Visual Media, and Best Song Written for Visual Media.
2014	Hollywood Music In Media	Original Score, Song, and Song/Score for Mobile Video Game.
2014	The Game Awards	Best Score/Soundtrack.
2014	SXSW Gaming Awards	Excellence in Musical Score
2014	ASCAP Screen Music Awards	Video Game Score of the Year
2016	Game Audio Awards	Best Game Music, Best Sound Design, and Firestarter Award.
2020	The Society of Composers & Lyricists Awards	Outstanding Original Song for Visual Media, Outstanding Original Score for Interactive Media.
2023	Grammy Awards	Best Score Soundtrack for Video Games and Other Interactive Media
2024	BMI Film & TV Awards	Video Game Music

=== Defunct ===
Year	Name	Notes
2003–2014	Spike Video Game Awards	Awards for Best Soundtrack, Best Song in a Game, and Best Original Score
2004–2006	MTV Video Music Award for Best Video Game Soundtrack	
2006	MTV Best Video Game Score	
2010–2011	Ivor Novello Awards for Best Original Video Game Score	

=== Other ===
In 2011, video game music made its first appearance at the Grammy Awards when "Baba Yetu", a song from Civilization IV, won the 53rd annual music awards' Best Instrumental Arrangement Accompanying Vocalists, making it the first video game music to be nominated for (or to win) a Grammy. The song won for its placement on Christopher Tin's album Calling All Dawns, but had been used in the game six years prior. In 2022, video game music made another appearance at the Grammy Awards, with The 8-Bit Big Band's cover (arranged by Charlie Rosen and Jake Silverman) of "Meta Knight's Revenge", a song from Kirby Super Star, winning the 64th Annual Grammy Awards' Grammy Award for Best Arrangement, Instrumental or A Capella.

Other video game awards include the International Film Music Critics Association (IFMCA) award for Best Original Score for Interactive Media and Machinima.com's Inside Gaming Awards for Best Original Score and Best Sound Design.

In addition to recognizing the composers of original score, the Guild of Music Supervisors offer a GMS Award to the music supervisors that select and coordinate licensed music for video games.

== Fan culture ==
Video game music (VGM) fan culture is a form of participatory culture where fans actively reshape the music's meaning outside of the games. Academic research within video game fans studies suggests that analyzing fan-created content (such as remixes, covers, compilations, arrangements, etc.) provides insight into how video game music acquires meaning "outside the game itself", shifting the focus beyond the original composers to the audiences who reinterpret their work. The vast variety of genres within video game music spreads to many different fan audiences, thus leading to the rise of several fan sites and YouTube channels focused on video game music. These fan created spaces are dedicated to the discussion and analysis of video game music, such as Visualizer Music tracks and 8-Bit Music Theory.

Many of those fan sites, such as OverClocked ReMix, that create VGM covers are self-taught musicians, gaining skills through informal learning methods. Those ways can include transcribing by ear, watching online tutorials, and seeking feedback from peers in forums. This informal learning often substitutes for formal music education. In a multicase study of twelve Youtube cover artists, Cayari found that several creators reported that school music did not teach skills needed for online VGM production, such as audio mixing, video editing, and digital distribution. OverClocked ReMix, founded in 1999, established a submission and judging system that requires arrangements to demonstrate significant creative reinterpretation rather than mere transcription, with only 10-15% of submissions accepted. VGM fan culture sustains itself technically and artistically through remakes, remixes, and compilations. With the ease of internet distribution, communities formed for remixing specifically, such as insaneintherainmusic.

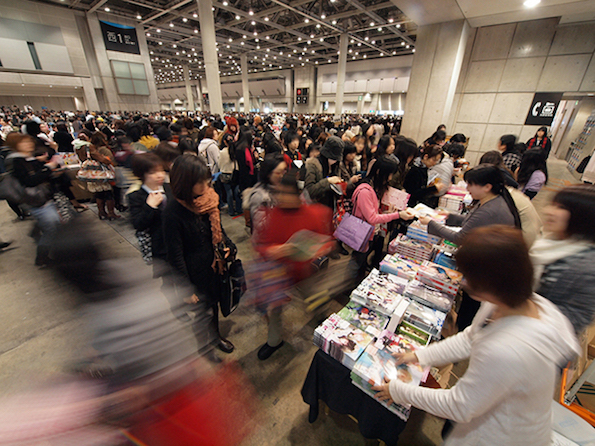
Dojin community at Comiket Convention

Fan communities often function as communities of practice, where newcomers progresses from observing to creating, and eventually mentoring others or organizing collaborative fan projects. Veteran fans become mentors for newer creators also wanting to learn how to create remixes for their favorite VGM. Cayari documents that mentorship manifests in various forms like the production of how-to videos, livestreams of composition processes, and answer questions in comment sections. Many newcomers, however, may be invited to contribute to collaborative fan projects such as multi-artist tribute albums or crowdsourced virtual choirs. This shows the fan culture is not a flat group of people, but a community of practice with mentorship structures. Some amateur OverClocked ReMix submitters have transitioned into professional video game composition careers, including artists who went on to work on commercial titles such as Mass Effect 2 and Shovel Knight. Unlike many western remix communities, the Japanese dōjin music scene is notable for producing albums of arranged VGM, derived from the popular retro franchises such as Mega Man, Chrono Trigger, and Final Fantasy. Their work is tied to physical events such as Comiket, where circles sell self-produced albums directly to fans. There have been over six thousand dōjin albums of the Touhou Project music released alone. This is only one example of numerous communities that have been built and stem from VGM fan culture.

Remixes as a fan content not only build a community, but also represent fan motivation and emotional connection. While appreciation is key, fans also create to "expand the sounds of the original soundtrack," to build an audience for a potential career, or to convey personal emotions and stories. For example, one creator produced a cover of Undertale's "Hopes and Dreams" with original lyrics dedicated to a friend who had died by suicide, releasing it during Suicide Prevention Week. This demonstrates how fans may even process feelings of grief or tell stories through VGM covers. Others have described covers as a way to build an audience before pivoting to original music, using the popularity of well-known game soundtracks to attract listeners. Both taking from the VGM atmosphere story telling as well as fan creators personal emotional feeling from the tracks serve as a motivation for creating and consuming VGM arrangements.

Another popular example involving the participation of fans and their creativity comes from the Genshin Impact fandom. Scholars discussed the model of "actor-network storytelling," when a game deliberately leaves parts of the in-game lore fragmented or ambiguous for fans to interpret on their own. Fans analyze in-game text and promotional trailers to generate theories while others create fan-made music videos and animated short films. The developer of Genshin Impact, HoYoverse, actively encourages this behavior by hosting fan-content events like HoYo Fair. This demonstrates how VGM and game fandoms that make musical remixes can coincide with other factors (narrative storytelling) that brings fandom community together.

VGM fan creators may use digital software to blend their remixes or even use physical hardware for their interpretations. The chiptune community, a subset of VGM fandom, is notable for its technical engagement, with enthusiasts often modifying or circuit-bending older handheld consoles to use them as musical instruments. These can include the Game Boy and NES which repurpose hardware beyond its original design. This technical dimension distinguishes chiptune from software-based remixing and connects VGM fan culture to broader traditions of hardware hacking and DIY electronics. The chiptune genre's origins have been traced through early gaming technology and hacker communities, demonstrating how fan technical practices have shaped a distinct musical genre.

== See also ==
- Circuit bending
- Game rip (audio)
- IEZA Framework
- List of video game musicians
- List of video game soundtracks released on vinyl
- List of video game soundtracks considered the best
- Ludomusicology
- MAGFest
- Music video game
- OverClocked ReMix
- VGMusic.com
- Video Games Live
