= Yamaha YM2608 =

Sound chip

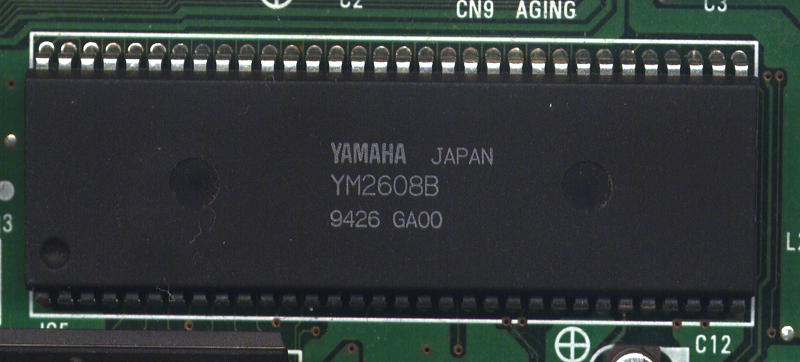
Yamaha YM2608

The YM2608, a.k.a. OPNA, is a sound chip developed by Yamaha. It is a member of Yamaha's OPN family of FM synthesis chips, and is the successor to the YM2203. It was notably used in NEC's PC-8801/PC-9801 series computers.

The YM2608 consists of four internal modules:

- FM Sound Source, a six-channel, four operator FM synthesis sound system based on the YM2203
- SSG Sound Source, a complete internal implementation of the Yamaha YM2149/SSG, a variant of the popular AY-3-8910/PSG for producing three channels of square wave synthesis or noise.
- ADPCM Sound Source, a single channel for samples in 4-bit ADPCM format at a sampling rate between 2–55 kHz
- Rhythm Sound Source, a six-channel ADPCM system, enabling playback of six percussion "rhythm tones" from a built-in ROM

The FM Sound Source includes six concurrent FM synthesis channels and four operators per channel, with eight possible operator interconnections (or algorithms) for producing different types of instrument sounds. The SSG (or Software-controlled Sound Generator) Sound Source is Yamaha's YM2149 programmable sound generator. It includes the SSG's three sound channels, noise generator and dual 8-bit GPIO ports. The chip also includes dual interrupt timers, as well as the addition of a single sine-wave low frequency oscillator (LFO). The YM2608 is used with a YM3016 stereo DAC.

The YMF288, a.k.a. OPN3, is a later development of the YM2608, used in later NEC PC-9801 computer sound cards. It removes the YM2608's GPIO ports, CSM (composite sinusoidal modeling) and the ADPCM Sound Source. It also reduces the wait times on register access, and adds a low-power standby mode. The YMF288 also came in much smaller physical 28-pin SOP and 64-pin QFP packages.

The YM2608 became the basis for two other sound chips in the OPN family, the YM2610 and YM2612, the former of which was most notably used in SNK's Neo-Geo arcade and home console while the latter was most notably used in Sega's Mega Drive (Genesis) console and Fujitsu's FM Towns computers. The YM2610 is directly related to the YM2608, using near-identical specifications, while the YM2612 is a stripped-down version of the YM2608, lacking many features such as the ADPCM and SSG channels. Both chips were based on the FM block of the YM2608 (which in turn was based on the YM2203).

== See also ==
- VGM – an audio file format for multiple video game platforms, including the NEC PC-8801/PC-9801
- Yamaha YM2149
- Yamaha YM2203
- Yamaha YM2610
- Yamaha YM2612
- Sound chip
