= Yamaha OPN =

Sound chip series by Yamaha

The OPN (FM Operator Type-N) series is a family of sound chips developed by Yamaha. It consists of sound chips providing a programmable sound generator (PSG) and FM synthesis for use in computing, music and video game applications.

Ubiquitous in the 1980s and 1990s, the OPN series of chips have found their way into various arcade games, video game consoles and some personal computers as a means of generating sound up until they were supplanted by sample-based chips in the mid-to-late 1990s. Most chips in the OPN series also contained an on-chip PSG while some had dedicated channels for providing sample-based audio of various formats, providing a variety of sound generation methods.

Compared to the low-cost OPL series, the OPN series was designed with four operators on its FM synthesis portion as opposed to two on the OPL chips, similar to that used in most other 4-op FM chips such as the YM2151 as well as in several synthesizers such as the DX21, DX27, DX100 and TX81Z, among others.

== Internal operation ==
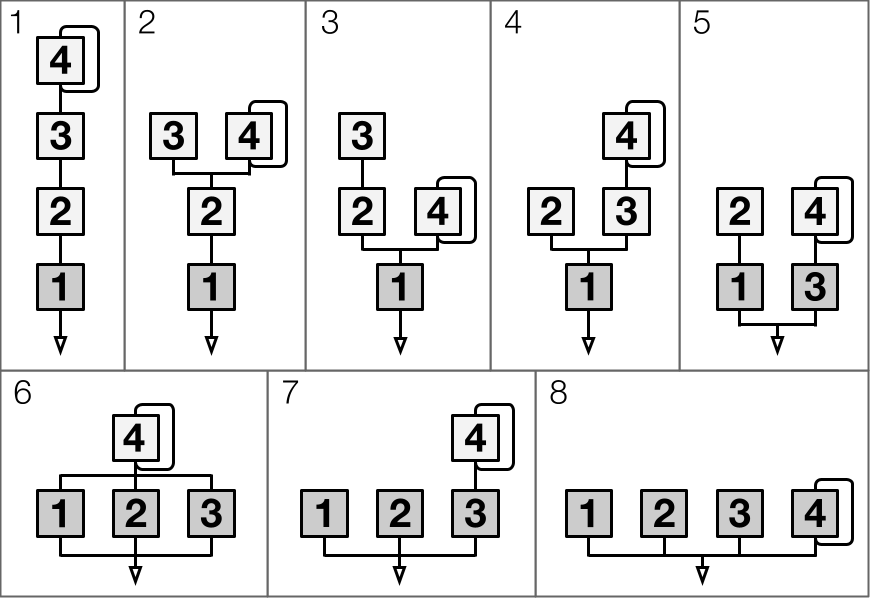
The algorithms available in many of Yamaha's 4-op FM synths, including the OPN series of FM chips, based on that of the DX9

The OPN family of synthesizer chips generate sound via frequency-modulated digital sine waves. It works by phase modulating the instantaneous frequency of each waveform via a modulator. It includes 12 individual operators or "cells", each generating a 13-bit sine wave at a programmable frequency, the volume of which is controlled by a programmable attack, decay, sustain, and release (ADSR) envelope generator. The output of these cells could be either summed together by the mixer or fed into the input of another cell in batches, creating the final sound values or "channels" (also known as "voices"). The number of channels/voices can vary from one chip to another, with most Yamaha-produced FM chips (e.g. YM2151, YM2164, YM2414, etc.) supporting up to eight channels/voices. The OPN series supports up to three, four, and six channels/voices, depending on the chip model.

The OPN series (as well as most other FM chips produced by Yamaha) uses up to four operator cells per channel, which can then be rearranged into eight different permutations of cell connections, or "algorithms" in Yamaha terminology. The eight algorithms are a derivative of the original 32 algorithms found in the Yamaha DX7, which originally used six operators for its algorithms, and were handpicked for use with only four operators in the DX9. The OPN family (as well as many other 4-op FM chips by Yamaha) uses a slightly modified operator arrangement for the third algorithm, differing from that used in the DX9. The ADSR parameters, multiplier and detune settings for each operator, combined with the algorithm chosen, make up what are known as sound presets or "instrument patches".

The resulting digital sound output of each channel through the mixer is then converted to analog sound via a digital-to-analog converter (DAC). The OPN series used two DAC chips, the monaural YM3014 (used for the YM2203 as well as other chips such as the YM2151, YM3526, and YM3812) and the stereo YM3016 (used for the YM2608 and YM2610). The YM2612 on the other hand includes a built-in stereo DAC in lieu of an external DAC chip.

== Chips in the series ==
=== OPN ===
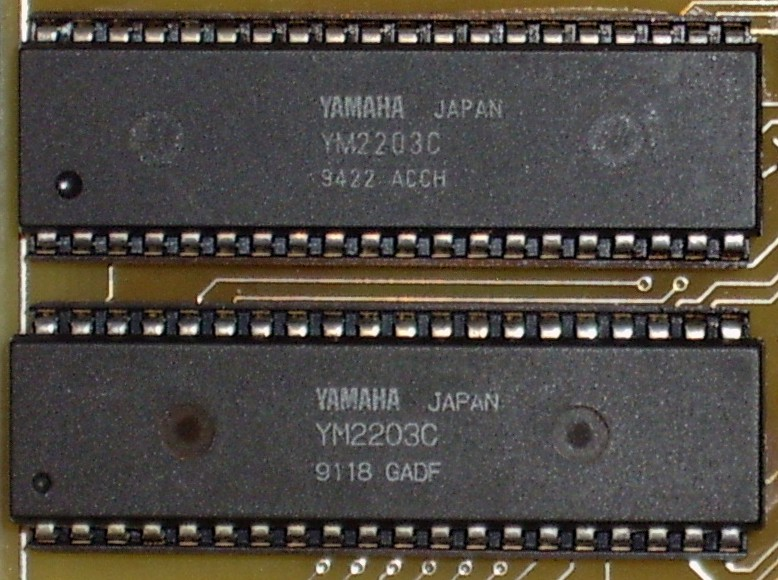
Yamaha YM2203 (two chips)

The YM2203, a.k.a. OPN, was the first member of the OPN family introduced in 1984, featuring a six channel sound system. The primary three channels are dedicated to a four-operator FM synthesizer with eight FM algorithms. It also contains two interval timers, and includes an on-chip implementation of Yamaha's own version of General Instrument's AY-3-8910 PSG sound chip known as the YM2149 (Software-controlled Sound Generator; SSG) that adds three channels of SSG audio capable of producing square waves or noise, as well as an envelope generator and dual General Purpose Input/Output (GPIO) ports.

Unique to the YM2203 as well as all other chips in the OPN series is the ability to set operator frequencies on the third channel independently, allowing for more dissonant harmonics to be generated; this is also known as "special FM3 mode".

=== OPNA ===
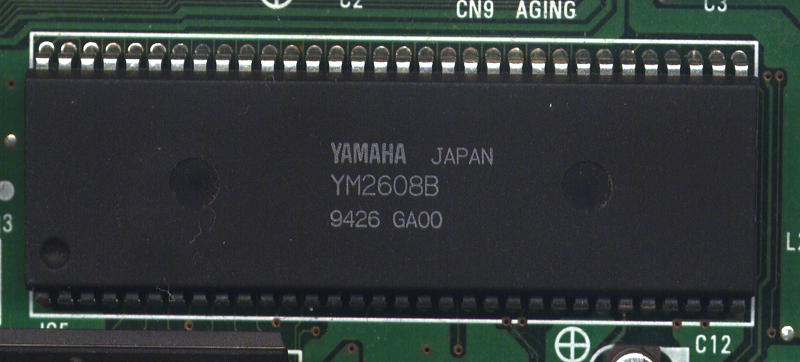
Yamaha YM2608

The YM2608, a.k.a. OPNA, was the second member of the OPN family, released in 1986. It is an improved version of the YM2203, featuring 16 channels of audio playback. It consists of six FM channels (adding an additional three FM channels on top of the YM2203's three existing FM channels), three SSG square wave/noise channels with an envelope generator, and seven adaptive differential pulse-code modulation (ADPCM) channels (one ADPCM channel, six Rhythm channels). It also featured a low-frequency oscillator (LFO), two interval timers, dual GPIO ports, and stereo sound output.

==== OPN3 ====
The YMF288, a.k.a. OPN3 or OPN3-L, is a later variant of the YM2608, released in 1995. It removes certain features such as the ADPCM Sound Source, the lesser-used CSM (composite sinusoidal modeling) mode (which was equivalent to triggering multiple channels simultaneously), and dual GPIO ports. As a result, the number of sound channels is reduced to about 15 (six FM channels, three SSG channels, and six ADPCM Rhythm channels). It also implements a low-power mode, and came in much smaller physical 28-pin SOP and 64-pin QFP packages.

==== OPN4 ====
The YMF297, a.k.a. OPN4, is a sound chip appearing in 1995 that contains both the YMF289 (OPL3-L) and YMF288 (OPN3) chips on one package, however only one chip can be used at any given time. It came on a smaller 44-pin QFP package, and was only known to be used on the PC-9801-118 sound card for NEC's PC-98 series.

=== OPNB ===
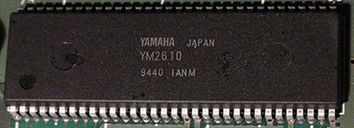
Yamaha YM2610

The YM2610, a.k.a. OPNB, was the third member of the OPN family, released in 1987. It is closely related to the YM2608, providing 14 channels of audio playback. It consists of four FM channels, three SSG square wave/noise channels and seven ADPCM channels (six channel ADPCM-A, one channel ADPCM-B). The YM2610 also includes an LFO and two interval timers, but lacks the GPIO ports of the SSG core found in the YM2203 and YM2608. A variant known as the YM2610B supported up to six FM channels instead of four, bringing the total number of audio channels to 16.

=== OPN2 ===
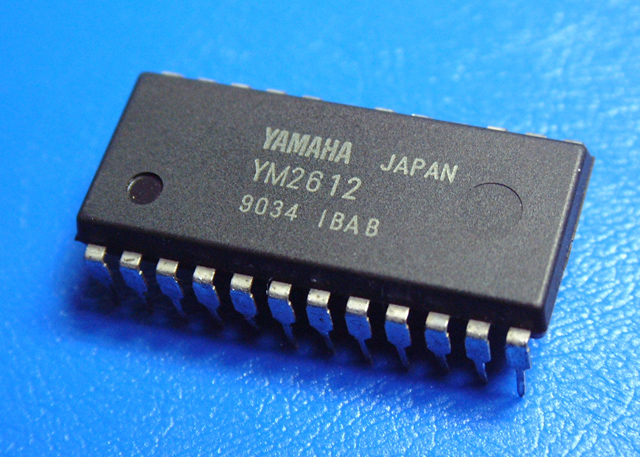
Yamaha YM2612

The YM2612, a.k.a. OPN2, was the fourth member of the OPN family, released in 1988. It is based on the YM2203 and YM2608, featuring a six channel sound system. It removes certain features such as the YM2608's ADPCM channels and the SSG core (which includes three SSG square wave/noise channels and dual GPIO ports, but leaving the envelope generator intact), while also integrating a built-in DAC (similar to the YM2413). The built-in DAC produces a peculiar form of crossover distortion in the output, resulting in some audible quantization noise.

The YM2612 has six FM channels and an LFO, along with two interval timers. Its sixth channel can be swapped out for a basic "DAC" channel that allows it to play 8-bit pulse-code modulation (PCM) samples, with playback rates being controlled in software by the host processor, equating to about five FM channels and one channel dedicated to sampled audio.

==== OPN2C ====
The YM3438, a.k.a. OPN2C, is a variant of the YM2612 introduced in 1989 that features an improved DAC that produces less crossover distortion as well as a higher signal-to-noise ratio than the original chip.

==== OPN2L ====
The YMF276, a.k.a. OPN2L, is a variant of the YM2612 that implements a low-power mode and does not feature a built-in DAC, requiring an external DAC akin to most other Yamaha FM chips. It was used in later models of Fujitsu's FM Towns series of personal computers (particularly the FM Towns II).

== Products using the OPN series ==
The YM2203 was used in certain models of Fujitsu's FM-7 computer series as well as NEC's PC-88 and PC-98 series of personal computers. It was also used in several arcade systems from the 1980s and 1990s, including those by Sega and others.

The YM2608 (along with the YMF288 and its variants) was used in several sound cards for the PC-88 and PC-98 series of personal computers. It was also used in the Marcury-Unit sound card for the X68000, which had two YMF288 chips.

The YM2610 was used in various arcade systems from 1987 to the 1990s, including Taito's arcade systems such as Z System (which uses the YM2610B variant) as well as SNK's Neo Geo arcade systems and game consoles.

The YM2612 was notably used in Sega's Genesis video game console as well as Fujitsu's FM Towns computer series. Its CMOS variant, the YM3438, was used in Sega's arcade systems such as Mega-Play, Sega System C and Sega System 32, as well as in later Genesis systems from 1993 onwards and Fujitsu's FM Towns Marty.

== See also ==
- VGM – an audio file format for multiple video game platforms
- List of sound chips
- List of Yamaha products
- Yamaha OPL
