= Unisound =

Chinese technology company

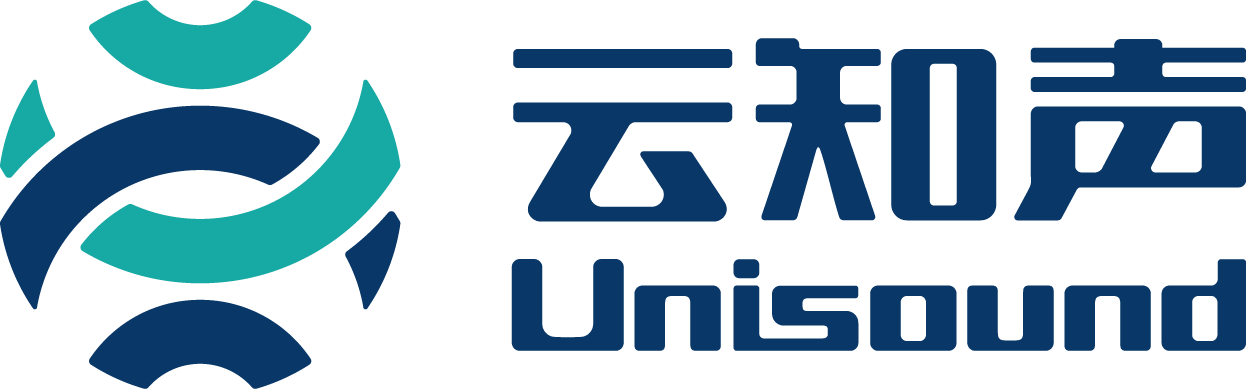
- Native name: 云知声
- Company type: Public
- Traded as: SEHK: 9678
- Industry: Technology
- Founded: 2012
- Headquarters: Beijing, China
- Number of locations: 4
- Area served: Worldwide
- Key people: Huang Wei (CEO)
- Website: unisound.com

Beijing Unisound Information Technology Co., Ltd., often shortened to Unisound, is a Chinese technology company based in Beijing. It is a unicorn startup specialising in speech recognition and artificial intelligence services applicable to a variety of industries.

== History ==
Since the company was founded in 2012 by Huang Wei it has raised over US$250 million. In 2018 Unisound raised US$100 million from the China Electronics Health Fund.

== Technology ==
Unisound has been involved in academic research relating to voice recognition technologies and acoustic modelling powered by deep neural networks.

In 2018, Unisound developed their product Swift which they described as the first AIoT chip due to its combination of AI and IoT technologies. The development of Swift was accelerated due to strategic collaborations with Baidu and IngDan (硬蛋), a subsidiary of the Cogobuy Group. Due to the chip's implementation of deep learning and AI, it is purported to process up to 50 times faster than other AI chips on the market.

Their technology has been developed for industries such as TV manufacturing, air conditioner production, healthcare and automotive technology.
