= Programmable sound generator =

Sound chip that generates audio

A programmable sound generator (PSG) is a sound chip that generates (or synthesizes) audio wave signals built from one or more basic waveforms, and often some kind of noise. PSGs use a relatively simple method of creating sound compared to other methods such as frequency modulation synthesis or pulse-code modulation.

== Technical details ==
PSGs are controlled by writing data to dedicated registers on the chip via an external CPU; hence the name programmable sound generator. One or more basic waveforms are generated (typically a square, triangle or saw-tooth wave) and often a noise signal. The waveforms' frequency and volume (and noise's tone and volume) are typically shaped using an envelope and/or mixed before being sent to the audio output stage.

Many PSGs feature three tone channels and one noise channel including the AY-3-8910, SN76489 and MOS Technology 6581.

== History ==
In the late 1970s, more electronic consumer devices began to be designed with audio features. PSGs were partly developed as a way of incorporating relatively complex sounds at a low cost. PSGs were in many arcade games, game consoles, and home computers of the 1980s and 90s.

In 1978, General Instrument released the AY-3-8910, the design of which was later licensed by Yamaha Corporation for their YM2149. These chips were used as the standard for the MSX computer standards 1 and 2, respectively. The features of this chip were also incorporated into other Yamaha sound chips including the YM2203 and YM2608 chips, these were also capable of FM synthesis. In the same year Atari designed the POKEY chip for its home computers and game systems. It incorporated a PSG.

In 1979, Texas Instruments SN76489 was produced for the TI-99/4 computer. This was also used in the IBM PCjr and Tandy 1000.

In 1982, MOS Technology 6581 (SID) was produced for the Commodore 64. The main chip in the Nintendo Entertainment System, the Ricoh 2A03, included a PSG.

== See also ==
- List of sound card standards
- List of Yamaha sound chips
