= Sound chip =

Integrated circuit designed to produce audio signals

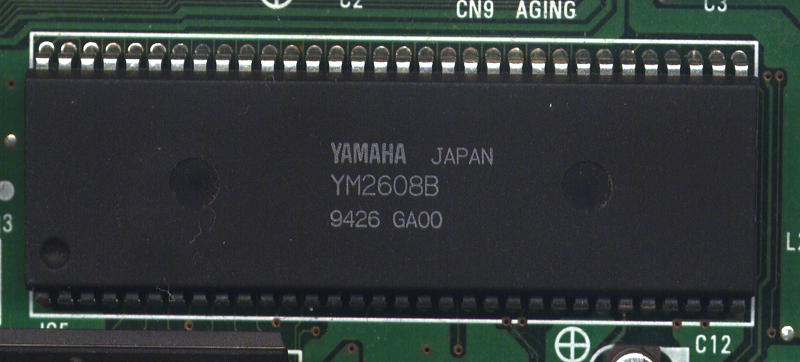
A Yamaha YM2608 FM synthesis chip

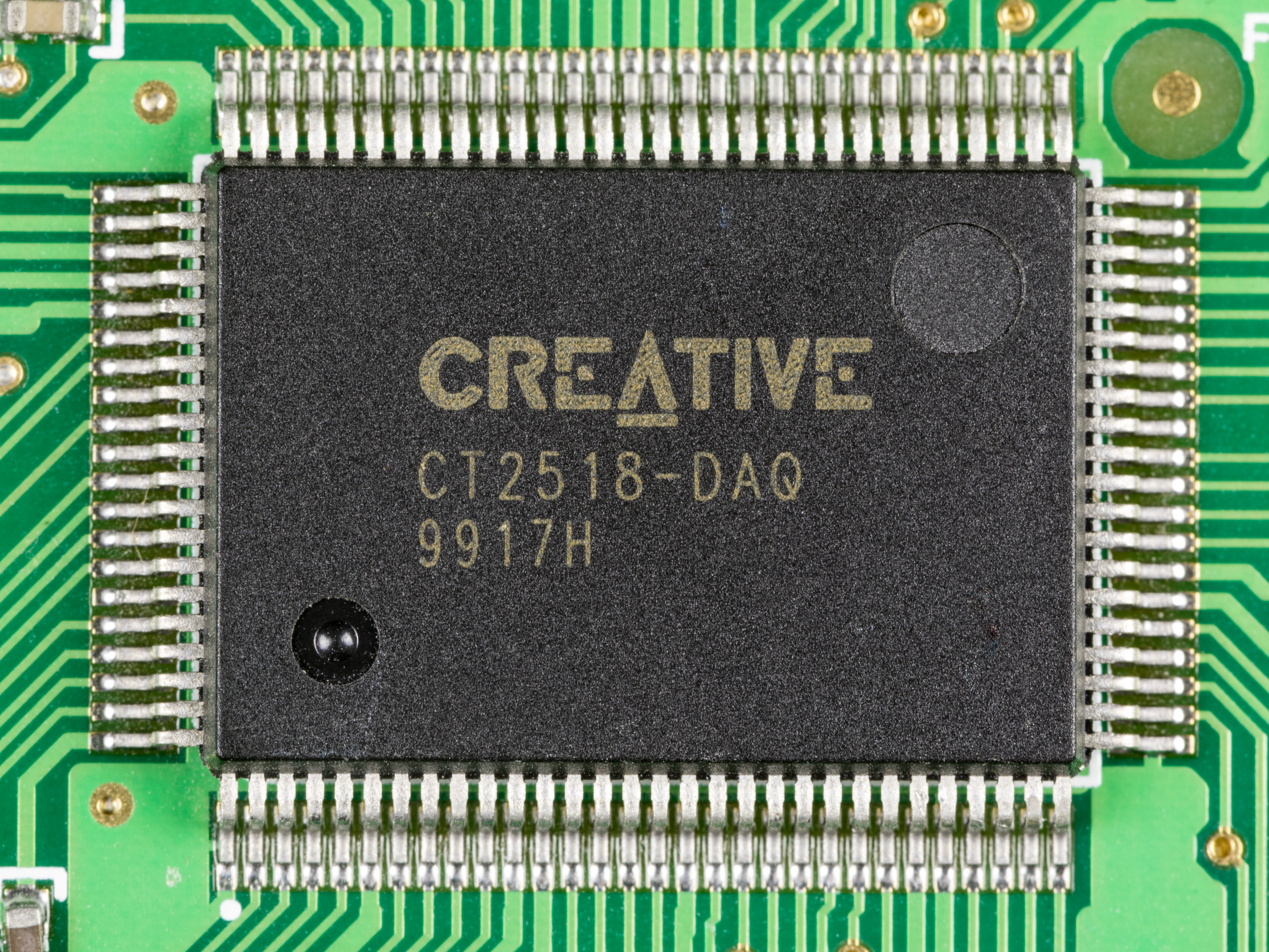
A Creative Technology Sound Blaster chip found in a computer sound card

A sound chip is an integrated circuit (chip) designed to produce audio signals through digital, analog or mixed-mode electronics. Sound chips are typically fabricated on metal–oxide–semiconductor (MOS) mixed-signal chips that process audio signals. They normally contain audio components such as oscillators, envelope generators, samplers, filters, amplifiers.

== History ==
A number of sound synthesis methods for electronically producing sound were devised during the late 20th century. These include programmable sound generators (PSG), wavetable synthesis, and frequency modulation synthesis (FM synthesis). Such sound chips were widely used in arcade game system boards, video game consoles, home computers and digital synthesizers.

Since the late 1990s, pulse-code modulation (PCM) sampling has been the standard for many sound chips, as used in the Intel High Definition Audio (IHDA) standard of 2004. The PCM sampling method is used in many mobile phones and sound cards for personal computers. This widespread use is part of the digital sound revolution that started in the 1980s.

== Types ==
There are multiple types of sound chips, which are divided based on their use.

- Programmable sound generators
- Synthesis
  - Wavetable synthesis
  - Frequency modulation synthesis
- Sampling
  - Pulse-code modulation sampling
- Sound enhancement effects
  - Audio equalizer
  - Resampling compensation
  - Proprietary sound enhancer such as Dolby Atmos

While traditional sound chips focus on general audio synthesis (e.g., in PCs or musical instruments), voice chips represent a specialized category optimized for voice-related applications. Based on market trends, they can be divided into five primary types, each with distinct technical characteristics and use cases.

Voice chips
Type	Core features
One-time programmable (OTP) voice chips	OTP, short playback duration, low audio quality, non-rewritable; Extremely low cost but high minimum order quantity; Example: Vehicle reversing alerts, simple toy prompts
Flash voice chips	Built-in or external flash storage, supports WAV encoding (e.g., WT588D, ISD series); Require dedicated tools for voice burning, cumbersome operation; Moderate audio quality, no significant cost-performance advantage
MP3 voice chips	Dominant market solution with integrated MP3 decoding; Includes dedicated audio DSP, MCU, and external storage (e.g., TF cards); Representative models: KT404A series, KT142C series; Advantages: USB voice updates, flexible volume control, combined playback (e.g., amounts/license plates/time); Disadvantage: Higher power consumption (unsuitable for low-power toys)
Text-to-speech (TTS) voice chips	High technical barrier (require Digital Signal Processing (DSP)-level chips), limited suppliers (e.g., iFlytek, Unisound); Support TTS via universal asynchronous receiver-transmitter（UART）interface; Drawbacks: Robotic voice quality, extremely high cost
Voice dialog chips	Support local/cloud-based voice recognition; Local recognition: Low-end toys (e.g., voice-controlled dolls); Cloud recognition: Requires Wi-Fi or mobile connectivity, higher latency; High-end solutions are costly

== Applications ==
Sound chips are commonly used in various digital electronic devices, particularly personal computers (including sound cards and motherboards), video game systems (including arcade system boards and video game consoles), electronic musical instruments (including synthesizers, digital synthesizers and electronic keyboards), and digital telecommunications (including digital telephony, digital television, mobile phones and smartphones).

== See also ==
- Digital audio
- List of sound card standards
- List of sound chips
