= VGM (file format) =

Sequenced audio file format

VGM (Video Game Music) is an audio file format for multiple video game platforms, such as Master System, Game Gear, Mega Drive/Genesis, MSX, Neo Geo, IBM compatibles (Adlib/SoundBlaster), and has expanded to a variety of arcade system boards since its release.

The standard filename extension is .vgm, but files can also be Gzip compressed into .vgz files. Technically .vgz files should be named .vgm.gz, but because some operating systems' file managers cannot handle file name suffixes that themselves contain a period (e.g. Microsoft Windows), .vgz is instead used in order to launch a VGM player and not a file archiver program such as WinZip or WinRAR.

The VGM format is different from formats like NSF or SID, which contain the game's music code. Instead, the instructions sent to the sound chip are logged.

Files begin with the four-byte identifier "Vgm " (0x56 0x67 0x6D 0x20), followed by the file version stored as binary-coded decimal; for example version 1.71 is stored as 0x00000171.
