= List of sound chips =

Sound chips come in different forms and use a variety of techniques to generate audio signals. This is a list of sound chips that were produced by a certain company or manufacturer, categorized by the sound generation of the chips.

== Programmable sound generators (PSG) ==
Manufacturer	Chip	Year	Channels	Applications	Notes	Ref
Atari, Inc.	Television Interface Adaptor (TIA)	1977	2	Atari 2600 and Atari 7800 video game consoles, Video Music (music visualizer for TV)	Combined sound and graphics chip, metal–oxide–semiconductor (MOS) integrated circuit	
Atari, Inc.	POKEY	1979	4	Atari 8-bit, Atari 5200, some Atari arcade machines, certain Atari 7800 cartridges		
Atari, Inc.	Atari AMY	1983	64/8	Intended for 65XEM (never released)	HMOS (depletion mode NMOS) chip, additive synthesis chip (64 oscillators, 8 frequency ramps)	
Atari, Inc.	Atari MIKEY	1989	4	For the Atari Lynx	Combined sound and LCD driver, has 4-channels with an 8-bit DAC	
General Instrument	AY-3-8910	1978	3	Arcade boards (DECO, Taito Z80, Konami Scramble, Irem M27, Konami 6809, Capcom Z80), computers (Colour Genie, Oric 1, MSX, Amstrad CPC, ZX Spectrum 128, Elektor TVGC, Mockingboard, Speech/Sound Program Pak (TRS-80 Color Computer)), Intellivision	N-type MOS (NMOS) large-scale integration (LSI) chip	
General Instrument	SP0250	1981	1	Sega G80 arcade system board	Linear predictive coding (LPC) speech synthesis NMOS chip	
General Instrument	SP0256	1984	1	Intellivoice (Intellivision), MicroSpeech (ZX Spectrum), Datel Electronics Vox Box (ZX Spectrum), Tandy Voice Synthesizer (TRS-80), VIC-20 and Atari 8-bit serial-connected and homebrew kits, Fuzzbuster radar detector	LPC speech synthesis NMOS LSI chip	
Konami	RC	1981	1	Konami Scramble and Gyruss arcade system boards		
Konami	VRC6	1989	3	Certain Konami-produced Famicom cartridges		
MOS Technology	VIC (6560 / 6561)	1977	4	VIC-1001 and VIC-20	Combined sound and graphics NMOS chip	
MOS Technology	SID (6581 / 8580)	1981	3	Commodore 64 and Commodore 128 computers, Elektron SidStation synthesizer sound module	NMOS chip (6581) / HMOS-II chip (8580)	
MOS Technology	TED (7360 / 8360)	1983	2	Commodore 16, Plus/4	HMOS chip	
Microchip Technology	AY8930	1989	3	Covox Sound Master Card		
Oki Electric Industry	Oki MSM5232	1983	8	Arcade games (particularly Taito games), Korg Poly-800 polyphonic synthesiser	Complementary MOS (CMOS) chip	
Philips	Philips SAA1099	1984	6	SAM Coupé, Creative Music System (also known as Game Blaster)		
Ricoh	Ricoh 2A03 / 2A07	1983	5	Nintendo Entertainment System (Famicom) home console (hardware expandable), arcade game Punch-Out!!	NMOS chip, delta modulation channel (DMC) is for pulse-code modulation (PCM) sampling, 7-bit DAC.	
Sega	Sega Melody Generator	1981	1	Sega G80 arcade system board		
Sharp Corporation	Sharp LR35902	1989	4	Game Boy, Game Boy Color, Game Boy Advance	In Game Boy Advance, it's used for Game Boy/Game Boy Color mode and supports software-mixed PCM as a secondary function.	
Sharp Corporation	Sharp SM8521	1997	1	Game.com	Noise generator	
Sunsoft	Sunsoft 5B	1992	3	Famicom cartridge Gimmick!	Derivative of Yamaha YM2149F	
Texas Instruments	SN76477	1978	1	Space Invaders arcade system board, ABC 80		
Texas Instruments	LPC Speech Chips	1978	1	Speak & Spell, Speak & Math, Speak & Read, arcade games	Pitch-excited LPC (PE-LPC) speech synthesizer, digital signal processor (DSP), P-type MOS (PMOS) chip	
Texas Instruments	SN76489 (DCSG)	1979	4	Various arcade system boards, Master System console, BBC Micro home computer, Sharp MZ-800, IBM PCjr and TI-99/4A computers		
Texas Instruments	SN76489A (DCSG)	1982	4	ColecoVision and SG-1000 consoles		
Texas Instruments	SN76496	1982	4	Tandy 1000 computer		
Texas Instruments	TMS3615	1981	2	Arcade games		
Texas Instruments	TMS3617					
Texas Instruments	TMS3630					
Texas Instruments	TMS3631-RI104 / RI105					
Toshiba	Toshiba T7766A	1988	3	Some MSX models (MSX-Engine)	AY-3-8910 compatible chip (has the same pinout)	
Unisonic Technologies Company	UM66, TXXL series		1 or 2		3-pin CMOS LSI based chip that contains pre-programmed read-only memory (ROM)	
Yamaha	Yamaha YM2149 (SSG)	1983	3	Various arcade boards, MSX computers (including Yamaha CX5M), Atari ST computer	NMOS LSI chip based on AY-3-8910	
Yamaha	Yamaha / Sega VDP PSG (SN76496)	1984	4	SG-1000 II, Master System, Mega Drive/Genesis and Pico consoles, Game Gear handheld game console	Based on Texas Instruments SN76496. Integrated into the Yamaha YM2217, Yamaha YM2602, and Yamaha YM7101 VDP chips. In Mega Drive/Genesis, it is both secondary to the Yamaha YM2612 FM chip and for Master System mode.	
Yamaha	Yamaha YM3439 (SSGC)	1991	3	Atari Falcon and MSX computers	CMOS LSI variant of YM2149	

== Wavetable synthesis ==
Manufacturer(s)	Chip	Year	Channels	Applications	Notes	Ref
Atmel / Dream	SAM9407	1993	4	Quasimidi digital synthesizers (Caruso, Quasar, Technox, Raven, Raven MAX), computer sound cards (Guillemot Maxi Sound 64 Dynamic 3D, Maxi Sound Home Studio 64 Pro, Hoontech ST128 Gold & Ruby and Soundtrack Digital Audio, TerraTec AudioSystem EWS64L/XL/XXL/SHome Studio Pro 64, Home Studio)	High-speed CMOS (HCMOS) chip	
Atmel / Dream	SAM9707	1998	4	Quasimidi digital synthesizers (Rave-O-Lution 309, Sirius, Polymorph)	Digital signal processor (DSP) core	
Ensoniq	Ensoniq 5503	1984	32	Mirage synthesizer and Apple IIGS computer		
Hudson Soft / NEC / Epson	Hudson Soft HuC6280	1987	6	NEC's PC Engine (TurboGrafx-16) console	CMOS chip	
Konami	Konami SCC	1987	5	Certain arcade system boards, game cartridges for MSX		
Namco	Namco WSG (Waveform Sound Generator)	1980	3	Several Namco arcade system boards (including Namco Pac-Man and Namco Galaga)		
Namco	Namco 52xx (Audio Processor)	1981	1	Namco Galaga and Namco Pole Position arcade system boards		
Namco	Namco 54xx (Audio Generator)	1982	8	Namco Pole Position arcade system board		
Namco	Namco 15xx (WSG)	1982	8	Namco Super Pac-Man arcade system board		
Namco	Namco CUS30	1984	8	Namco Pac-Land, Namco Thunder Ceptor, System 86 and Namco System 1 arcade boards	Similar to the earlier 15xx WSG, but capable of stereo sound.	
Namco	Namco 163 (N163)	1987	8	Namco-produced Famicom games		
Nintendo	VSU-VUE	1995	6	Virtual Boy portable console	Silicon-gate CMOS chip	
Ricoh	Ricoh 2C33	1986	1	Famicom Disk System		
Sharp Corporation	Sharp LR35902	1989	1	Game Boy, Game Boy Color, Game Boy Advance	In Game Boy Advance, it's used for Game Boy/Game Boy Color mode and supports software-mixed PCM as a secondary function.	
Sharp Corporation	Sharp SM8521	1997	2	Game.com		

== Frequency modulation (FM) synthesis ==
Manufacturer	Chip	Year	Total FM operators	Max FM channels	Max ops / channel	Applications	Notes	Ref
ESS Technology	ESFM synthesizer	1994	72	18	4	Most ESS Tech sound chips (ES1868/69 being most common)	Based on Yamaha YMF262 (OPL3) silicon-gate CMOS chip. Includes wavetable interface. Two modes, one "OPL2/3 compatible" and the other the native superset.	
Konami	VRC7	1990	12	6	2	Famicom cartridge Lagrange Point	Modified derivative of Yamaha YM2413 (OPLL). Labeled as DS1001 by Yamaha as an internal code.	
Yamaha	YM2128 (OPS) / YM2129 (EGS)	1983	96	16	6	Yamaha digital synthesizers (DX7, DX1, DX5, DX9, TX7, TX216, TX416, TX816)	Chipset (OPS operator chip, EGS envelope generator chip)	
Yamaha	Yamaha YM2151 (a.k.a. OPM)	1983	32	8	4	Mid-1980s to mid-1990s arcade systems (the most prolific FM chip used in arcades), Sharp X1 and X68000 computers, MSX (CX5M, Yamaha SFG-01 and SFG-05 FM Sound Synthesizer Unit), Yamaha digital synthesizers (DX21, DX27, DX100)	NMOS chip (depletion-load)	
Yamaha	Yamaha YM2203 (a.k.a. OPN)	1984	12	3	4	Some 1980s arcade games, NEC computers (PC-88, PC-98, NEC PC-6001mkII SR, PC-6601 SR)	3 additional Yamaha YM2149 SSG square wave channels, silicon-gate NMOS LSI chip	
Yamaha	Yamaha YM3526 (a.k.a. OPL)	1984	18	9	2	Bubble Bobble arcade game, Commodore 64 SFX Sound Expander	Silicon-gate CMOS LSI chip	
Yamaha	Yamaha Y8950 (a.k.a. MSX-AUDIO)	1984	18	9	2	MSX-Audio cartridges for MSX (Panasonic FS-CA1, Toshiba HX-MU900, and Philips NMS-1205)	Very similar to Yamaha YM3526, additional adaptive differential PCM (ADPCM) channel, silicon-gate CMOS LSI chip	
Yamaha	Yamaha YM2164 (a.k.a. OPP)	1985	32	8	4	Yamaha FB-01 MIDI Expander, IBM Music Feature Card, MSX (Yamaha CX5M and SFG-05), Korg DS-8 and 707 digital synthesizers	Based on Yamaha YM2151 (OPM)	
Yamaha	Yamaha YM3812 (a.k.a. OPL2)	1985	18	9	2	Sound cards for PC (including AdLib and early Sound Blaster cards), Yamaha Portasound keyboards (PSR and PSS series)	Silicon-gate CMOS LSI chip	
Yamaha	Yamaha YM2413 (a.k.a. OPLL)	1986	18	9	2	Japanese Master System, Sega Mark III, MSX (in MSX Music cartridges like the FM-PAC, and internally in several Japanese models by Panasonic, Sony and Sanyo), Yamaha Portasound digital keyboards (PSS-140, PSS-170, PSS-270)	Silicon-gate NMOS LSI chip	
Yamaha	YM2604 (OPS2) / YM3609 (EGM)	1986	96	16	6	Yamaha DX7 II and TX802 digital synthesizers	Chipset (OPS2 operator chip, EGM envelope generator chip)	
Yamaha	Yamaha YM2608 (a.k.a. OPNA)	1986	24	6	4	NEC PC-88 and PC-98 computers	3 additional Yamaha YM2149 SSG square wave channels, 7 additional ADPCM channels, silicon-gate NMOS LSI chip	
Yamaha	Yamaha YM2414 (a.k.a. OPZ)	1987	32	8	4	Yamaha digital synthesizers (TX81Z, DX11, YS200), Korg Z3 guitar synthesizer		
Yamaha	Yamaha YM2610 (a.k.a. OPNB)	1987	16	4	4	SNK's Neo Geo console, arcade systems (particularly Neo Geo and Taito games)	7 additional ADPCM channels	
Yamaha	Yamaha YM2612 (a.k.a. OPN2)	1988	24	6	4	Sega Mega Drive/Genesis console, FM Towns computer, Sega arcade systems	PCM supported on one of the channels	
Yamaha	Yamaha YM3438 (a.k.a. OPN2C)	1989	24	6	4	Sega Mega Drive/Genesis console (later models), FM Towns computer, Sega arcade systems	Improved Yamaha YM2612, PCM supported on one of the channels, silicon-gate CMOS LSI chip	
Yamaha	Yamaha YMF262 (a.k.a. OPL3)	1990	36	18	4	Sound Blaster Pro 2.0 and later cards for PC (including Sound Blaster 16, AdLib Gold 1000 and AWE32)	Silicon-gate CMOS chip	
Yamaha	Yamaha YMF271 (a.k.a. OPX)	1993	36	18	4		12 additional PCM channels	
Yamaha	Yamaha YMF278 (a.k.a. OPL4)	1993	36	18	4	Moonsound cartridge for MSX computer		
Yamaha	Yamaha YMF292 (a.k.a. SCSP)	1994	32	32	32	Sega Saturn console, Sega ST-V, Model 2A/2B/2C CRX and Model 3 arcade systems	PCM supported	
Yamaha	Yamaha YMF288 (a.k.a. OPN3)	1995	24	6	4	NEC PC-98 computer	Based on Yamaha YM2608 (OPNA)	
Yamaha	Yamaha YMF7xx (a.k.a. OPL3-SA)	1997	36	18	4	Embedded audio chipset in some laptops and sound cards (including PCI, ISA and Yamaha Audician 32)	Integrates Yamaha YMF262 (OPL3)	
Yamaha	Yamaha YMU757 (a.k.a. MA-1)	1999	8	4	2	Some 2000s and 1990s cellphones, PDAs		
Yamaha	Yamaha YMU759 (a.k.a. MA-2)	2000	32	16	2	Some 2000s cellphones, PDAs	8 channels for 4 operators, an additional ADPCM channel	
Yamaha	Yamaha YMU762 (a.k.a. MA-3)	2001	64	32	2	Some 2000s cellphones, PDAs	16 channels for 4 operators, 8 additional PCM/ADPCM channels	
Yamaha	Yamaha YMU765 (a.k.a. MA-5)	2003	64	32	2	Some 2000s cellphones, PDAs	32 PCM/ADPCM channels, 16 channels for 4 operators	
Yamaha	Yamaha YMU786 (a.k.a. MA-7)	2005	64	32	2	Some 2000s cellphones, PDAs	32 PCM/ADPCM channels, 16 channels for 4 operators	
Yamaha	Yamaha YMF825 (a.k.a. SD-1)	2011	32	16	4			

== Pulse-code modulation (PCM) sampling ==
Manufacturer(s)	Chip	Year	Max PCM channels	Max sample depth (bits)	Max sample rate (Hz)	Applications	Notes	Ref
Analog Devices	AD1848	1992	Variable, with multiple stereo channels	16	48,000	Original Windows Sound System card by Microsoft, Ensoniq Soundscape S-2000 and Elite cards	Digital-to-analog codec chip, 2-channel stereo input/output	
ARM Ltd.	VIDC20	1994	8	16	44,100	Risc PC computer		
Atari Corporation	Jerry	1993	Variable, limited by software	16	44,100	Jaguar console	DSP, also supports pulse-width modulation (PWM) and wavetable synthesis	
Atari Corporation	SDMA (Sound/DMA)	1992	8	16	49,170	Falcon computer	Integrates Motorola 56001 DSP	
Crystal Semiconductor	CS4231	1992	1	16	48,000	Windows Sound System compatible, Gravis Ultrasound card		
Drucegrove	Digitalker MM54104	1980	1	1	13,000	Namco Galaxian (King & Balloon) and Scorpion arcade system boards, National Semiconductor Digitalker DT1050 speech synthesizer	Delta modulation (DM) differential PCM (DPCM) speech synthesis chip	
Gravis	GF1	1992	32	16	44,100	Gravis Ultrasound card		
Harris Corporation	HC-55516	1981	1	1	32,000	Irem M27 (Red Alert), Sinistar and Midway Y Unit arcade system boards	Continuously variable slope DM (CVSD) adaptive DM (ADM) speech decoder	
Intel	Intel High Definition Audio (IHDA)	2004	8	32	192,000	IBM Personal Computer, IBM PC compatible computers		
Konami	Konami K007232	1986	2	7	32,000	Konami Bubble System, Twin 16 and TMNT based arcade boards	PCM	
Konami	Konami K053260	1990	4	12	32,000	Konami TMNT based arcade board	KDSC	
Konami	Konami K054539	1991	8	16	32,000	Konami Xexex based, Mystic Warriors based and GX arcade boards	ADPCM	
Macronix	Flipper	2001	Variable, limited by software	16	48,000	GameCube and Wii console	ADPCM, Dolby Pro Logic II (AC-3)	
MOS Technology	MOS Technology 8364 "Paula"	1985	4	8	28,000	Amiga computer		
Namco	Namco C140	1987	24	12	42,780	Namco System 2 and System 21 arcade boards		
Namco	Namco C219	1992	16	12	42,780	Namco NA-1 and NA-2 arcade system boards		
Namco	Namco C352	1992	32	16	42,670	Namco System 22, System FL, NB-1, NB-2, ND-1, System 11, System 12 and System 23 arcade boards	Linear PCM (LPCM) and μ-law PCM samples supported	
National Semiconductor	LMC1992	1989	4	8	50,000	Atari STE and TT030 personal computers		
NEC	μPD7751	1985	3	8	8,000	Sega System 16 arcade boards	ADPCM, Speech synthesis chip	
NEC	μPD7759	1987	1	8	8,000	Sega System 16B and System C2 arcade boards, Sega Pico console	ADPCM, Speech synthesis chip	
NVIDIA	MCPX	2001	64	16	48,000	Xbox console	3D sound support, Dolby Pro Logic, DTS, DSP, MIDI DLS2 Support	
Oki Electric Industry	Oki MSM5205	1979	1	12	32,000	Various arcade system boards (Irem M-52, Data East Z80, Capcom 68000), NEC's PC Engine CD-ROM² (TurboGrafx-CD) game console	Adaptive DPCM (ADPCM) chip	
Oki Electric Industry	Oki MSM6258	1987	1	12	15,600	Sharp's X68000 computer	ADPCM	
Oki Electric Industry	Oki MSM6295	1987	4	12	7,576 (max, 1 MHz); 32,000 (max, 4 MHz)	Various arcade system boards (including Capcom's CP System)	ADPCM	
Oki Electric Industry	Oki MSM9810	1999	8	14	32,000	Sammy arcade system boards	ADPCM	
QSound	QSound DSP16A	1992	16	16	24,000	Capcom's CP System Dash and CP System II arcade system boards, Sony's ZN-1 and ZN-2 arcade system boards	PCM/ADPCM, positional 3D audio support via QSound	
Ricoh	Ricoh 2A03 / 2A07	1983	1	7	33166	Nintendo Entertainment System (Famicom) home console (hardware expandable), arcade game Punch-Out!!	NMOS chip, DM channel (DMC) is for PCM sampling	
Ricoh	Ricoh RF5c68	1989	8	8	19,800	Fujitsu's FM Towns computer, Sega System 18 and System 32 arcade boards		
Ricoh	Ricoh RF5C164	1991	8	8	31,300	Sega CD console add-on	1.5 μm silicon-gate CMOS chip	
Roland Corporation	Roland LA32	1987	16	16	32,000	Roland synthesizers (D-50, D550, D10, D20, D110), Roland MT-32 MIDI sound module (X68000, Amiga, Atari ST, IBM PC, NEC PC-88, PC-98)	Linear Arithmetic synthesis (LA synthesis)	
Sanyo	VLM5030 Speech Synthesizer	1983	1	8	8,136	Arcade game Punch-Out!!	Speech synthesis chip	
Sega	SegaPCM	1985	16	8	31,250	Sega arcade systems (Sega Space Harrier, Sega OutRun, X Board, Y Board)		
SGI	Reality Signal Processor (RSP)	1996	Variable, limited by software	16	48,000	Nintendo 64 console	DSP, combined sound and graphics processor, ADPCM, MP3 support	
Sharp Corporation	Sharp SM8521	1997	1	8	32,768	Game.com handheld		
Sony	Sony SPC700 (Nintendo S-SMP)	1990	8	16	32,000	Super Nintendo Entertainment System console	Bit Rate Reduction (BRR) ADPCM	
Sony	Sony SPU (Sound Processing Unit)	1994	24	16	44,100	Sony PlayStation and PlayStation 2 consoles	ADPCM; two cores on PS2	
Sony	Sony SPU2	1999	48	16	48,000	Sony PlayStation 2 and early PlayStation 3 consoles	ADPCM, Dual-core sound unit, Supports Dolby Digital (AC-3), DTS; emulated on PS3 for backwards compatible PS1/PS2 games	
Yamaha	Yamaha Y8950 (a.k.a. MSX-AUDIO)	1984	1	16	~50,000	MSX-Audio cartridges for MSX	ADPCM, Speech synthesis chip	
Yamaha	Yamaha YM2608 (a.k.a. OPNA)	1985	7	16 (12 for RSS)	55,500 (18518 for RSS)	NEC PC-88 and PC-98 computers	ADPCM	
Yamaha	Yamaha YM2610 (a.k.a. OPNB)	1987	7	16 (12 for ADPCM-A)	55,500 (18518 for ADPCM-A)	SNK's Neo Geo console, arcade systems (particularly Neo Geo and Taito games)	ADPCM	
Yamaha	Yamaha YM2612 (a.k.a. OPN2)	1988	1	8	26,633 (SMD); 29,000 (System 32); 44,100 (max)	Sega Mega Drive/Genesis console, FM Towns computer, Sega arcade systems		
Yamaha	Yamaha YMW258-F (a.k.a. GEW8) (Sega MultiPCM)	1991	28	16	44,100	Sega arcade boards (System Multi 32, Model 1, Model 2), Yamaha instruments (MU-5 and TG-100 sound modules, Portasound keyboards, QR-10, QY-20 workstation)	Advanced Wave Memory (AWM) sampling	
Yamaha	Yamaha YMF271 (a.k.a. OPX)	1993	12	12	44,100			
Yamaha	Yamaha YMF278 (a.k.a. OPL4)	1993	24	16	44,100	Moonsound cartridge for MSX computer		
Yamaha	Yamaha YMF292 (a.k.a. SCSP)	1994	32	16	44,100	Sega Saturn console, Sega arcade systems (Sega ST-V, Model 2A CRX/2B CRX/2C CRX and Model 3)		
Yamaha	Yamaha YMZ280B (a.k.a. PCMD8)	1995	8	16	44,100	Cave, Data East, and Psikyo arcade systems	ADPCM supported	
Yamaha	Yamaha AICA	1998	64	16	48,000	Dreamcast console, Sega arcade systems (Sega NAOMI, Hikaru, and NAOMI 2)	ADPCM	
Yamaha	Yamaha YMU759 (a.k.a. MA-2)	2000	1	8	8,000	Some 2000s cellphones, PDAs	ADPCM	
Yamaha	Yamaha YMU762 (a.k.a. MA-3)	2001	8	8	48,000	Some 2000s cellphones, PDAs	ADPCM supported	
Yamaha	Yamaha YMU765 (a.k.a. MA-5)	2003	32	8	48,000	Some 2000s cellphones, PDAs	ADPCM, Analog Lite, and speech synthesis supported	
Yamaha	Yamaha YMU786 (a.k.a. MA-7)	2005	32	8	48,000	Some 2000s cellphones, PDAs	DSP, ADPCM, Analog Lite, speech synthesis and MP3 supported	

== See also ==
- List of sound card standards
- List of Yamaha sound chips
- Sound recording and reproduction
