= Yamaha YMF278 =

Sound chip

The Yamaha YMF278 or YMF278B, also known as the OPL4 (OPL is an acronym for FM Operator Type-L), is a sound chip that incorporates both FM synthesis and sample-based synthesis (often incorrectly called "wavetable synthesis") by Yamaha.

== Frequency modulation synthesis component ==
The FM part is essentially a YMF262 (OPL3) block; thus, it is also backward-compatible with the YM3526 (OPL) and the YM3812 (OPL2). Like the OPL3, it can operate in one of four ways:

- 18 two-operator FM channels
- 6 four-operator FM channels + 6 two-operator FM channels
- 15 two-operator FM channels + 5 FM drums
- 6 four-operator FM channels + 3 two-operator FM channels + 5 FM drums

Four-operator FM allows more complex sounds but reduces polyphony.

Eight waveforms are available for the FM synthesis:

- simple sine
- half sine
- absolute sine
- quarter sine (pseudo-sawtooth)
- alternating sine
- "camel" sine
- square
- logarithmic sawtooth

Unlike the OPL3, which has four channels for sound output, the OPL4 features six channels.

== Sample-based synthesis component ==
The sample synthesis part is based on pulse-code modulation (PCM). It features:

- Up to 24 simultaneous sounds (voices)
- Output sampling frequency of 44.1 kHz (it can also accept 22.05-kHz samples – they are up-sampled to 44.1 kHz before output)
- Waveform data lengths of 8, 12, or 16 bits
- Stereo output (with a 4-bit/16-level pan for each voice)

The PCM synthesizer part accepts:

- Up to 4 MB of external memory for wave data
- Up to 512 samples
- External ROM or SRAM memory. If SRAM is connected, then wave data can be downloaded from the OPL4.
- Chip select signals for 128 KB, 512 KB, 1 MB, or 2 MB memory can be output.

== Connectivity ==
For ROM wave data access, the Yamaha YRW801 2MB ROM chip can be connected to the OPL4. It holds approximately 330 samples, mostly 22.05-kHz 12-bit samples with some drums at 44.1 kHz. It is compatible with the General MIDI standard (128 melody sounds, 47 percussion sounds).

For sound effects, the OPL4 can be connected to the Yamaha YSS225 effects processor (EP), which adds various sound effects.

Like its predecessors, the OPL4 outputs audio in digital-I/O form, thus requiring an external DAC chip. For this reason, the OPL4 is used with the Yamaha YAC513 DAC chip, which was developed for the earlier OPL3 (YMF262) chip.

== Applications ==
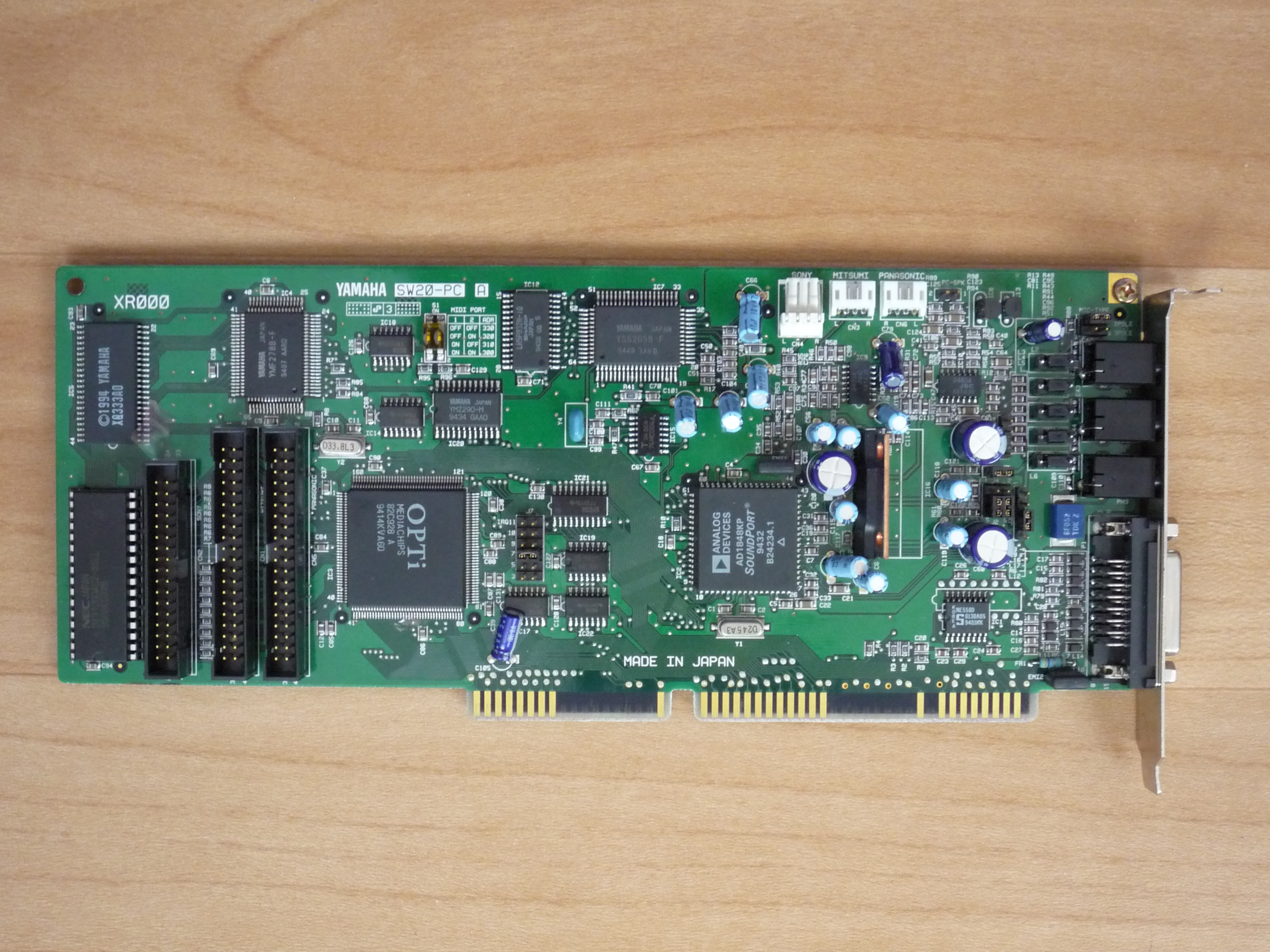
A YMF278B-F sound chip on a Yamaha Sound Edge SW20 PC card (near top left)

The YMF278 was used in the Moonsound sound card for the MSX as well as in Yamaha's Sound Edge sound card for IBM PC compatibles, both released in 1995.

== See also ==
- List of sound chips
- Yamaha OPL
