= Yamaha OPL =

Sound chip series by Yamaha

The Yamaha OPL (Operator Type-L) is a series of sound chips developed by Yamaha for low-cost frequency modulation (FM) synthesis in computers, musical instruments, and video games. OPL chips enabled the development of affordable sound cards for IBM PC compatible computers in the late 1980s, including the Ad Lib and Sound Blaster series. They became widely used in PC sound cards before being supplanted by cards using wavetable synthesis in the early 1990s.

== Internal operation ==
The internal operation of the chips is completely digital. Each FM-tone is generated by a digital oscillator using a form of direct digital synthesis. A low-frequency oscillator and an envelope generator drive an FM operator to produce floating-point output for the DAC. Decapsulation of the chips shows two look-up tables, one for calculating exponents and one for log-sine. This allows the FM operator to calculate its output without any multipliers, using the formula $\exp [\log \sin[\varphi_2 + \exp [\log \sin [\varphi_1] + A_1]] + A_2]$ and two 256-entry look-up tables. Both tables are stored as pairs of values rounded to the nearest whole number, with the second value represented as the difference between it and the first value.

A quarter of the log-transformed sine waveform is stored as a sampled approximation in a 256-word read-only memory (ROM) table, computed by $256\times -\log_2 \left(\sin\left(\frac{(x+0.5)\times\pi}{512}\right)\right)$ for values of 0 to 255. The rest of the sine-waveform is extrapolated via its property of symmetry. Scaling the output of an oscillator to a wanted volume would normally be done by multiplication, but the YM3526 avoids multiplications by operating on log-transformed signals, which reduces multiplications into computationally cheaper additions.

Another 256-word ROM stores the exponential function as a lookup table, used to convert the logarithmic scale signal back to linear scale when required, as the final stage where the oscillator-outputs are summed together (just prior to the DAC-output bus), with the modulator waveform always delayed by one sample before the carrier waveform. This table is computed by $\left(2^\frac{x}{256} -1\right)\times 1024$ for values of 0 to 255. To compute the exponent, 1024 is added to the value at the index given by the least significant byte of input; this becomes the significand and the remaining bits of input become the exponent of the floating point output.

== Chips in the series ==
=== OPL ===
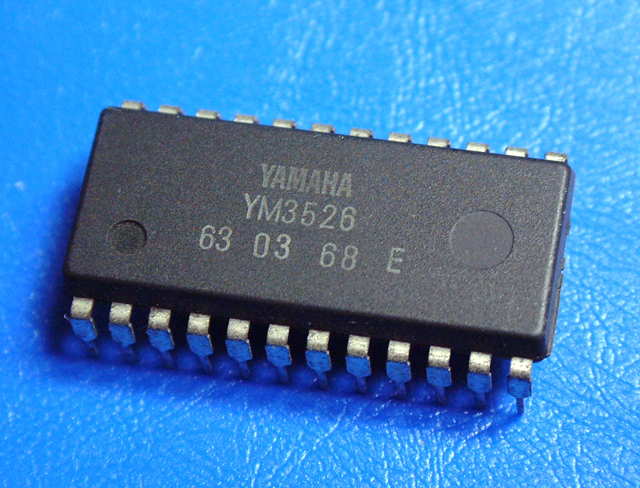
Yamaha YM3526

The YM3526, also known as OPL or OPL1, is the first chip in the OPL family. Introduced in 1984, it is a nine-channel, two-operator FM synthesis chip.

The YM3526 has 244 write-only registers and can produce nine melodic channels, each with two operators. Alternatively, it can use six melodic channels and five percussion instruments: bass drum, snare drum, tom, cymbal, and hi-hat. Each operator generates a sine wave and has its own ADSR envelope generator. The chip produces sounds primarily through frequency modulation, in which one operator modulates the phase of another.

The YM3526 generates digital audio samples at 49.716 kHz and sends them to an external digital-to-analog converter (DAC), the YM3014B, for conversion to an analog signal. The YM3014B was also used with other Yamaha FM chips, including the YM2151 and YM2203.

The Y8950, also known as MSX-AUDIO, is closely related to the YM3526 and was used in MSX audio expansion hardware. It adds ADPCM recording and playback capabilities.

Overview of a channel's registers:

For the whole channel:

- Main frequency (10 bits)
- Octave (3 bits)
- Note on/off
- Synthesis mode (FM or just additive)
- Feedback (0–7, the modulator modulating itself)

For each one of the two oscillators:

- Frequency multiply (can be set to 1/2, 1 to 10, 12 or 15)
- Waveform (Sine)
- Volume (0–63, logarithmic)
- Attack, decay, sustain, release (4 bits each, logarithmic)
- Tremolo (on or off)
- Vibrato (on or off)
- Sustain (on or off)
- Envelope scaling per key (on or off)
- Volume scaling per key (0–3)

There are also a few parameters that can be set for the whole chip:

- Vibrato depth
- Tremolo depth
- Percussion mode (uses 3 channels to provide 5 percussion sounds)
- Composite sine mode (see Oscillator sync)

=== OPL2 ===
An audio sample of music written for and played on YM3812

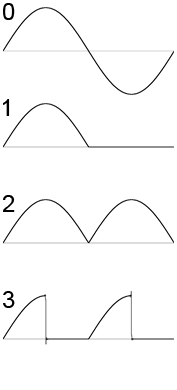
OPL2 waveforms

The YM3812, also known as OPL2, is the second chip in the OPL family. Introduced in 1985, it is an improved version of the YM3526, and was backwards compatible with the former alongside its variant, the Y8950.

Among its newly-added features is the ability to pick between four waveforms for each individual oscillator by setting a register. In addition to the original sine wave, three modified waveforms can be produced: half-sine waves (where the negative part of the sine is muted), absolute-sine waves (where the negative part is inverted), and pseudo-sawtooth waves (quarter sine waves upward only with silent sections in between). This odd way of producing waveforms give the YM3812 a characteristic sound.

Limited to two-operator FM synthesis, the YM3812 is unable to accurately reproduce timbres of real instruments and percussive sounds unlike other FM chips. Melody polyphony is limited to nine voices in melodic mode and six voices in percussive mode. The YM3812 is used with an external YM3014B monophonic DAC chip to output its audio in analog form, like with the YM3526.

Having little competition on the market at the time of introduction of Adlib and Sound Blaster in the late 1980s, the chip became the de-facto standard for "Sound Blaster compatible" sound cards.

Another related chip is the YM2413 (OPLL), which is a cut down version of the YM3812.

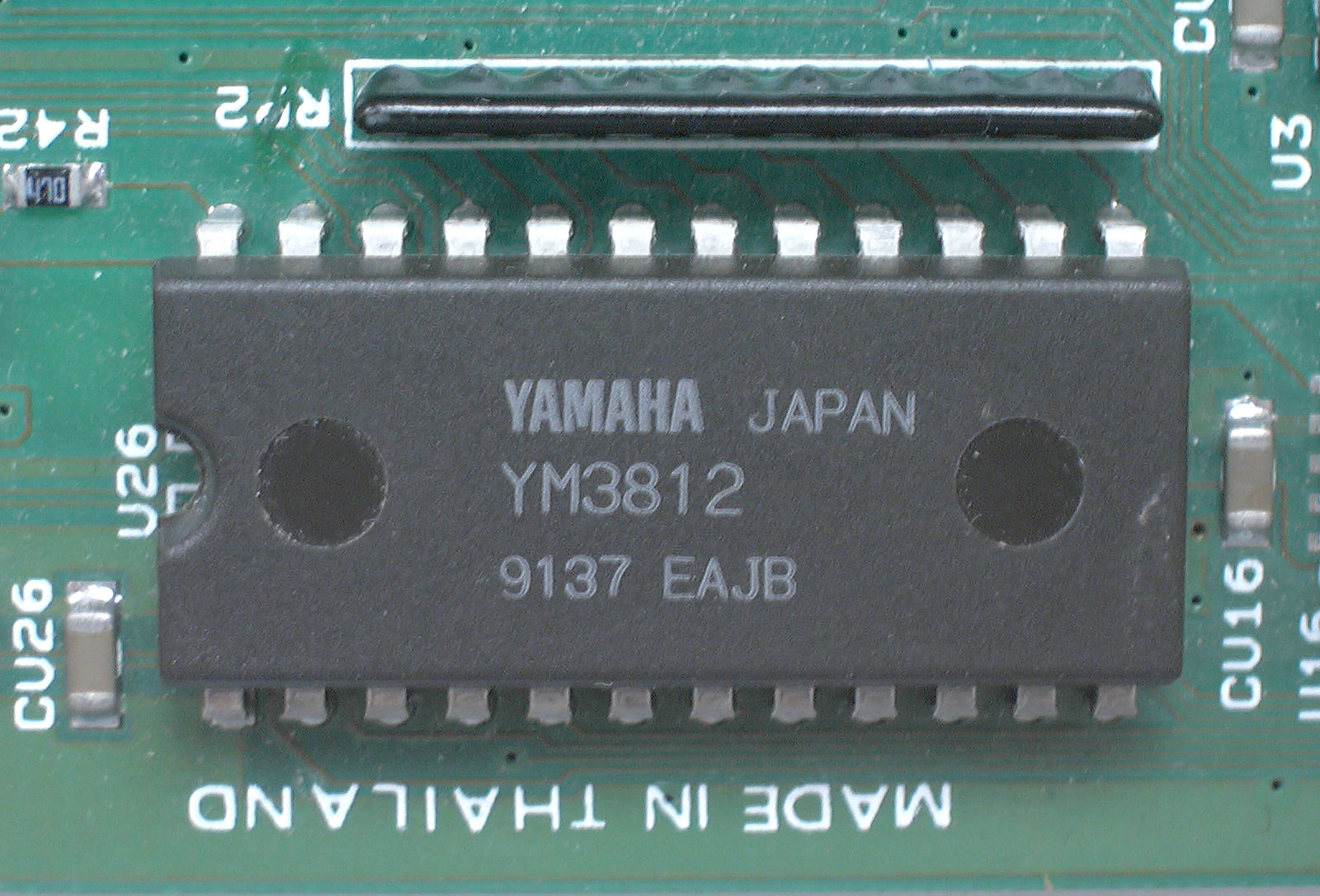
Yamaha YM3812 (OPL2 chip)

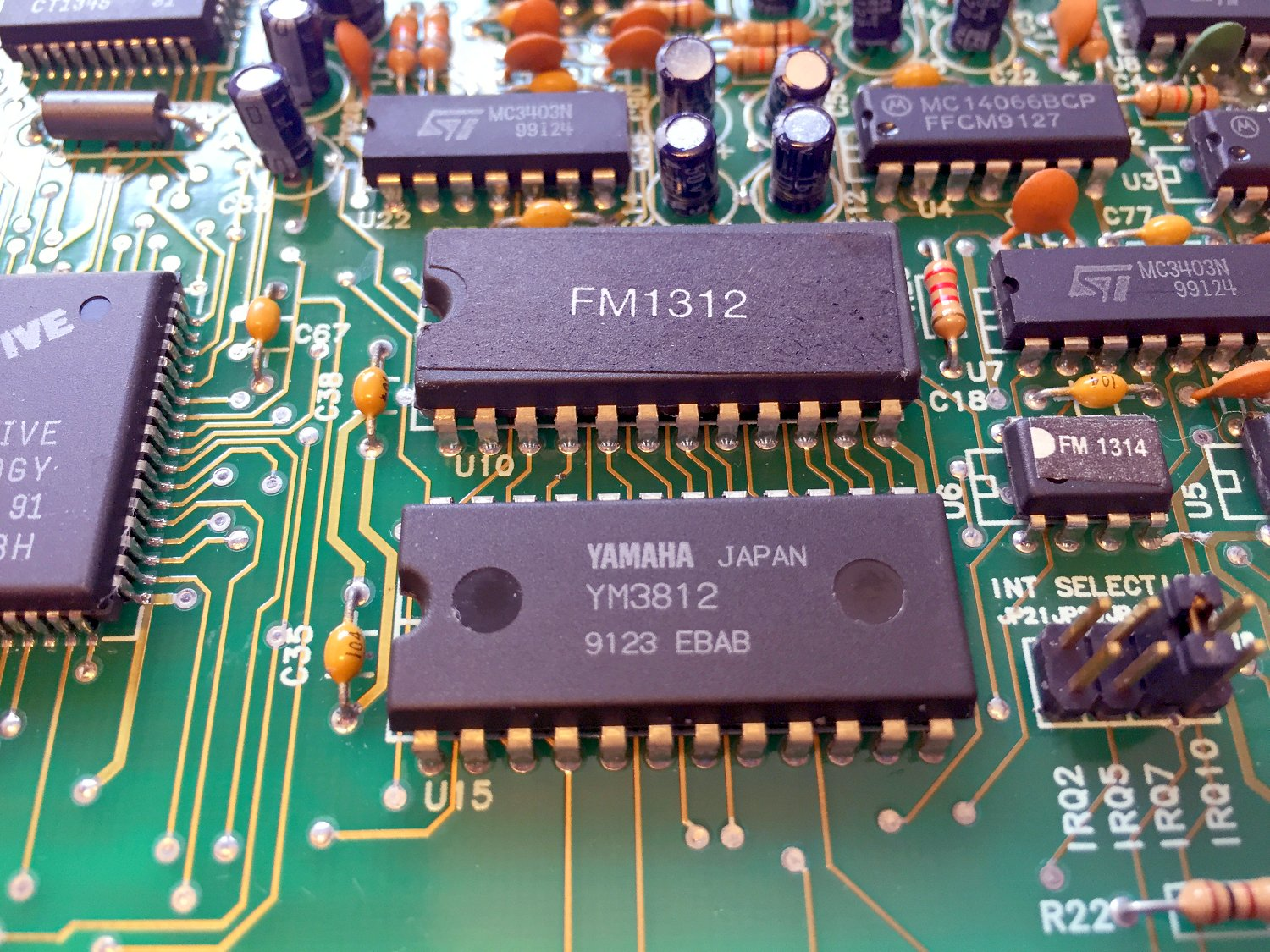
Creative Labs and other companies often hid the original Yamaha labels

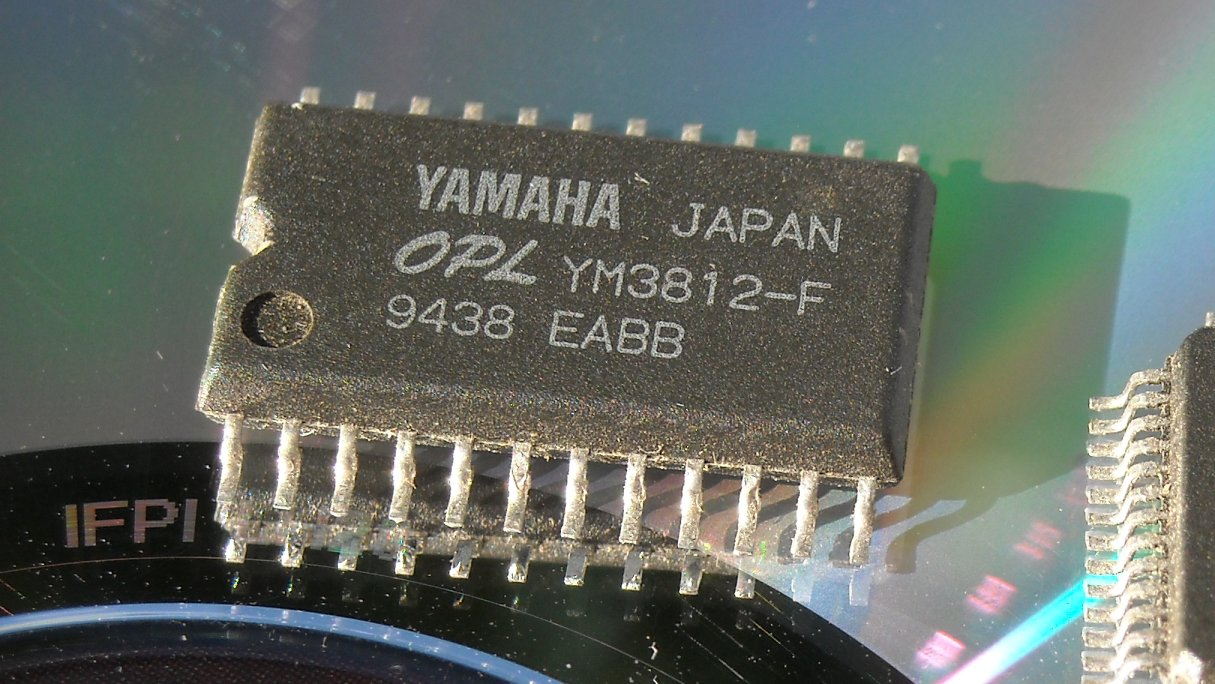
Yamaha YM3812-F SMD (surface mount OPL2 chip)

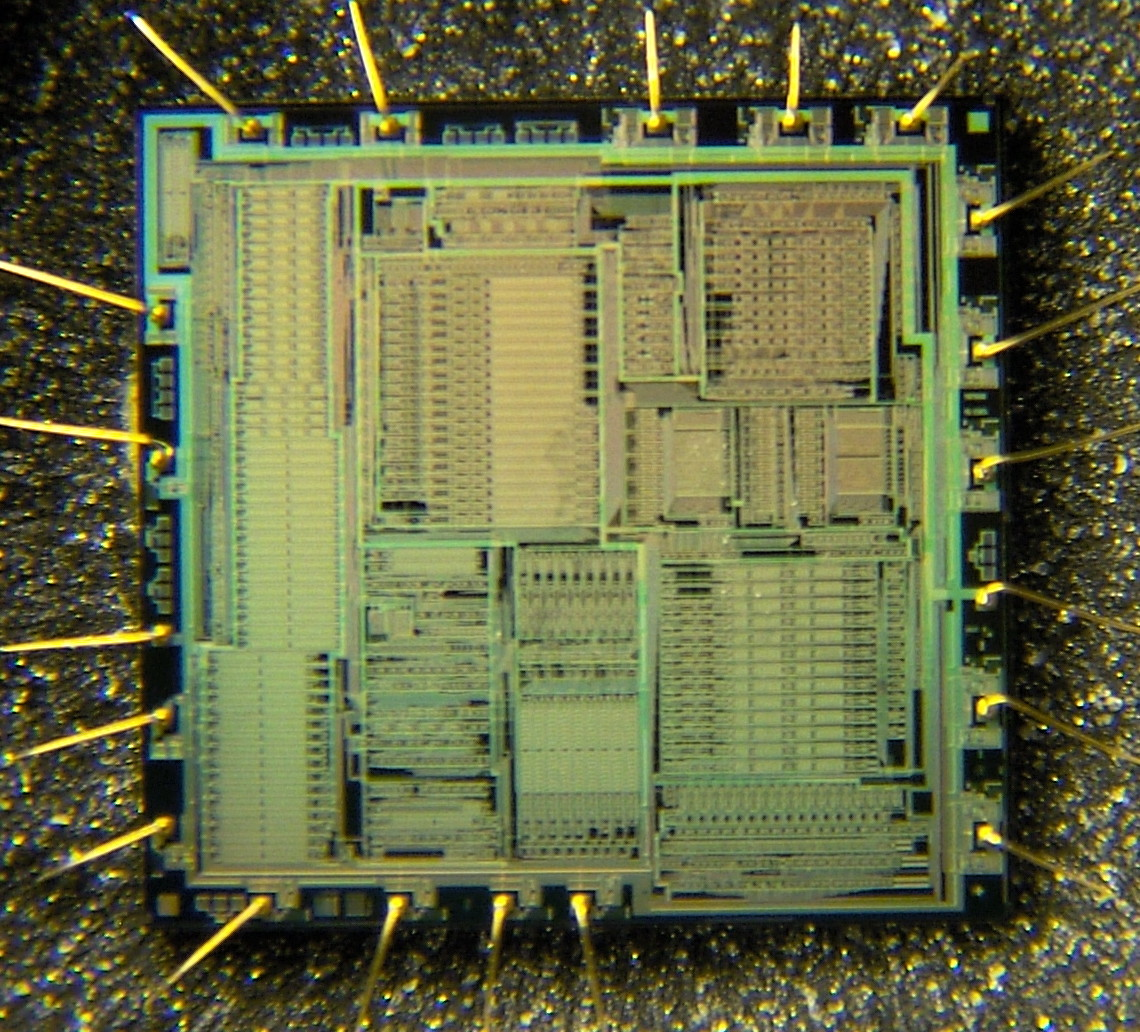
Decapsulated YM3812, showing the die surface

=== OPL3 ===
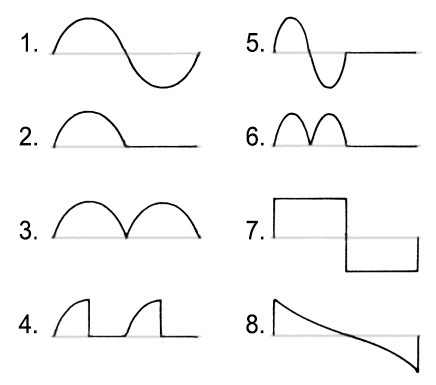
OPL3 waveforms

The YMF262, also known as OPL3, is the third chip in the OPL family. Introduced in 1990, (Note: Many sources claim that the YMF262 (OPL3) was released in 1988, however this is erroneous, as this relates to the copyright year printed on the reference manual of the chips.) it is an upgraded version of the YM3812, which improves on the feature-set of its predecessor while also notably including the ability to use four-operator FM synthesis. This makes the YMF262 produce more harmonically richer sound than that of its predecessors, similar to contemporary consumer synthesizer keyboards of the time such as the Yamaha DX100.

The following features were added:

- twice as many channels (18 instead of 9)
- simple stereo (hard left, center or hard right)
- 4 channel sound output
- 4 new waveforms (alternating-sine, "camel"-sine, square and logarithmic sawtooth)
- 4 operator mode, pairing 2 channels together to create up to six 4 operator FM voices
- reduced latency for host-register access (the OPL2 had much longer I/O access delays)
- subtle differences in the sine-wave lookup table and envelope generator to YM3812 (e.g. the modulator waveform on YM3812 is delayed by one sample, whereas both carrier and modulator waveforms on OPL3 are properly synchronized)

The YMF262's FM synthesis mode can be configured in different ways:

- Its basic mode provides 18 two-operator FM channels.
- One setting, common with the rest of the OPL line, converts 3 of the FM channels into a 5-channel percussion set.
- Another setting, introduced with this chip, causes 12 of the channels to be paired up into six four-operator channels. It allows two channels with two operators to be combined into one single channel with four operators, which trades in polyphony for more complex sound formation. About four possible algorithms can be used in this mode for each of the four-operator channels.
- These two settings above can be used separately or in conjunction, resulting in four total modes:
  - 18 2-operator channels
  - 15 2-operator channels + 5 drum channels (drum setting on)
  - 6 2-operator channels + 6 4-operator channels (4-op setting on)
  - 3 2-operator channels + 6 4-operator channels + 5 drum channels (both settings on)

The YMF262 also removed support for the seldom-used CSM (Composite sine mode) mode that was present on the YM3526 and YM3812, which was equivalent to triggering multiple channels simultaneously. Like its predecessors, the OPL3 outputs audio in digital form, requiring an external DAC chip such as the specially-made YAC512.

The YMF262 was used in the revised Sound Blaster Pro, Sound Blaster 16, AdLib Gold, Media Vision’s Pro AudioSpectrum cards, and Microsoft’s Windows Sound System cards. Competing sound chip vendors (such as ESS, OPTi, Crystal and others) have also designed their own OPL3-compatible audio chips, with varying degrees of faithfulness to the original OPL3.

Yamaha YMF262 (OPL3 chip, manuf. year 1995)

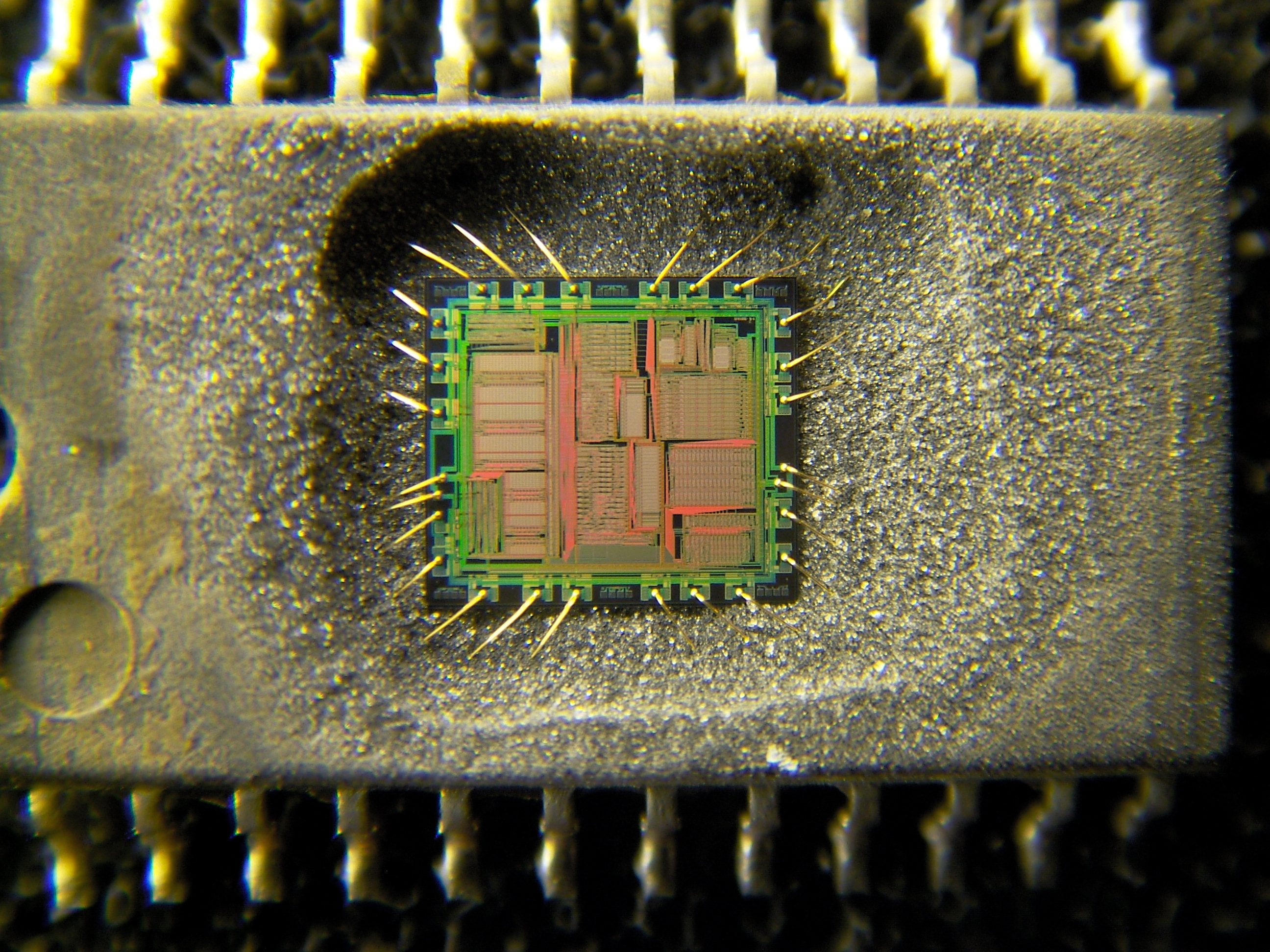
Decapsulated YMF262, showing the die surface

==== Yamaha YMF289 ====
A comparison of the outputs of Yamaha's YMF262 and YMF289 FM sound chips. 0:00 is YMF262, and 0:31 onward is YMF289.

The YMF289, also known as OPL3-L, is a fully compatible, low-power variant of the YMF262 released in 1995, targeting PCMCIA sound cards and laptop computers. It was also used in some Sound Blaster 16 sound cards made by Creative Technology.

The YMF289 is fully register-compatible with and retains the feature-set of the YMF262, with a number of differences:

- Supports 5 or 3.3 volt operation.
- The registers can be read or written by the host CPU, whereas on the YMF262 they are write-only.
- 44,100 Hz (44.1 kHz) output sample rate.
- A power-down mode is added.
- Somewhat smaller overall footprint, including DAC, compared to a full YMF262 implementation.
- 33.868 MHz input clock, compared to the 14.32 MHz input clock used for the YMF262.
- Internal linear interpolator.

The YMF289B is paired with a YAC513 or YAC516 companion floating-point DAC chip, like the YMF262.

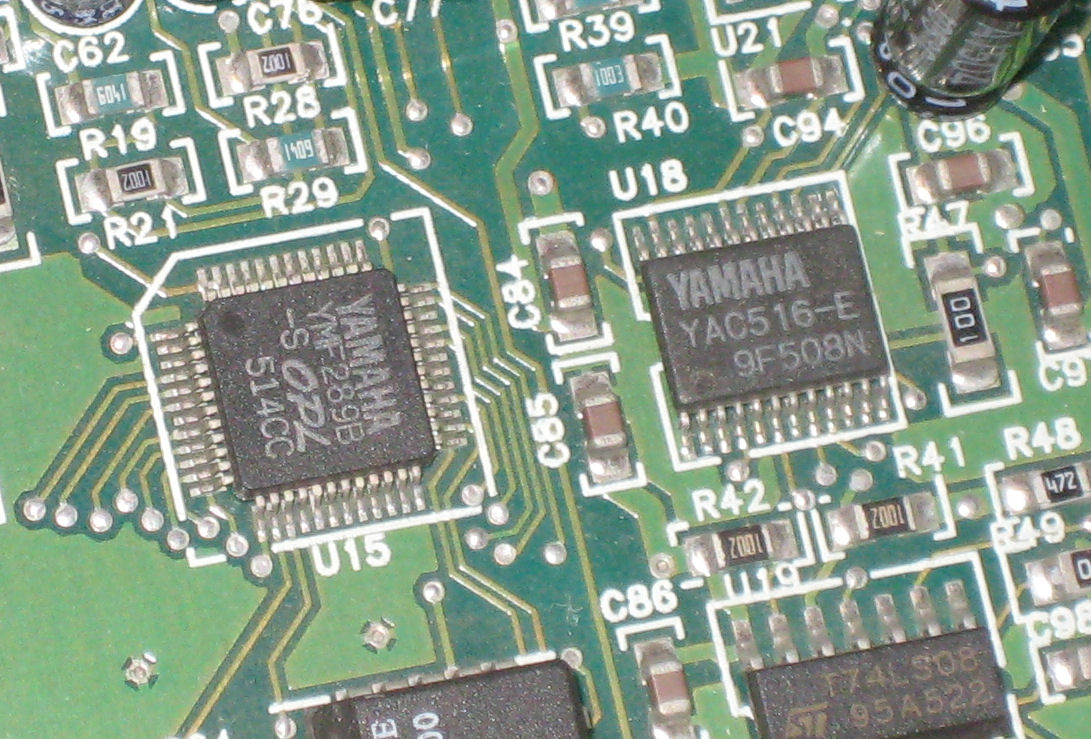
Yamaha YMF289B and companion YAC516 DAC

==== ESS ESFM ====
ESFM's output under Legacy / OPL3-compatible mode demonstrates some tangible differences in the way some sounds are synthesized.

ESS Technology's in-house developed derivative, termed ESFM, is an enhanced 72-operator OPL3-compatible clone incorporating two operating modes, a Native mode and a Legacy mode, which controls its feature-set and behavior. In Native mode, ESFM allows 18 4-operator FM voices to be mapped, each with per-operator frequency control and LFO depth, potentially allowing for a significant increase in the complexity of tones generated. The drivers for Windows 9x incorporate their own custom instrument patches which make use of this extended mode. Conversely, Legacy mode provides full backward-compatibility with Yamaha's YMF262. ESFM's output in this mode is moderately faithful to the YMF262 overall, but some tones are rendered quite differently, resulting in unique distortions in the sound and music of some games.

ESFM is available in ESS sound chips starting with the ISA-based ES1688 AudioDrive, up to the PCI-based ES1946 Solo-1E, whereas earlier chips required an external FM synthesizer chip (typically a Yamaha YMF262). ESS's Maestro series of PCI-based sound chips rely on a software implementation of FM synthesis that lacks ESFM's special features.

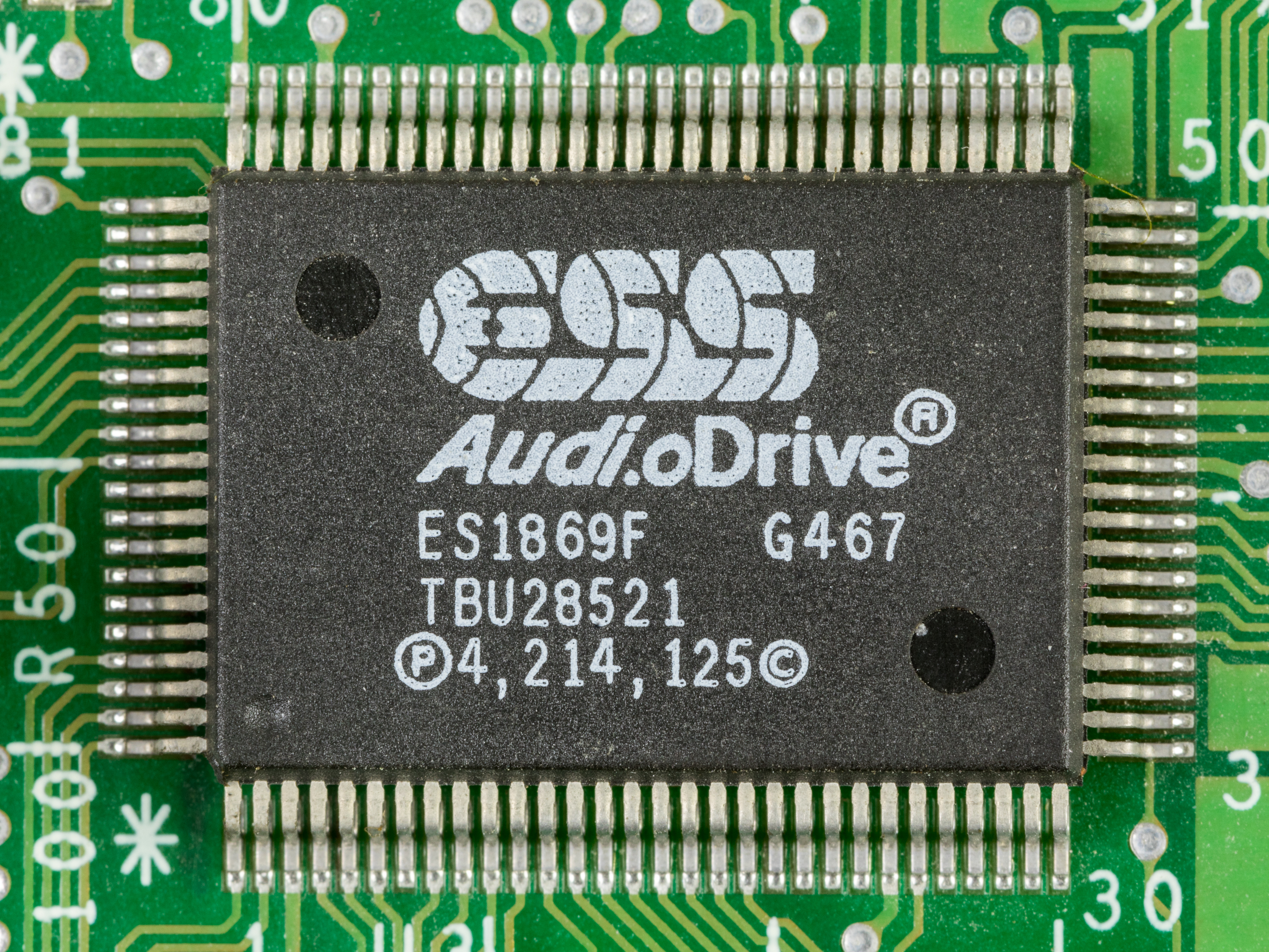
The ES1869F is one of several ESS-developed sound chips which incorporate their unique ESFM function.

=== OPL3-SA, DS-XG, OPL4 ===
Yamaha's later PC audio controllers, including the YMF278 (OPL4), the single-chip Yamaha YMF718/719S, and the PCI YMF724/74x family, included the YMF262's FM synthesis block for backward compatibility with legacy software. See YMF7xx for more information.

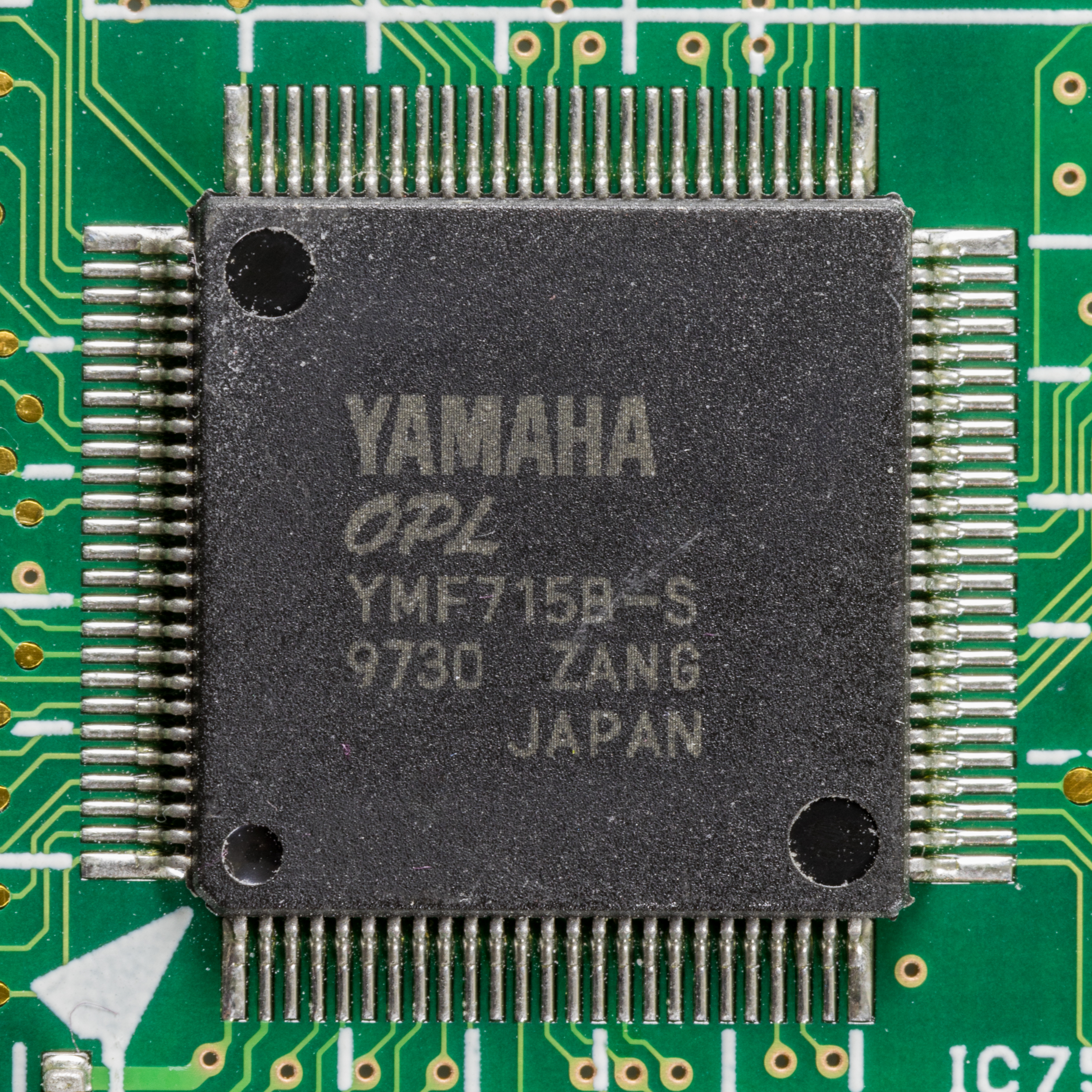
Yamaha OPL YMF715B-S chipset

== Products using the OPL series ==
The YM3526 was notably used in a Commodore 64 expansion, the Sound Expander, as well as several arcade games, such as Terra Cresta and Bubble Bobble. A modified version of the YM3526 with ADPCM audio known as the Y8950 (MSX-AUDIO) was used in the MSX computer as an optional expansion.

The YM3812 saw wide use in IBM PC-based sound cards such as the AdLib, Sound Blaster and Pro AudioSpectrum (8bit), as well as several arcade games by Nichibutsu, Toaplan and others.

The YM2413 was used in the FM Sound Unit expansion for the Sega Mark III and the Japanese model Sega Master System, as well as the MSX-MUSIC standard, which was released both as separate enhancement cards (such as the Panasonic FM-PAC) and built-in into several MSX2+ and the MSX TurboR computers. It was also used in some arcade games by Atari, SNK and Alpha Denshi, among others.

The YMF262 was used in many IBM PC-based sound cards, firstly with the popular Sound Blaster Pro 2 in 1991 and then later with the Sound Blaster 16 ASP in 1992, as well as the Pro AudioSpectrum (16bit). Later models of the Sound Blaster 16 and Sound Blaster AWE series integrated the OPL3 with other chips, with Creative Labs using an OPL3 clone chip, the CQM, integral with other chips in later models from late 1995. It is also used in several arcade games by Tecmo and others.

The YMF278 was used in the Moonsound card for the MSX, as well as the Sound Edge card by Yamaha for IBM PC compatibles.

=== Synthesizers ===
Synthesizers that use the YM3812:

- Yamaha PSR-11 49-keys 16-sounds (1986)
- Yamaha PSR-12 49-keys 32-sounds (1987)
- Yamaha PSR-21 49-keys 16-sounds, 2 steps sliders (1986)
- Yamaha PSR-22 49-keys 32-sounds, 2 steps sliders (1987)
- Yamaha PSR-31 61-keys 16-sounds, additional YM3301 chip for drums (1986)
- Yamaha PSR-32 61-keys 32-sounds, additional YM3301 chip for drums (1987)
- Yamaha PSS-360 49 mini-keys 21-sounds, 5 steps sliders, low-cost mono version of PSS-460 (1986)
- Yamaha PSS-460 49 mini-keys 21-sounds, 5 steps sliders (1986)
- Yamaha PSS-470 49 mini-keys 21-sounds, 5 steps sliders (1987)
- Yamaha PSS-560 49 mini-keys 21-sounds, 5 steps sliders, additional YM3301 chip for drums (1986)
- Yamaha PSS-570 49 mini-keys 21-sounds, 5 steps sliders, additional YM3301 chip for drums (1987)

Synthesizers that use the YM2413 (cost reduced YM3812):

- Yamaha PSR-6 49-keys 100-sounds (1994)
- Yamaha PSS-140 37 mini-keys 100-sounds (1988); the PSS-140 actually uses the YM2420, a slightly modified variant of the YM2413 with different registers
- Yamaha PSS-170 44 mini-keys 100-sounds (1986)
- Yamaha PSS-270 49 mini-keys 100-sounds (1986)

== Variants and derivatives ==
An open-source RTL implementation of the OPL3 was written in SystemVerilog and adapted to an FPGA in 2015.

== See also ==
- VGM – an audio file format for multiple video game platforms
- List of sound chips
- List of Yamaha products
- Yamaha Y8950
- Yamaha YM2413
- Yamaha YMF278
- Yamaha OPN
