= Moonsound =

Sound card for the MSX

Moonsound is a sound card for the MSX home-computer system. It was produced by the Netherlands-based Sunrise Swiss in 1995. It was named for its accompanying Moonblaster software that was written to take advantage of the sound card's features.

== History ==
Moonsound was created and designed by electronic engineer Henrik Gilvad on a semi-hobby basis. It was unveiled at the Tilburg Computer Fair in 1995, two years after Microsoft abandoned the MSX platform in 1993 in favor of IBM PC compatible platforms.

At least two generations of the Moonsound were made. The first version consisted of a small-sized PCB without a protective shell. A later version with a larger-sized PCB that fitted into a standard MSX cartridge was also made available.

The Moonsound has also been emulated in MSX emulators such as blueMSX and openMSX.

== Specifications ==
Based on the Yamaha YMF278 (OPL4) sound chip, it is capable of 18 channels of FM synthesis as well as 24 channels of 12 and 16 bit sample-based synthesis. The FM registers of the Moonsound are compatible with the OPL (sometimes referred to as "OPL1"), OPL2, OPLL and OPL3 chips (the MSX-AUDIO also contains a chip that is similar to and also compatible with the OPL). Therefore, some older software can make use of the Moonsound's FM portion.

The Moonsound was equipped with one 128 KB SRAM chip from the factory for use with compressed user samples. Later versions also had room for two sample SRAM chips resulting in 1 MB of compressed user samples. Moonsound version 1.0 only had one socket for user sample RAM, while Moonsound version 1.1 and 1.2 had two sockets for up to 1 MB SRAM. Some hackers and modders have figured out how to stack two additional SRAM chips on top of the existing ones, resulting in a maximum of 2 MB of SRAM.

The 2 MB ROM contained 330 mono samples, mostly at 22.05 kHz at 12 bits, but with some drums at 44.1 kHz. A 2 MB instrument ROM containing multisampled instruments was considered unusual for its time.

The FM part of the OPL4 chip can be configured in several ways:

- 18 two-operator FM channels
- 6 four-operator FM channels + 6 two-operator FM channels
- 15 two-operator FM channels + 5 FM drums
- 6 four-operator FM channels + 3 two-operator FM channels + 5 FM drums

Four-operator FM allows for more complex sounds but reduces polyphony.

Eight waveforms are available for the FM synthesis portion:

- Sine
- Half-sine
- Absolute-sine
- Quarter-sine (pseudo-sawtooth)
- Alternaing-sine
- "Camel" sine
- Square
- Logarithmic sawtooth

The Moonsound audio's power supply is isolated from its digital supply in an attempt to reduce noise. The Moonsound is not mixed with the internal MSX sound; instead, it uses a separate stereo audio output to produce the audio from the sound card.

=== Sound effects ===
Sound effects like chorus, delay and reverb are omitted due to cost, size and usability reasons. The Yamaha effect chip requires its own specialised memory and effect routing is basic. All 18 FM channels and 24 channels of sample-based sound shares the same effect setting. Creative step-time sequencer programmers made pseudo effects like chorus, reverb and delay by overdubbing or using dedicated channels to repeat notes with delay and stereo panning. This is effective but quickly reduces the musical complexity possible.

== Software ==
As most developers were active in gaming software, many game companies such as Sunrise (in the Netherlands) developed and composed music specifically for Moonsound.

List of software for the Moonsound:

- Moonblaster (see below)
  - Moonblaster for Moonsound FM
  - Moonblaster for Moonsound Wave
- Moonsofts Amiga MOD file player for Moonsound
- Mid2opl4 midi file player for Moonsound
- Meridian SMF MIDI file player
- MoonDriver MML (Music Macro Language) compiler

Additional software tools were able to rip sound loops digitally from audio CDs inserted in a CD-ROM drive connected to any of the SCSI and ATA-IDE interfaces. These programs were also developed and designed by Henrik Gilvad for MSX Club Gouda and Sunrise Swiss.

=== Moonblaster ===
Moonblaster is a software designed by Remco Schrijvers based on his time-step sequencer software for other MSX sound cards. Later on, Marcel Delorme took over the software development for Moonblaster. It was designed for use with the Moonsound, of which its name is inspired directly from the program itself. It came with two separate programs, one for FM and one for sample-based synthesis.

== See also ==
- Chiptune
