= OpenMSX =

openMSX
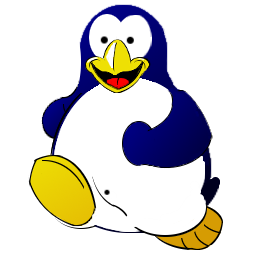
- Developer: openMSX Team
- Release: March 25, 2002; 24 years ago
- Stable release: 22.0 / October 28, 2026; 0 days ago
- Written in: C++ (core), Tcl, (openmsx-catapult: wxWidgets)
- Operating system: POSIX and Windows
- Type: Emulator
- License: GNU GPLv2
- Website: openmsx.org
- Repository: github.com/openMSX/openMSX

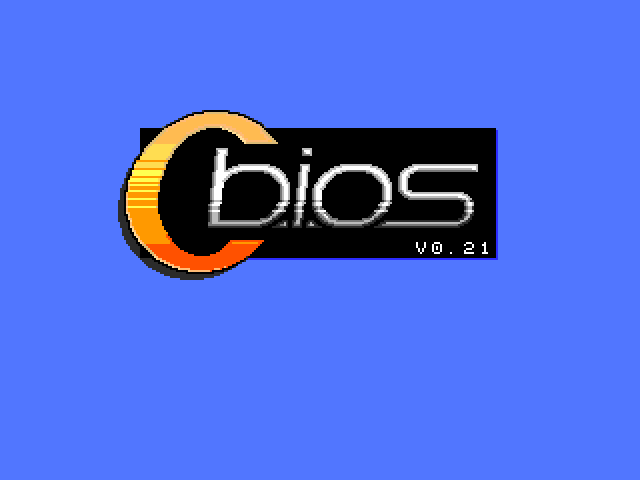
openMSX running CBIOS

openMSX is a free software emulator for the MSX architecture. It is available for multiple platforms, including Microsoft Windows and POSIX systems such as Linux.

For copyright reasons, the emulator cannot be distributed with original MSX-BIOS ROM images. Instead, openMSX includes C-BIOS, a minimal implementation of the MSX BIOS, allowing some games to be played without the original ROM image. It is possible for the user to replace C-BIOS by native BIOS if they prefer.

openMSX emulates a large amount of MSX systems and MSX-related hardware, including:

- MSX TurboR
- Moonsound
- IDE Controller by Sunrise
- GFX9000
- Pioneer Palcom LaserDisc

openMSX also emulates the SV-318/SV-328 computers, the ColecoVision and the Sega SG-1000.

Notable features include:

- Scalers
- Debugging including visual debugging of graphics
- Tcl Script Support
- Cheat Finder
- Game Trainers
- Audio/Video recording
- Reverse support (go back in emulated time to correct mistakes or debug what happened)

openMSX has an open communication protocol to communicate with the openMSX emulator. Utilizing this communication protocol enables to write versatile add-ons for openMSX. Projects making use of this protocol include the following applications:

- openMSX Catapult (by the openMSX team; obsoleted by the new graphical user interface introduced with openMSX 20.0)
- openMSX Debugger (by the openMSX team; obsoleted by the built-in debugger introduced with openMSX 20.0))
- openMSXControl plugin
- NekoLauncher openMSX
- openMSX Peashooter
- openMSX Control Plugin for Gedit

There is a dead subproject to redevelop Catapult, a GUI developed for the emulator that is part of the project, utilizing Python and the Qt toolkit.

The separate openMSX Debugger, written in C++ and utilizing the Qt Toolkit is not in development anymore, as efforts are now focused on the built-in debugger.

As of release 20.0, a GUI was integrated that replaces almost all functionality of the Catapult and separate Debugger programs. Both these sub-projects will not be developed further, in favour of the built-in functionality. The new GUI uses the Dear ImGUI toolkit.

== Sources ==
- Project Homepage
- Project Forum
- C-BIOS Compatibility Page
- openMSX 0.5.1 review (2005)
- NekoLauncher openMSX
- openMSX Peashooter
- openMSX Control Plugin for Gedit
