= Windows Sound System =

Sound card standard

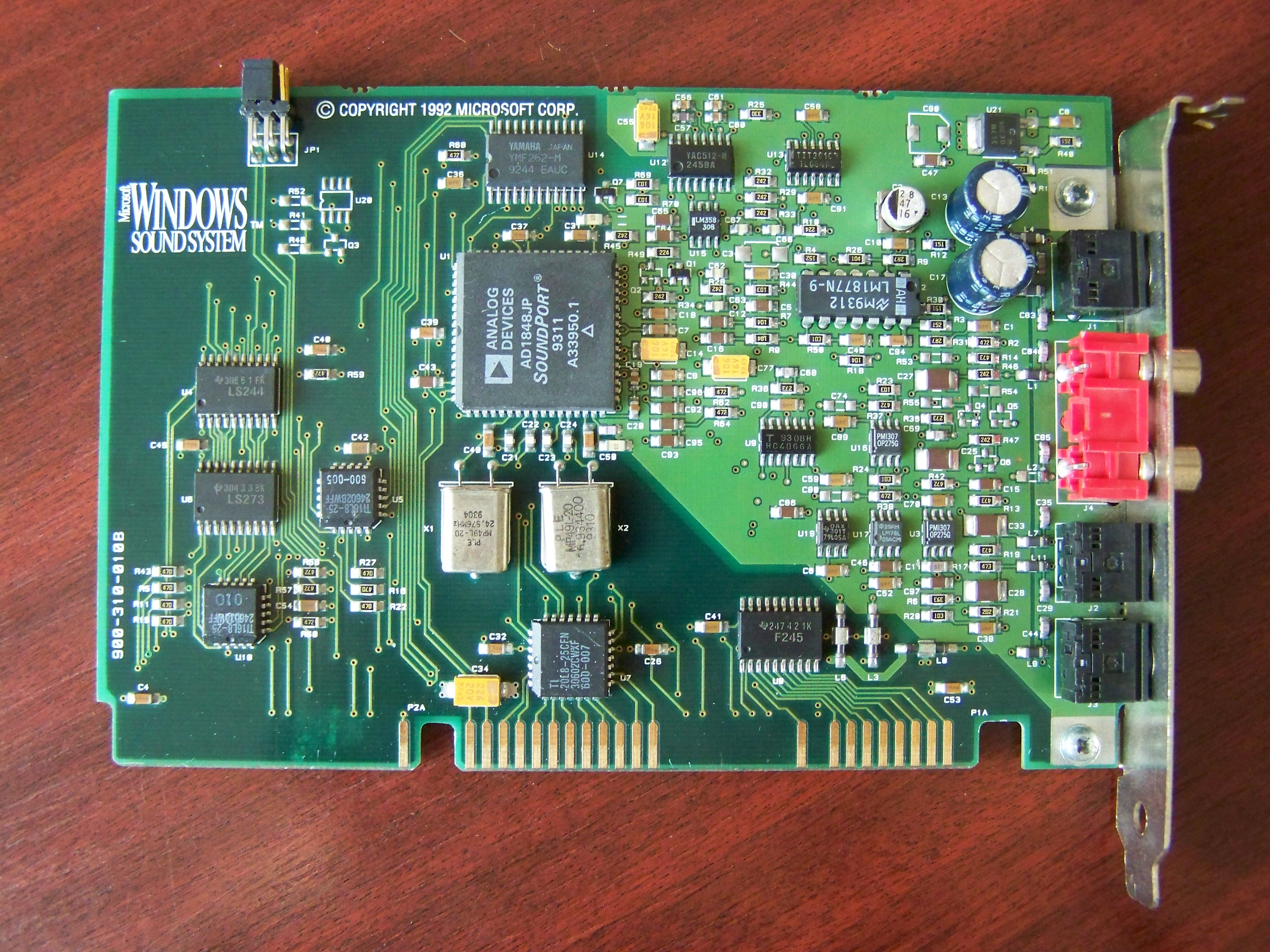
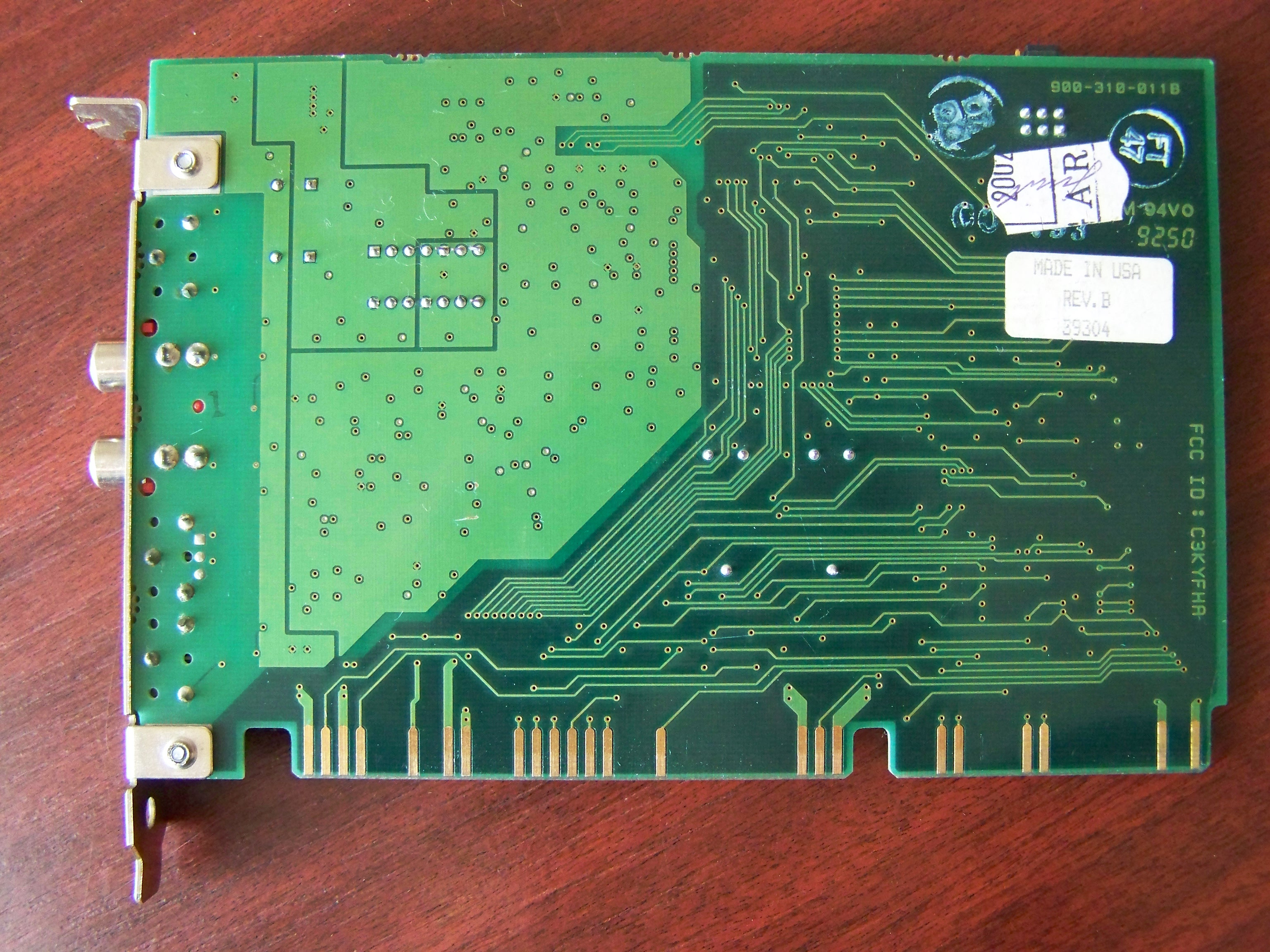
Front and back of an original Microsoft Windows Sound System sound card

Windows Sound System (WSS) is a sound card specification developed by Microsoft, released at the end of 1992 for Windows 3.1. It was sold as a bundle which included an ISA sound card, a microphone, a pair of headphones and a software package.

WSS featured support for up to 16-bit, 48 kHz digital sampling, beyond the capabilities of the popular Sound Blaster Pro, although it was less frequently supported than Sound Blaster and Gravis sound cards, as well as Roland sound cards, daughterboards, and sound modules. In addition, the WSS featured RCA analog audio outputs, an uncommon feature among sound cards of this era; other connections were a microphone input, a stereo line input and a stereo headphone output.

WSS was supported by most popular DOS sound libraries developed in the 1990s, such as the Miles Sound System and HMI Sound Operating System, as well as less popular ones such as Loudness Sound System, Digital Sound Interface Kit, Digital Sound & Music Interface and Junglevision Sound Drive.

Much like with the Intel High Definition Audio standard of today, the actual hardware was also standardized as well. WSS was based on the Analog Devices AD1848 codec chip and had an on-board Yamaha YMF262-M (OPL3) FM synthesis sound chip for MIDI playback (supporting up to 18 simultaneous 2-op voices or up to 12 simultaneous 4-op voices and 12 simultaneous 2-op voices in 4-op mode).

== Drivers ==
WSS 1.0a drivers were released in February 1993. They introduced single-mode DMA, supported games in MS-DOS, Ad Lib and Sound Blaster emulation.

WSS 2.0 drivers, released in October 1993, added support for OEM sound cards (Media Vision, Creative Labs, ESS Technology) and included an improved DOS driver (WSSXLAT.EXE) that provided Sound Blaster 16 compatibility for digital sampling; however, they did not provide support for FM or "wavetable synthesis".
