= Crisis Force =

1991 video game

- Cover art by Takashi Yamasaki
- Developer: Konami
- Publisher: Konami
- Designers: Fumimasa Katakami; Masaaki Kishimoto
- Programmers: Makoto Yamaguchi; Toshinori Shimono
- Composers: Jun Chuma; Kenichi Matsubara; Yasuhiko Manno
- Platform: Family Computer
- Release: JP: August 27, 1991
- Genre: Vertically scrolling shooter
- Modes: Single-player, multiplayer

Crisis Force (Note: Japanese: クライシスフォース) is a 1991 vertically scrolling shooter video game developed and published by Konami for the Family Computer. It was only released in Japan. The player controls one of two fighter ships piloted by Asuka and Maya, a pair of twin siblings descended from the ancient civilizations of Mu, who must save the world from a breed of artificial monsters from the lost civilization of Atlantis. The main feature of the game system is the player's ability to transform its ship in one of three different forms, each with its unique attack method.

== Gameplay ==
Crisis Force is an overhead scrolling shooting game. The game allows for two player co-operative play, and to choose from four different ships.

Crisis Force features a power up system built around your craft being able to transform into one of three configurations.

The main feature of Crisis Force is the player's ability to alter the form of their ship and change its attack method. The Aurawing has three primary forms, the "Front Offense Type", which specializes in shooting enemies in front of the ship, the "Side Offense Type", which focuses on attacking the left and right sides at the same time, and the "Rear Offense Type", which focuses on shooting from behind. Each mode has a "normal power-up" (blue orbs) and a "special power-up" (red orbs) that can be obtained from defeating enemies or destroying power-up containers. The "normal" and "special" power-ups changes the shooting style of each mode and can be upgraded by up to three levels. Power-up levels are carried over to the ship's different forms and when the player takes damage, its power-up level is reduced by one level with each shot until it is destroyed (causing the player to lose one ship).

There are also "combination parts" that can be accumulated that causes the player's ship to transform into a new form or combine with the other player's ship depending on the number of players. When union parts have been collected, the player's ship (along with that of the other player's) will change into a combined form for a limited time period. The player who has collected the most parts will control the combined ship's main shot, while the other player (the one with the fewer parts collected) controls the secondary weapon. When the timer runs out or the combined ship takes enough damage, the player's ship will revert to its regular state (along with that of the other player's).

Other power-ups available from item containers included bombs for the player's ship (up to nine units can be carried), as well as speed-ups and speed-downs that adjust the player's speed by up to five levels. The bombs launched by the player's ship varies depending on its form.

The game's difficulty, default number of lives and controls can be adjusted on the game's option screen, which features a sound test as well.

== Plot ==
Asuka and Maya are typical high-school students living in Tokyo. Even though their parents were archaeologists, they lived a rather mundane life.

But then one day, the same ominous dream that the two siblings were having lately suddenly became a reality. The seven monsters that sunk down the land of Atlantis and destroyed most of the ancient civilizations 10,000 years ago has suddenly revived.

Modern weapons were no use against the strange weapons of Atlantis. The entire world was engulfed in the flames of war and it did not take long for the hands of evil to reach Japan. Asuka and Maya's parents, who were caught in an attack, revealed the truth to their children during their dying moment—they were not Asuka and Maya's true parents. During an archaeological trip on a deserted island 17 years ago, the couple discovered an Aurawing, an aircraft built by the ancient Mu civilization. Inside the aircraft there was a life-support system containing a pair of infants. Indeed, Asuka and Maya were actually the children of a brave warrior from Mu who fought against Atlantis 10,000 years ago.

Asuka and Maya, now awakened to their true destiny, are the only hope mankind has against Atlantis. The siblings board on their respective Aurawing ships, each possessing a mystical power, as they fly off to a continent shrouded in dark clouds.

== Development and release ==
The late 1980s and early 1990s was the peak of popularity for the shooting game genre, and Crisis Force was released around the same time as titles like Gunhed, Seirei Senshi Spriggan, Soldier Blade, and Axelay.

The three composers for the game were part of Konami Kukeiha Club, and were also working on music for the arcade game Lightning Fighters.

As Konami's final shooting game for the Famicom, the game was developed to push the hardware's specifications to its limits and utilized Konami's custom VRC4 chip (previously used for the Famicom version of Gradius II) to allow for four-way scrolling and large bosses. However, because of the game's late release during the Famicom's lifespan, a year after the launch of its successor the Super Famicom, Crisis Force did not achieve the popularity that Konami expected.

The game features parallax scrolling.

The game was released on August 27, 1991 in Japan for the Famicom. The game was never released outside of Japan.

The game's music was composed by Ken-ichi Matsubara, a former member of the Konami Kukeiha Club who worked on Castlevania II: Simon's Quest and Contra Force. The soundtrack was included in the Konami Shooting Collection CD box set released on September 22, 2011.

The game received its first re-release in 2026 as a hidden unlockable in the Ganbare Goemon! Daishūgō compilation.

== Reception and legacy ==
Reception

Review scores
| Publication | Score |
|---|---|
| Famitsu | 4/10, 7/10, 6/10, 5/10 |
| Game Boy | 3/5, 4/5, 3/5, 3/5 |
| Hippon Super! | 4/10 |
| Super Gaming | 9/10, 7/10, 9/10 |

Crisis Force received mostly positive reception from critics. Public response was also positive; Japanese readers of Family Computer Magazine voted to give the title a 20.3 out of 30 score, indicating a popular following among the Famicom userbase. Famitsu's four reviewers regarded the game to be "amazing" but criticized the flickering when too many objects are present on-screen and controls. Retro Gamer's John Szczepaniak praised the game's use of parallax scrolling, lush visuals, soundtrack, weapons system and fast-pacing. Likewise, Neil Salvemini of SHMUPS! (a classic network of GameSpy) complemented the frantic gameplay, co-op play, graphics and fast-paced soundtrack.

The Aurawing makes an appearance as a playable ship in Konami's Airforce Delta series.
