= Yamaha YMZ280B =

Sound chip

The Yamaha YMZ280B, also known as PCMD8, is a sound chip produced by Yamaha Corporation. It is an eight-channel PCM/ADPCM sample-based synthesizer designed for use with video game machines, packaged in a 64-pin QFP.

== Features ==
- Up to 8 simultaneous sounds (voices)
- Waveform data lengths of 4 (ADPCM), 8, 16 bits (PCM)
- Stereo output (with a 4-bit/16-level pan for each voice)
- Up to 16 MB of external memory for wave data
- External ROM or SRAM memory.

The YMZ280B can either use an internal crystal oscillator running at 16.9344 MHz or be connected to a master clock line. The chip can be connected to up to 16 MB of external memory to provide the voice data for sound reproduction. The sound data can be encoded as 4-bit ADPCM, 8-bit PCM, or 16-bit PCM, played back in a wide range of frequencies (up to 256 steps), and then mixed together and output as a two's complement MSB-first digital data stream meant to be connected to a complementing DAC chip like the YAC513. The YMZ280B can also be connected to a YSS225 effects processor (EP), allowing two of the 8 channels to be processed further.

== Products ==
Per its design, the YMZ280B found significant use in arcade machines from the late 1990s. The first generation of video games from Cave were among the first to employ the chip. Later games from Data East and Kaneko also employed the chip.
