= Lagrange Point (video game) =

1991 video game

- Developer: Konami
- Publisher: Konami
- Designers: Daisuke Fujii; Yutaka Kaminaga
- Programmers: Kenichirō Horio; Takomonaka Higuchi; Toshiki Yamamura
- Artists: Kazuhiro Tateishi; Teisaku Seki
- Writers: Ryosuke Saejima; Ryōichi Satō; Yuuichiro Enoki
- Composers: Aki Hata (Uncredited); Akio Dobashi; Kenji Nakamura (Uncredited)
- Platform: Family Computer
- Release: JP: April 26, 1991
- Genre: Role-playing game
- Mode: Single-player

Lagrange Point (Note: Japanese: ラグランジュポイント, Hepburn: Raguranju Pointo) is a role-playing video game developed and published by Konami for the Family Computer. The game was released exclusively in Japan on April 26, 1991. The title of the game references Lagrangian points, the five positions in space where a body of negligible mass could be placed which would then maintain its position relative to two existing massive bodies.

Lagrange Point has the distinction of being one of only two games ever released with Konami's Virtual ROM Controller VII (VRC7) sound generator integrated circuit, which allowed for a drastic improvement in the quality of the music and sound effects used in the game. The game was never localized for Western audiences, however, an unofficial English translation was released in 2014 by Aeon Genesis.

== Plot ==
In the 22nd century, mankind has begun to emigrate into outer space. Three huge space colonies were constructed at a Lagrange point: the Isis Cluster; two artificial biospheres, named Land-1 and Land-2, and a satellite. In the year 0024 (55 years after the cluster was constructed), a biohazard outbreak occurred on Land 2. All attempts at contact were met with nothing but static. Now a research team led by their pilot, Gene, (Note: Japanese: ジン, Hepburn: Jin) approaches Land-1. Upon arrival, the team was attacked by a group of robots and the shuttle exploded due to the damage during the battle, knocking Gene out immediately after.

Gene then awakened in the medical centre of Isis City to find one of his team members fatally wounded. Said team member informs Gene that their goal was to find Stolte, (Note: Japanese: シュトルテ, Hepburn: Shutorute) a researcher at Land-2's Bio Research Lab, and Gene sets off to find him, wherever he is in Land-2.

== Reception ==
Reception

Review score
Publication	Score
PlayStation Magazine (JP)	24.1/30
