= Yamaha YS200 =

Synthesiser and workstation manufactured by Yamaha

YS200
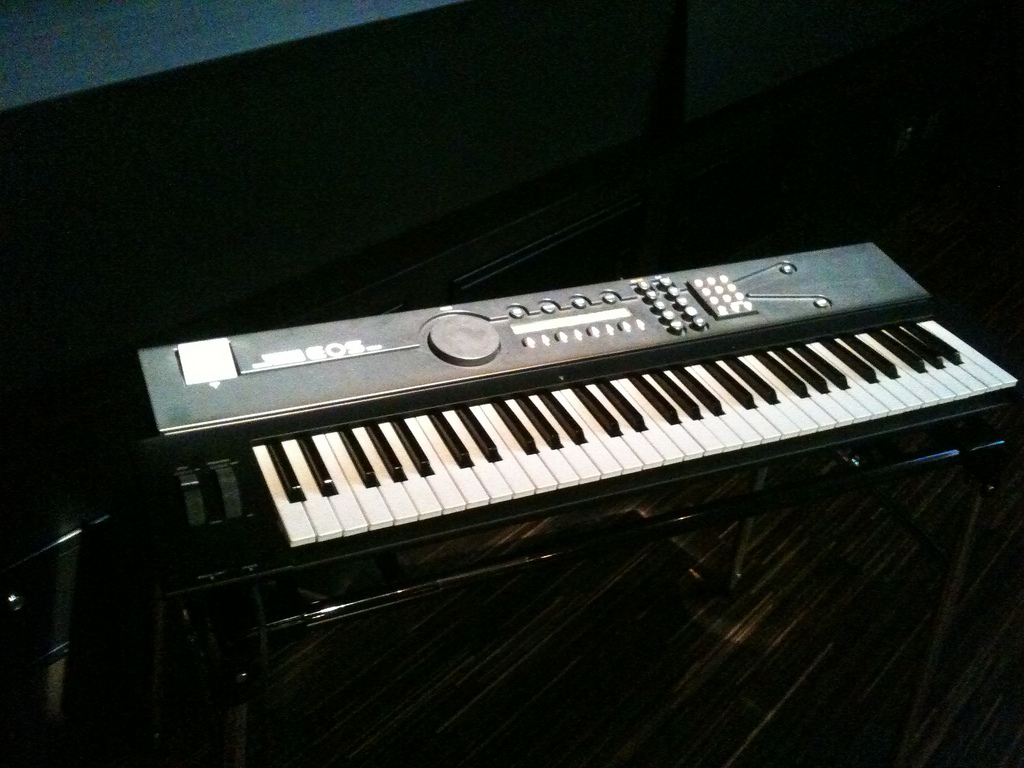
- Yamaha EOS YS200
- Manufacturer: Yamaha
- Dates: 1988

Technical specifications
- Polyphony: 8-voice
- Timbrality: 8-part
- Oscillator: 4-Operator
- Synthesis type: FM
- Filter: None
- Aftertouch expression: Yes, channel
- Velocity expression: Yes
- Storage memory: 100 preset, 100 user, 100 card
- Effects: Reverb, delay, distortion

Input/output
- Keyboard: 61 key
- External control: MIDI (In, Out, Thru)

The Yamaha YS200 is an FM synthesiser and workstation produced by Yamaha, introduced in 1988. It combines a sequencer, rhythm machine, an FM synthesis soundchip and a MIDI keyboard. It was called the EOS YS200 in Japan and was also released as a more home-oriented keyboard in the form of the Yamaha EOS B200, which also featured built-in stereo speakers. The YS200 is the keyboard equivalent of the Yamaha TQ5 module. The forerunner of the YS200 was the almost-identical Yamaha YS100.

== The sound module ==
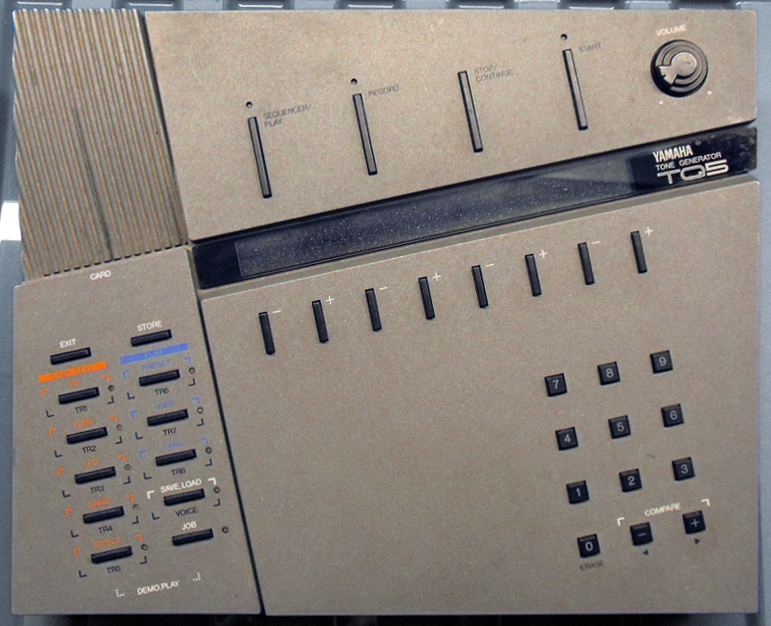
Yamaha TQ5

The frequency modulation synthesis provided by the YS/TQ sound engine is very similar to many other 4-op synths released by Yamaha during the 1980s. The YS/TQ is nearly fully compatible - aside from lacking portamento - with voices and sysex for the earlier DX11, DX21, DX27, DX100, and TX81Z. The synthesis unit has an 8-note polyphony and 8-instrument multitimbral capability.

The synthesis itself is based on 4 operators (each being an oscillator plus an envelope generator), which could be chained in various combinations by selecting one of the 8 available algorithms. Each operator can generate one of 8 selectable waveforms. Additionally, in each of the algorithms, operator 4 can be set to modulate itself with a configurable amount of feedback. The sound-producing unit is the same of the Yamaha TX81Z module, namely the Yamaha YM2414 soundchip.

The YS/TQ units contain 100 preset voices stored on ROM and an additional 100 user-configurable sounds in RAM. Voices can be assigned to up to 8 Instruments, which in turn can be layered into configurations called Performances, thus providing more interesting sounds than one voice could alone. One common way to use this feature is to include several instances of the same voice in the same performance while detuning each of them slightly to create a "thicker" or more lively sound.

The engine also provides a number of effects, including reverb, delay, and distortion.

== The keyboard ==
The YS200's keyboard consists of 61 keys, covering 5 octaves. It supports both velocity sensitivity and monophonic aftertouch. The MIDI transmit channel of the keyboard is configurable. Wheels for pitch bend and modulation control are provided on the left side of the keys.

== The sequencer ==
The internal sequencer has 8 tracks, with an approximate capability of 16000 notes shared between maximum of 8 songs at a time. Songs are stored in RAM and can also be saved to or loaded from an optional MCD memory card inserted into the built-in slot.

== Yamaha YS100 ==
The Yamaha YS100 was the previous YS synthesizer released by Yamaha, the only differences with the YS200 are that the YS100 lacks the built-in sequencer and aftertouch.
