= SYM DD50 =

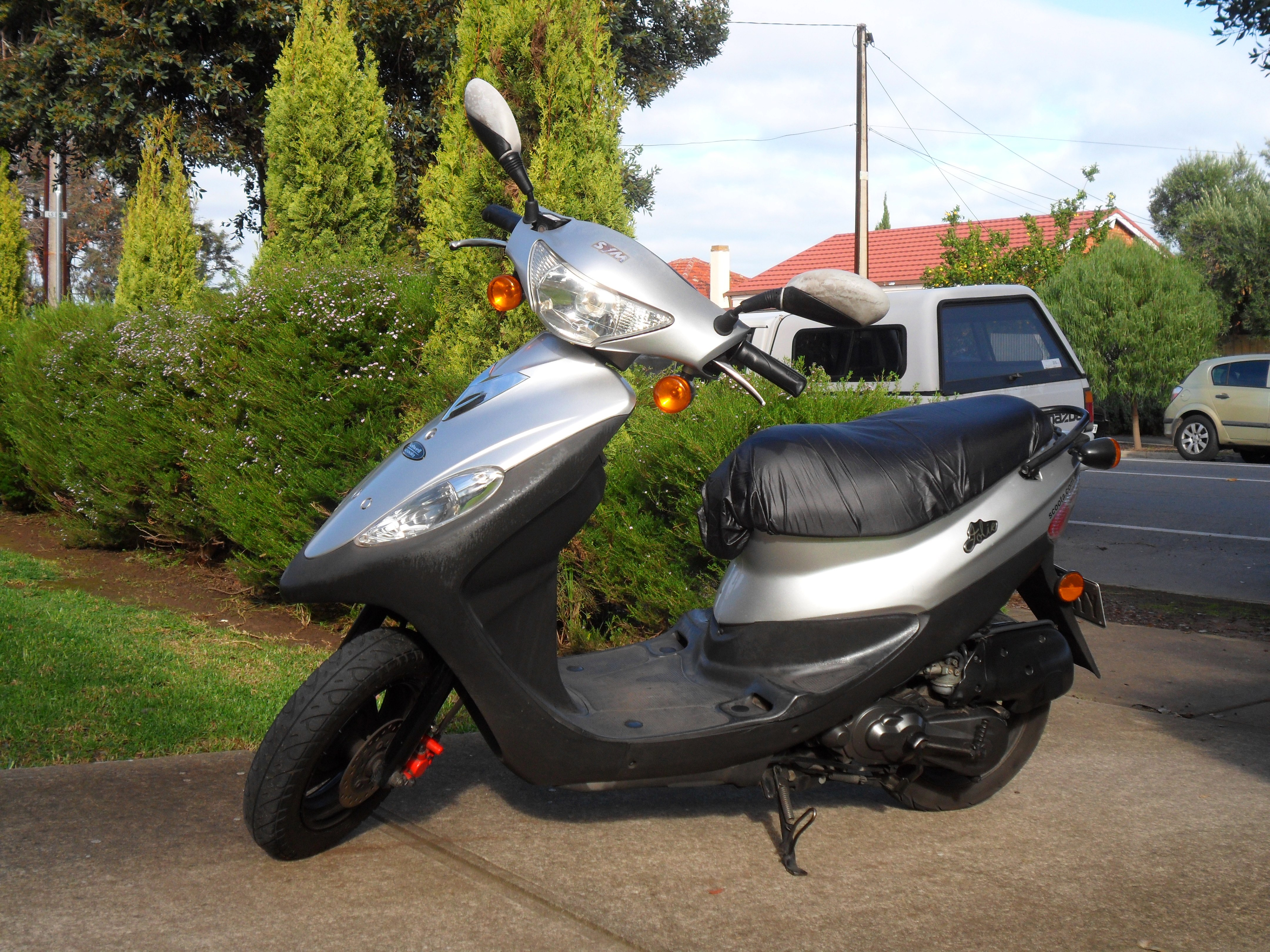
- Manufacturer: SYM Motors
- Also called: Jolie; City Trek
- Parent company: Sanyang Motor Co. Ltd
- Engine: 49 cc (3.0 cu in); 2-stroke auto-lub, air-cooled, single
- Bore / stroke: 39.0 mm × 41.4 mm (1.54 in × 1.63 in)
- Ignition type: Capacitor discharge electronic ignition (CDI); Self starter and kick starter
- Transmission: Continuously variable automatic transmission (CVT)
- Suspension: Telescopic fork (Front), single sided (rear)
- Brakes: Front; disc: rear drum
- Tires: 10-inch (front and rear)
- Wheelbase: 1.155 m (3 ft 9.5 in)
- Dimensions: L: 1.660 m (5 ft 5.4 in); W: 0.630 m (2 ft 0.8 in); H: 1.020 m (3 ft 4.2 in)
- Weight: 80 kg (180 lb) (dry)
- Fuel capacity: 6.1 L (1.3 imp gal; 1.6 US gal)
- Oil capacity: 1.0 L (0.22 imp gal; 0.26 US gal) 2 stroke oil

The SYM DD50 (also known as the SYM Jolie or City Trek, or in some markets as Super Pure,) is a single-cylinder, 49 cc (3.0 cu in), oil injected two-stroke, automatic scooter manufactured by the Taiwanese company SYM Motors.

== Overview ==
The DD50 has a continuously variable transmission, auto-choke, electric and kick starters, and auto-lubrication to simplify operation. In addition to a speedometer, the front console features a fuel level gauge and a low oil (two-stroke oil) indicator. The fuel tank has a capacity of 6.1 L (1.3 imp gal; 1.6 US gal). The DD50 has a dry weight of 80 kg (180 lb). The front brake is a hydraulic disc, and the rear brake is a drum. The under-seat luggage compartment is suitable for helmet storage.

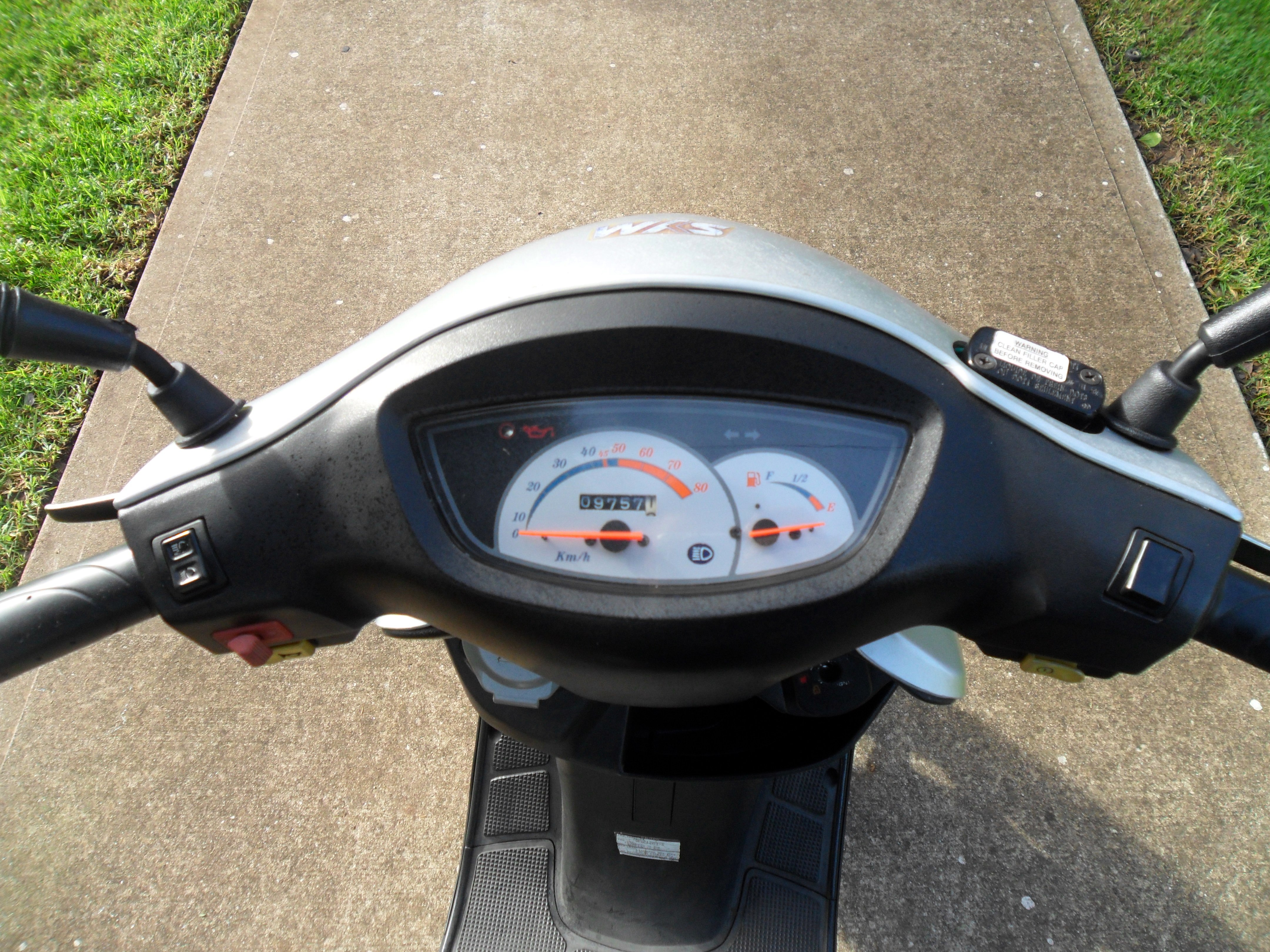
SYM Jolie Console
