= Sym Jet Euro X =

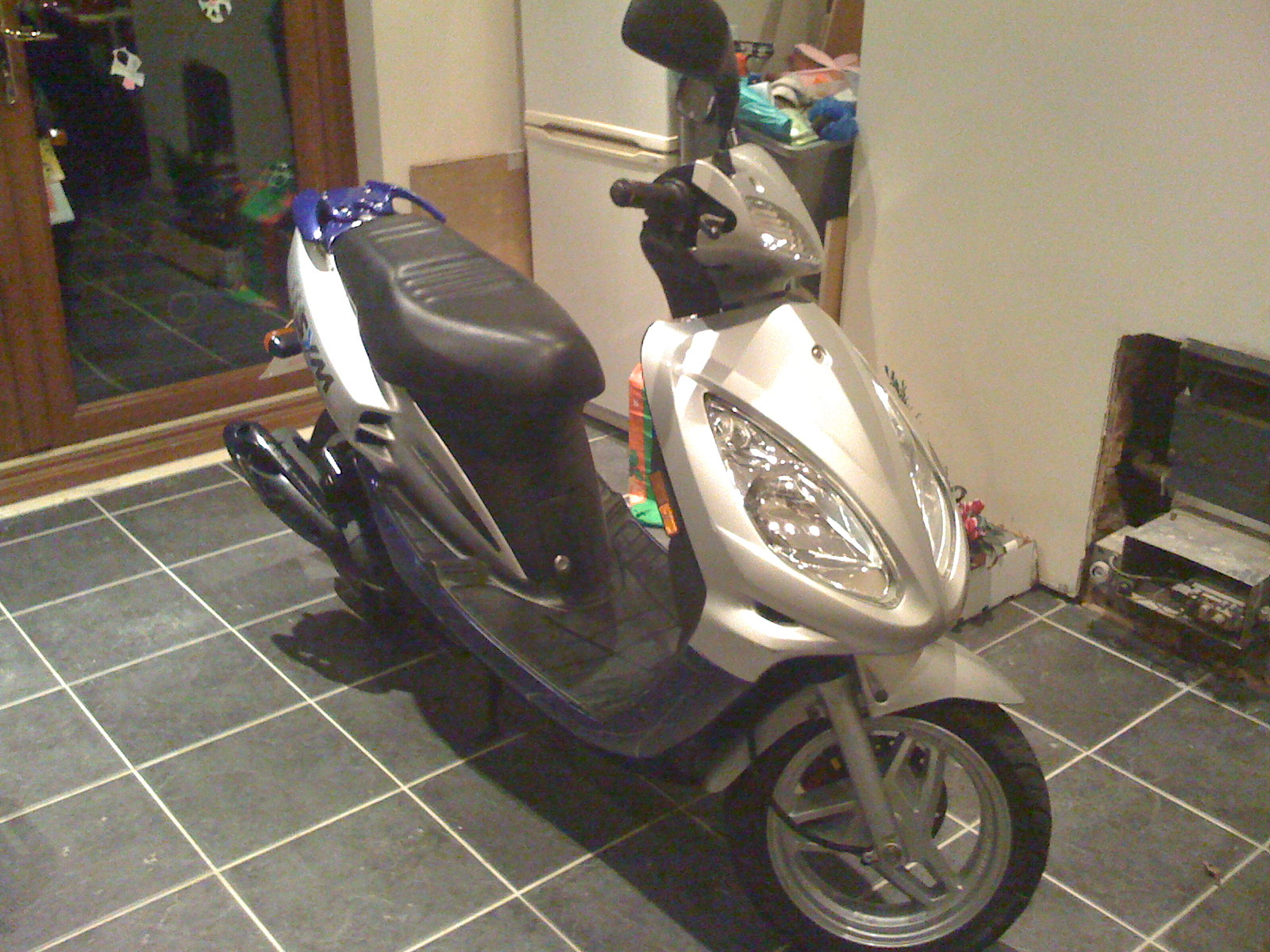
- Sym Jet Euro X
- Manufacturer: SYM Motors
- Parent company: Sanyang Motor Co. Ltd
- Production: 2003-2012
- Predecessor: SYM Jet
- Class: Moped; Scooter
- Engine: 50 cc (3.1 cu in) or 101 cc (6.2 cu in) 2-stroke, air-cooled, single
- Brakes: Front: disc Rear: drum
- Fuel capacity: 6.3 L (1.4 imp gal; 1.7 US gal)

The Sym Jet Euro X is both a scooter-style moped and scooter available with 49 cc (3.0 cu in) and 101 cc (6.2 cu in) two-stroke engines respectively. The 49cc version is limited to 31 mph (50 km/h), but once de-restricted, it can reach 40–45 mph. The underseat storage compartment can take a full-size helmet. Both engines are air-cooled. Both models have a front disc brake and rear drum brake and a fuel capacity of 6.3 L (1.4 imp gal; 1.7 US gal).
