= Sanyang Motor =

Taiwanese motorcycle manufacturing company

Sanyang Motor Co., Ltd.
- Sanyang Motor Logo
- Industry: Motorcycles and automobiles manufacturing and sales
- Founded: 1954; 72 years ago
- Headquarters: Hukou, Hsinchu County, Taiwan
- Key people: Walter H.C. Chang
- Subsidiaries: Nova Design; Xiashing Motorcycle; VMEP
- Website: http://www.sym-global.com

Sanyang Motor
- Chinese: 三陽工業股份有限公司
Transcriptions
Standard Mandarin
- Hanyu Pinyin: Sānyáng Gōngyè Gǔfèn Yǒuxiàn Gōngsī
Hakka
- Romanization: Sâm-yòng Kûng-ngia̍p Kú-fun Yû-han Kûng-sṳ̂
Southern Min
- Hokkien POJ: Sam-iông Kang-gia̍p Kó͘-hūn Iú-hān Kong-si

Sanyang Motor Co., Ltd. (Chinese: 三陽工業股份有限公司; pinyin: Sānyáng Gōngyè Gǔfèn Yǒuxiàn Gōngsī) (stylized as SYM) is a Taiwanese motorcycle manufacturer headquartered in Hukou, Taiwan. Founded in Taipei, Taiwan, in 1954 by Huang Chi-Chun and Chang Kuo An, SYM currently has three major production facilities in Taiwan, mainland China, and Vietnam. SYM manufactures and sells scooters, motorcycles and ATVs under the Sanyang Motor [SYM] brand, while it also manufactures automobiles and mini-trucks under the Hyundai brand.

== History ==
In 1954 Sanyang Electrics was formed to manufacture dynamoelectric light sets for bicycles. It was restructured into Sanyang Industry Co. Ltd. and entered a technical agreement with Honda in 1961 to begin local assembly of motorcycles, the first motorcycle manufacturer in Taiwan (30% local content). In 1969 assembly of small Honda cars (N600, TN360) began. As Sanyang's own motorcycles entered direct competition with Honda's products worldwide, the relationship was terminated in January 2002 and Honda began building cars themselves as Honda Taiwan Co. Ltd. Sanyang instead signed a contract with Hyundai and currently assembles much of their lineup for the domestic Taiwanese market.

Sanyang Industry was renamed as Sanyang Motor Co. Ltd. in January 2015. The company has its main office in the Hsinchu Industrial Park in Hsinchu County, Taiwan. It has a subsidiary in Xiamen city, China, named Xiamen Xiashing Motorcycle Co., Ltd., and another subsidiary in Bien Hoa, Dong Nai, Vietnam, named Vietnam Manufacturing & Export Processing Co., Ltd. (VMEP).

== Global operations ==
Sanyang is a strategic partner of the Hyundai Motor Company since 2002. Its subsidiary company Nan Yang Industries Co., Ltd. operates as sole distributor for Hyundai and manufactures Hyundai automobiles and mini-trucks in Taiwan. Sanyang also has ties with international companies like International Truck, Bombardier Recreational Products and Mahindra & Mahindra Limited in India.

In July 2005, Sanyang launched a new range of two-wheelers for sale in the European market. The range includes the GTS scooter (available with 125 cc, 200 cc and 250 cc engines), the MIO scooter (50 cc and 100 cc), and two ATV models: the Trackrunner leisure ATV (200 cc engine), and the 250 cc Quadlander off-roader.

In January 2006, Sanyang signed an agreement with the Kinetic Motor Company of India for a purchase of 2,065,000 equity shares and technical collaboration, which will amount to Sanyang holding an 11.1% (approx.) stake of the enhanced capital of Kinetic Motor Company Limited. With Sanyang taking a minority stake, the management control will be retained with the Kinetic Group. In 2008, the two-wheeler division of The Kinetic Group was taken over by Mahindra, a leading manufacturer of utility vehicles in India.

In 2002, SYM scooters began appearing in the US courtesy of a grey market importer SYM USA from West Palm Beach, Florida. Several hundred units were imported from the UK that were non-EPA, non-DOT certified and a rogue US distribution network developed.

In 2003 an official importer, SYM America, organized by the Malaguti USA importer, began operations selling in the Southeast and Puerto Rico. In 2004 Tomos USA negotiated with Sanyang for exclusive sales in the US, but the deal was called off later due to some disagreement on contact details. Sanyang later cooperated with Carter Brothers Mfg. Co. Inc for its sales in the US. Malaguti USA ceased and became Martin Racing Performance and still carried some parts for the DD 50 and Jet Euro 50. In an agreement reached with Carter Brothers Mfg. Co. Inc. the company abandoned the SYM scooter distribution project for the US in exchange for assistance in developing the after-market go kart product and stocking the SYM upgrade lines for Carter Brothers Mfg. Co. Inc.

In January 2006, SYM signed a partnership agreement with Carter Brothers Mfg. Co. Inc. for exclusive distribution rights in the United States of America. Operating out of a 235,000 sq ft (21,800 m^{2}) office-production-and-warehouse facility in the small town of Brundidge, Alabama, 60 miles (97 km) south of Montgomery, Carter Brothers claims to be the oldest and largest continually operating manufacturer of go-karts and off-road buggies in the world. Established in 1936 by the brothers W.W. Carter and Charlie Carter, the company initially specialized in manufacturing agricultural machinery, lawnmowers and personal gardening equipment.

On 12 July 2010, a fire destroyed Carter Brother's main warehouse and manufacturing facility, resulting in the loss of approximately 3,000 unsold SYM scooters. A subsequent investigation by the Alabama State Fire Marshal's Office determined that the cause of the fire was arson.

In March 2011, an official at Carter Brothers Mfg. Co. Inc. made it known to the editor of the Team Symba web blog that the partnership agreement between SYM and Carter Brothers would end as of 1 April 2011. Also in March 2011, Alliance Powersports, Inc. (a subsidiary of Lance Powersports, Inc.) of Mira Loma, California, notified existing SYM dealers that it had signed an exclusive distribution agreement with SYM for the western half of the US.

In July 2014, Walter H. C. Chang was appointed Chairman of Sanyang Motor. He has been taking actions to further strengthen the company's core businesses, optimize sales channels and increase customers' satisfaction.

== Models ==
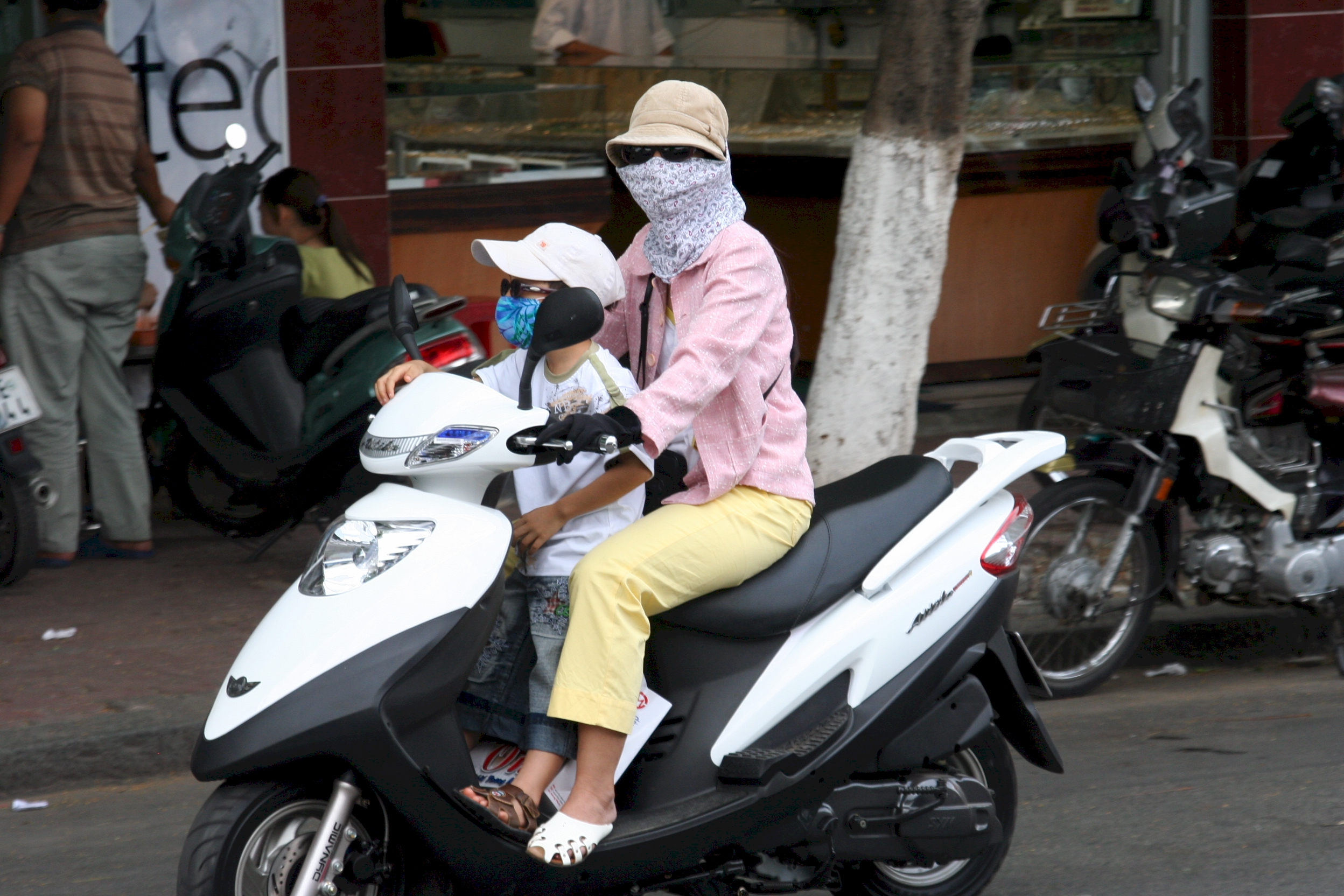
SYM Attila in Ho Chi Minh City

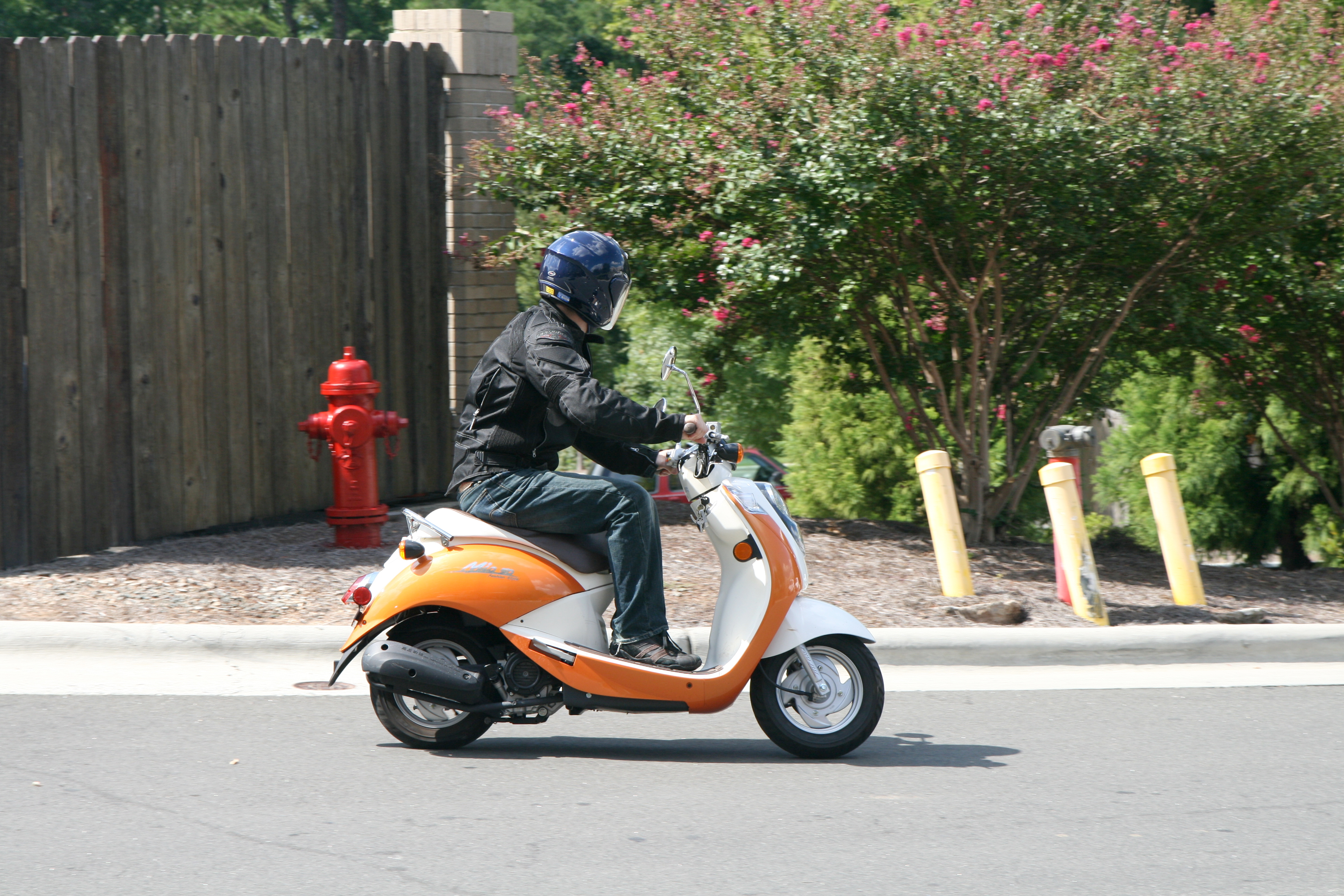
SYM Mio in Durham, North Carolina

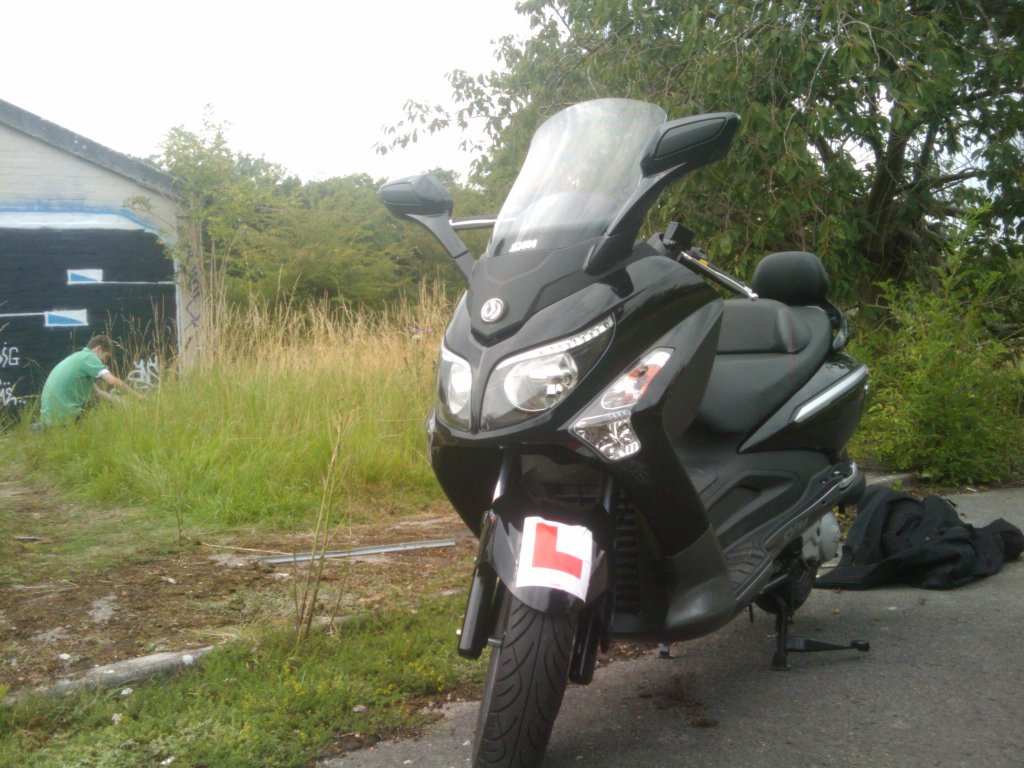
SYM GTS EVO 125i at HMS Royal Arthur in Corsham, Wiltshire

=== Scooters ===
The company has offered, or now offers, the following scooter models:

- Allo 50, 125 (also called SYM Cello)
- Attila
- CLBCU
- Crox
- Cinderella/Party 50, 100
- Citycom 125, 300
- Cruisym 125, 300
- Cruisym Alpha 125, 300
- DD 50 (also called SYM Jolie)
- DRGBT
- Duke
- Euro MX
- Fancy 50
- Fiddle

2009 SYM Fiddle II

- Flash 50
- Flyte
- Fugue (also called Tuscany)
- Free 50
- GR125
- Joymax 125, 250, 300 (also called SYM Voyager, SYM GTS and GTS EVO)
- HD
- Jet
- Jet 4
- Jet 14
- Jet 14 Evo
- Jet Euro X
- JetPower
- Jet S
- Jet Sport X
- Jet X (2021-present, also called GPX Drone)
- Joyride (also called Le Grande in Australia)
- Jungle
- Lance Cabo 50/100/150 cc
- Lance Cali Classic 50/125/150/169 cc (the 169 cc is fuel injected, and marketed as a 200i)
- Lance Havana Classic 50/125/150/169 cc (the 169 cc is fuel injected, and marketed as a 200i)
- Lance PCH 50/125/150 cc
- Lance Soho 50
- Mask
- Maxsym 400i, 600i
- Maxsym TL500, TL508
- Megalo
- Mio 50, 100, 115
- Orbit/Classic
- Orbit 150
- PCH 50/125/150/169 cc (the 169 cc is fuel injected, and marketed as a 200i)
- Pure
- Pure SR ("Super Race" Version of Pure/Flash 50)
- Symply
- Radar-X (Also called Radar 125 in Thailand)
- Red Devil (also a Michael Schumacher Version available)
- RS
- RV250
- Super Duke
- Super Fancy 50
- Shark
- VS/Excel II
- Fighter (carbureted, ZR dual disc version and EFI VIP)
- New Fighter (EFI with STCS intake technology)
- Xpro series
- Symphony
- Symphony 125S
- Symphony SR
- Symphony ST (Also called Fancy 125 in Vietnam)
- Symmetry
- Z1
- TTLBT 508

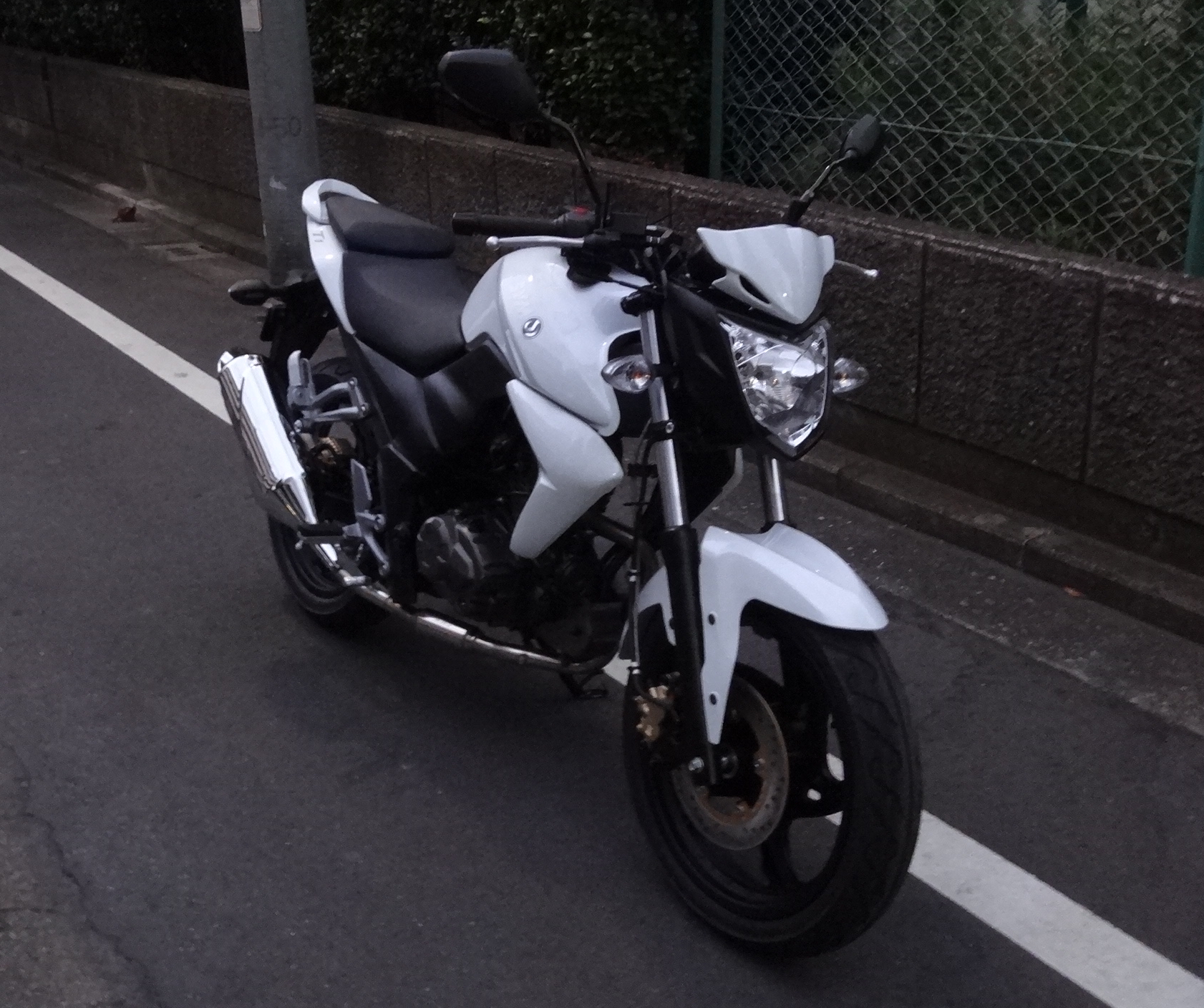
SYM T1

=== Motorcycles ===
SYM 250

- Bonus MB125A
- Wolf 125/150/300
- Wolf Classic 125/150
- T1 150
- T2 250
- T3 280
- RV 1–2
- XS125-K
- Wolf SB 250NI
- Husky 125

SYM 278

- NH-T 280/300 (called also as Dafra NH-300 in Brazil)

SYM 185+

- VF 185
- NH-T 190/200 (Trazer)
- NH-X 190/200

SYM 125

- VF 125
- NH-T 125
- NH-X 125

=== Cubs ===
- VF3i 185 / Star SR 170
- Sport Rider / StarX 125i
- Bonus 100
- Bonus 110
- Magic 110RR
- RV1
- Symba

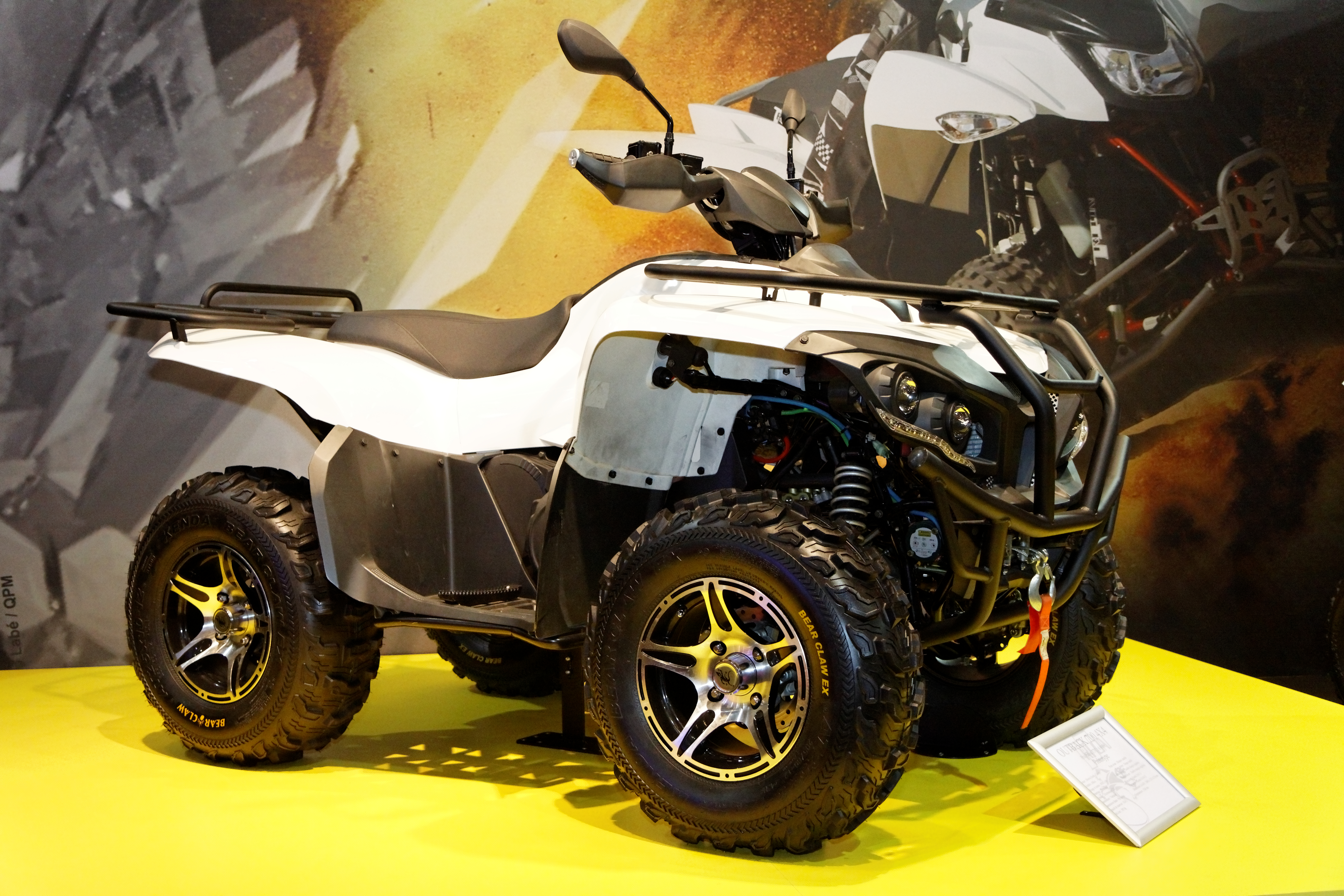
SYM Outback 700

=== ATVs ===
- Outback 700
- Track Runner
- QuadLander
- Quadraider 600cc

=== Light Trucks and Vans ===
- T880/T1000/V5/V9/V11
- 2.0T

== See also ==
- Kymco
- List of companies of Taiwan
- List of Taiwanese automakers
- Automotive industry in Taiwan
