= Yamaha V50 (music workstation) =

Music workstation of Yamaha

V50
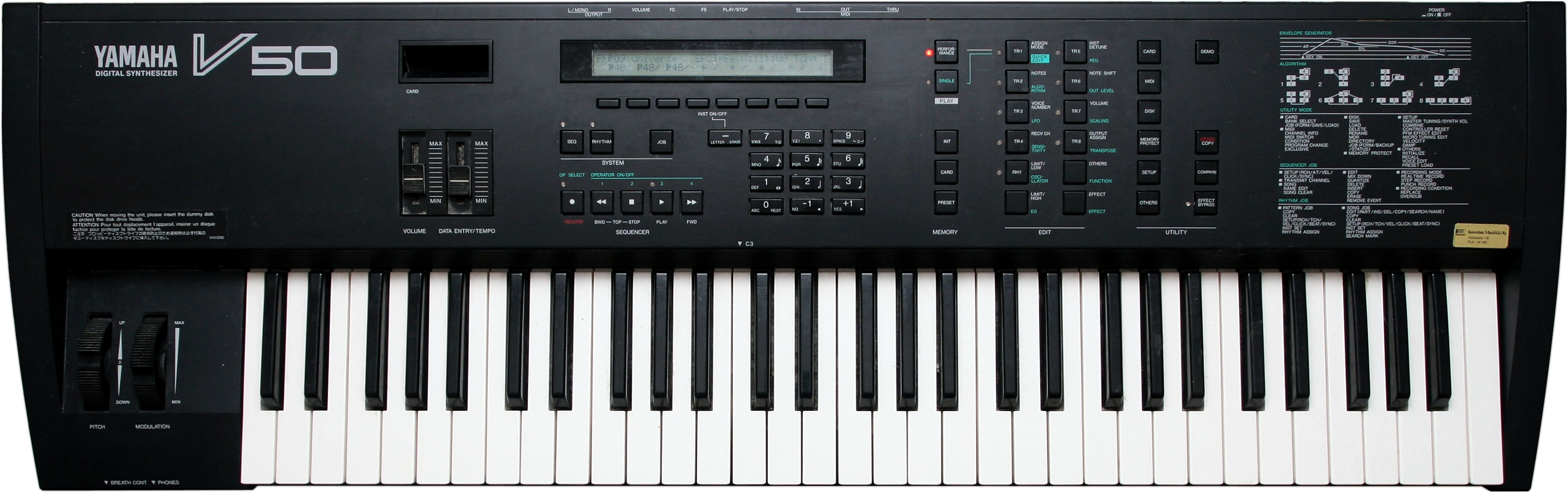
- Yamaha V50 synthesizer
- Manufacturer: Yamaha Corporation
- Dates: 1989
- Price: US $1,895

Technical specifications
- Polyphony: 16-note
- Timbrality: 8-instrument multitimbral capability
- Oscillator: 4 oscillators per voice, 8 algorithms
- Synthesis type: Digital controlled Frequency Modulation with PCM rhythm machine
- Aftertouch expression: Yes
- Velocity expression: Yes
- Storage memory: 100 preset voices plus 100 user voices

Input/output
- Keyboard: 61 keys
- Left-hand control: Pitch bend and modulation wheels
- External control: MIDI in/out/thru foot volume/control/switch

The Yamaha V50 is a hybrid music workstation introduced in 1989. It combines a sequencer, rhythm machine, an FM synthesis-based sound module and a MIDI keyboard.

== Features ==
=== The sequencer ===
The internal sequencer has 8 tracks, with an approximate capability of 16,000 notes shared between maximum of 8 songs at a time.

=== Rhythm machine ===
The rhythm machine has 61 PCM samples, with polyphony of 8 notes. The rhythm machine contains 100 preset short rhythm patterns and allows the user to create 100 additional patterns, known as "internal patterns". The patterns can be assembled into larger rhythm songs and adjusted "on the fly" (e.g. stop/start, tempo, volume, pattern select) while playing a synth sound patch or performance. Users can also let the rhythm play while simultaneously changing the voice/performance patch, allowing for uninterrupted experimentation and live performance.

== The sound module ==
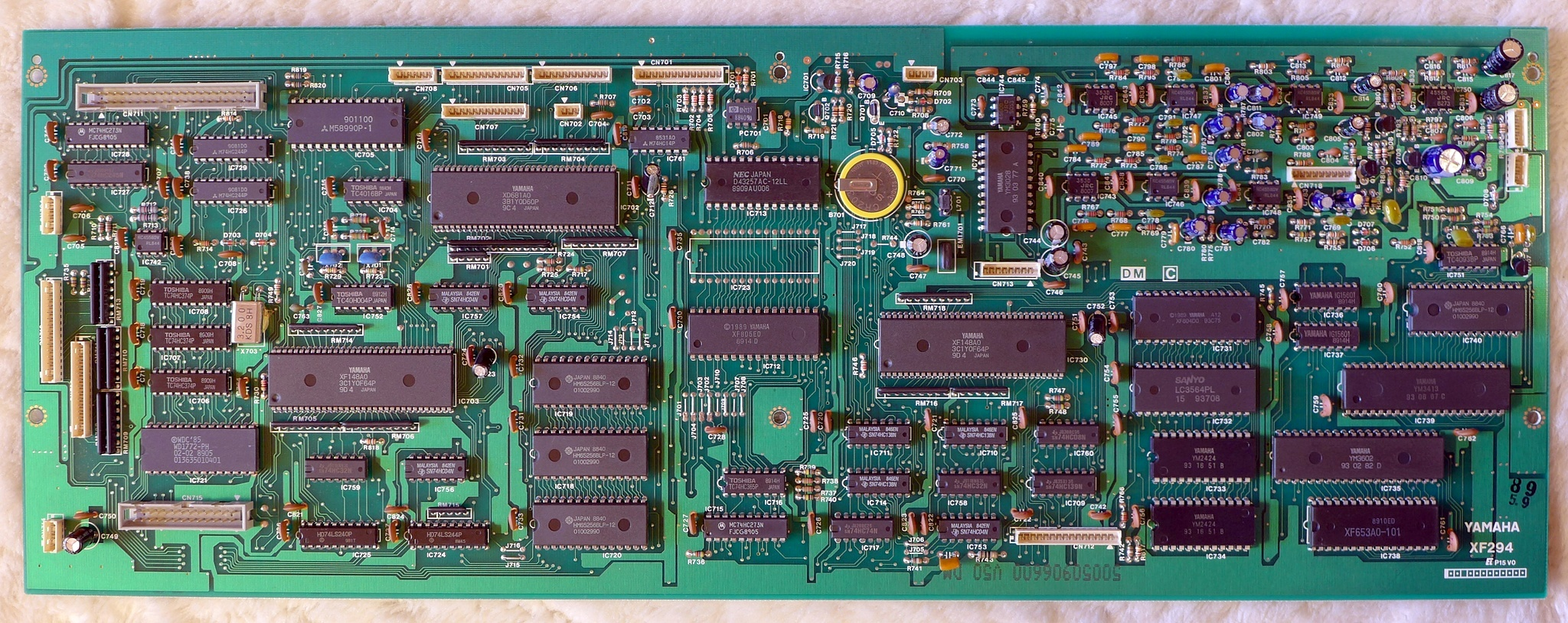
The main board of the V50

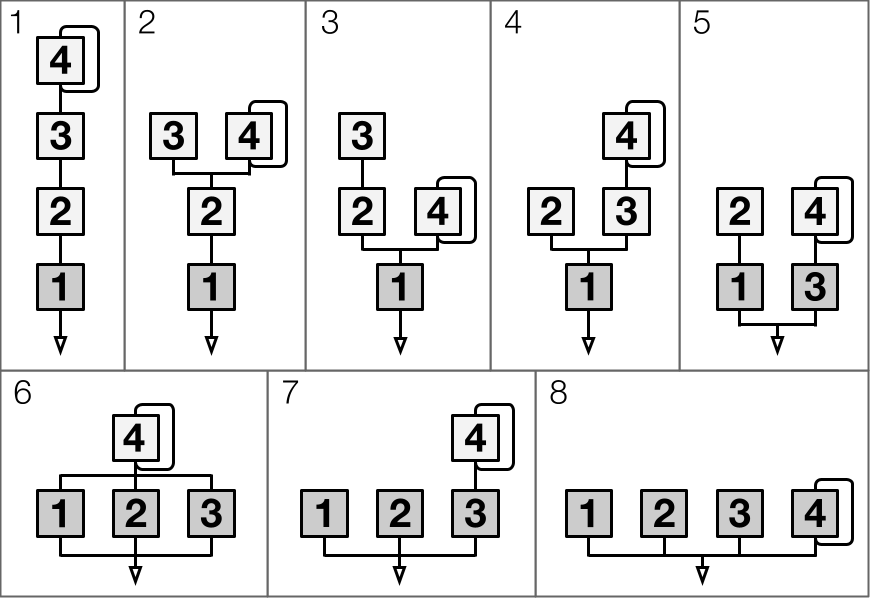
The algorithms available to the V50, along with other 4-operator FM synths

The FM synthesis provided by the sound module is based on 4 operators that can be chained by selecting one of the 8 available routings, called algorithms. Each operator can generate one of 8 available waveforms. Additionally, in each of the algorithms, operator 4 can be set to modulate itself with feedback. The synth is essentially two Yamaha TX81Z modules, with a few minor tweaks including a fixed-frequency mode that can go much lower. The V50 uses two YM2424/OPZII chips, which is an upgraded version of the YM2414 used in the TX81Z, among other synthesizers.

The synth has a 16-note polyphony and 8-instrument multitimbral capability. There are 100 presets stored on ROM and an additional 100 user-programmable sounds. Multiple sounds can be layered into what Yamaha terms "Performances" to produce richer or more interesting sounds than one instrument could provide alone. One common way to use this feature is to include several instances of the same instrument while detuning each of them slightly to create a "thicker" or more lively sound. You can layer or split (i.e. zone) the keyboard with up to 8 different (or same) "Single" voice patches to create a "Performance" patch which can result in very complex and unique tones.

There are 11 tunings available including the standard Equal Temperament, useful to experiment or produce a performance of classical music in the tuning of its day (e.g. Pythagorean, Werckmeister, 1/4 tone, etc). Microtuning is also available allowing the user to specify the pitch of each note to create unique tunings.

Basic editing of FM tones is made easier on the V50 using a "Quick Edit" function, which allows users to easily edit the attack, release, and total volume level of an operator.

== The keyboard ==
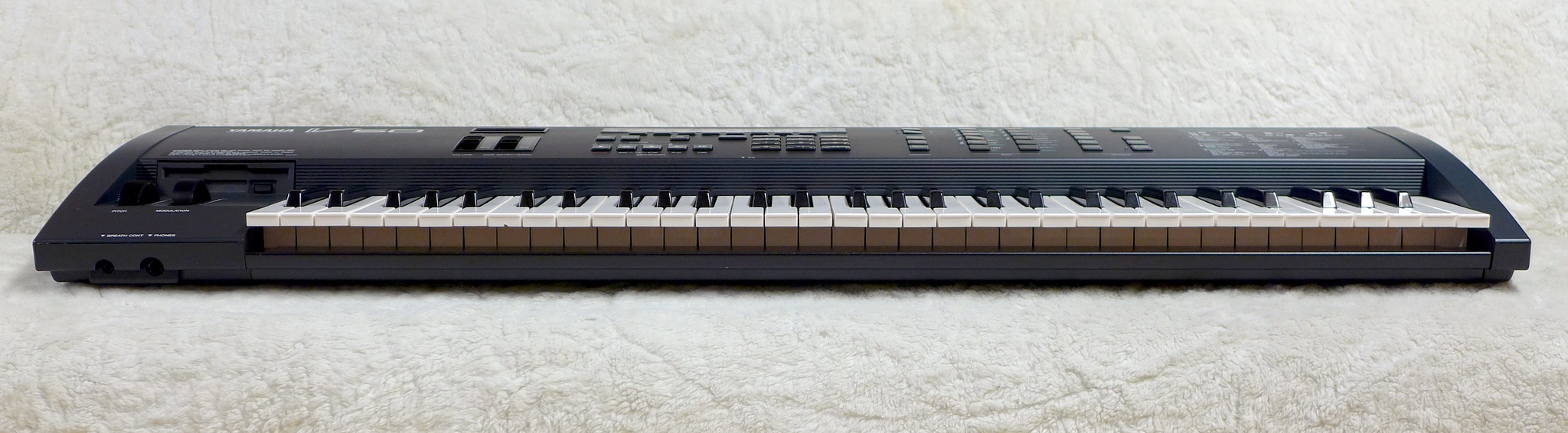
Front

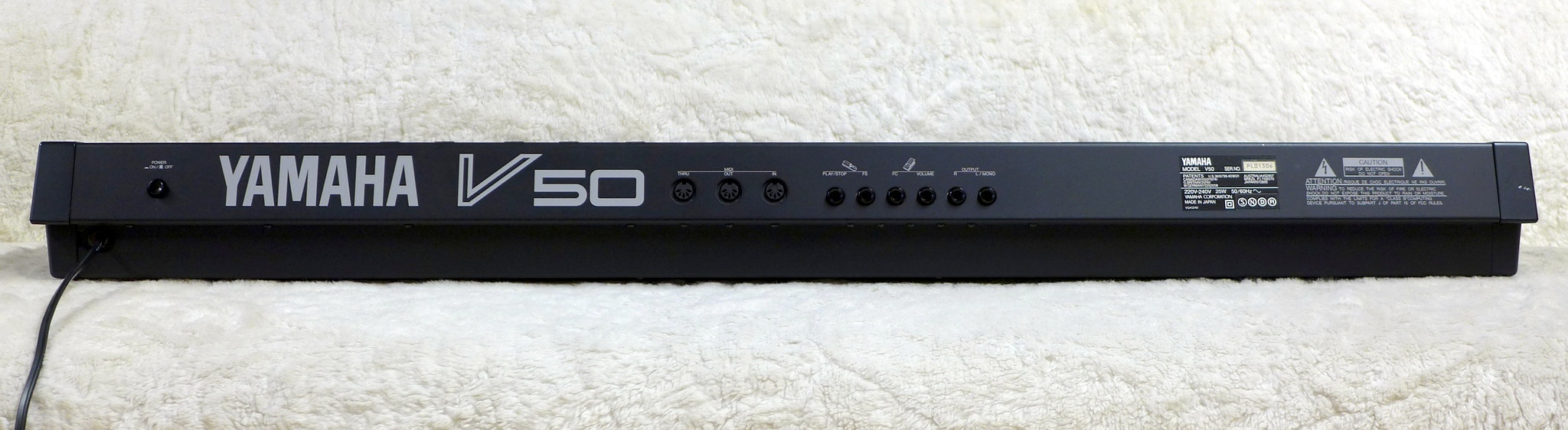
Back

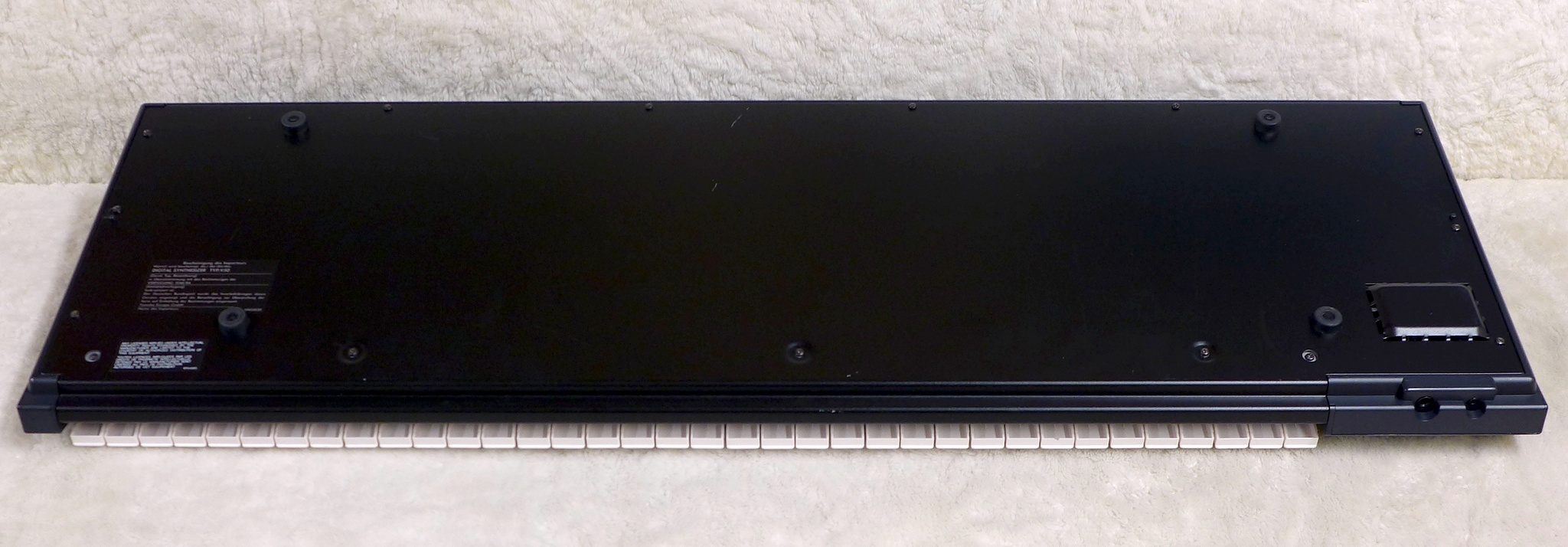
Bottom

The V50 keyboard consists of 61 keys, covering 5 octaves. It supports both velocity sensitivity and channel aftertouch. The MIDI transmit channel of the keyboard is configurable. Wheels for pitch bend and modulation control are provided on the left side of the keys.

== Other features ==
The V50 has both a double density 3.5" floppy drive and a memory card slot (MCD64 or MCD32) for storing and retrieving user- or third-party-created content.

The unit also has a built-in effects unit with 31 different effects such as various types of reverb and delay. Most of the effects have configurable parameters. The unit is capable of only one effect at a time, shared both by the rhythm machine and the FM synthesis unit. The ratio of the processed and unprocessed sound in the output can be configured. The processing can also be toggled off for individual channels.

== Gallery ==
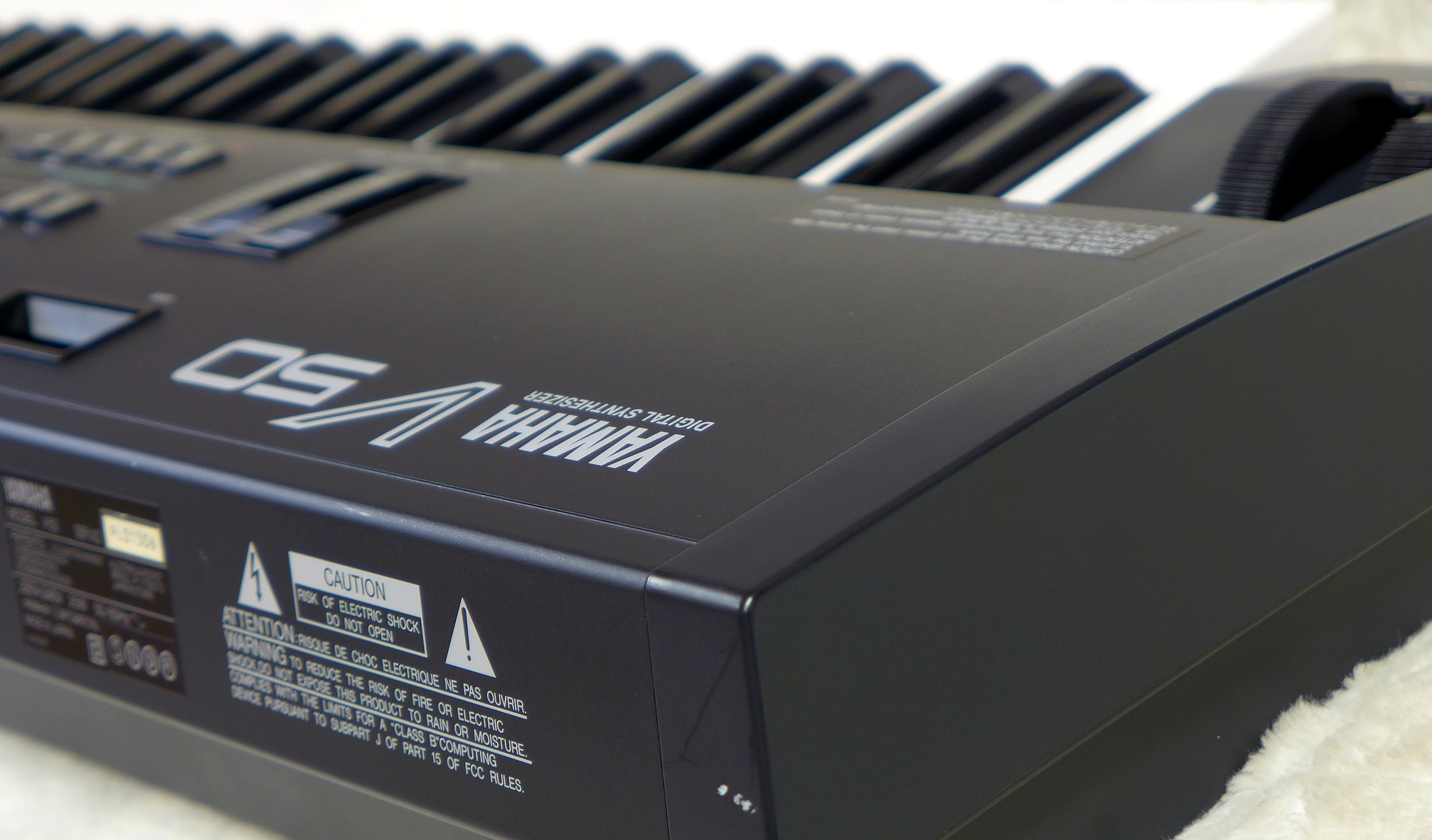

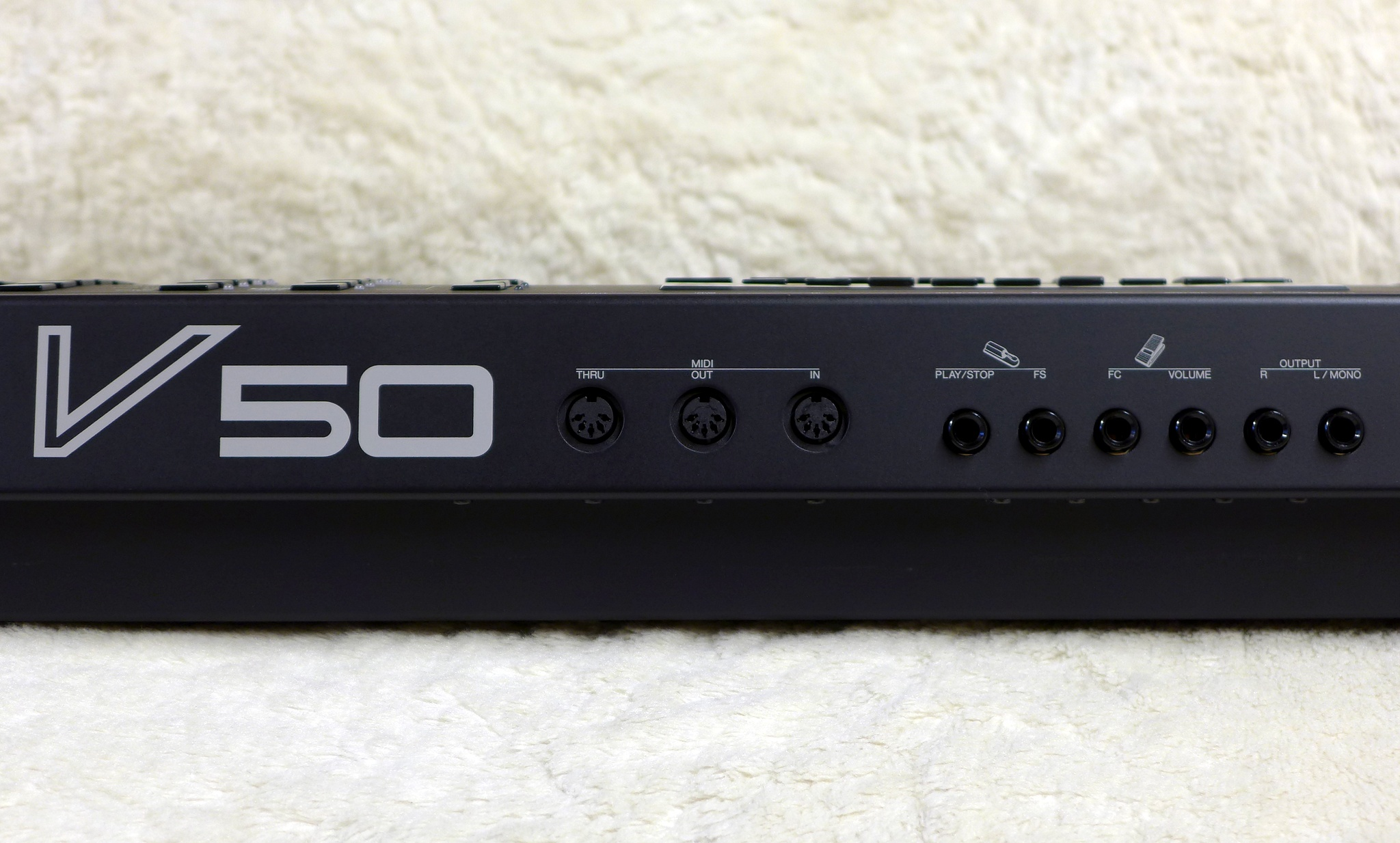
Close-up of backside connectors

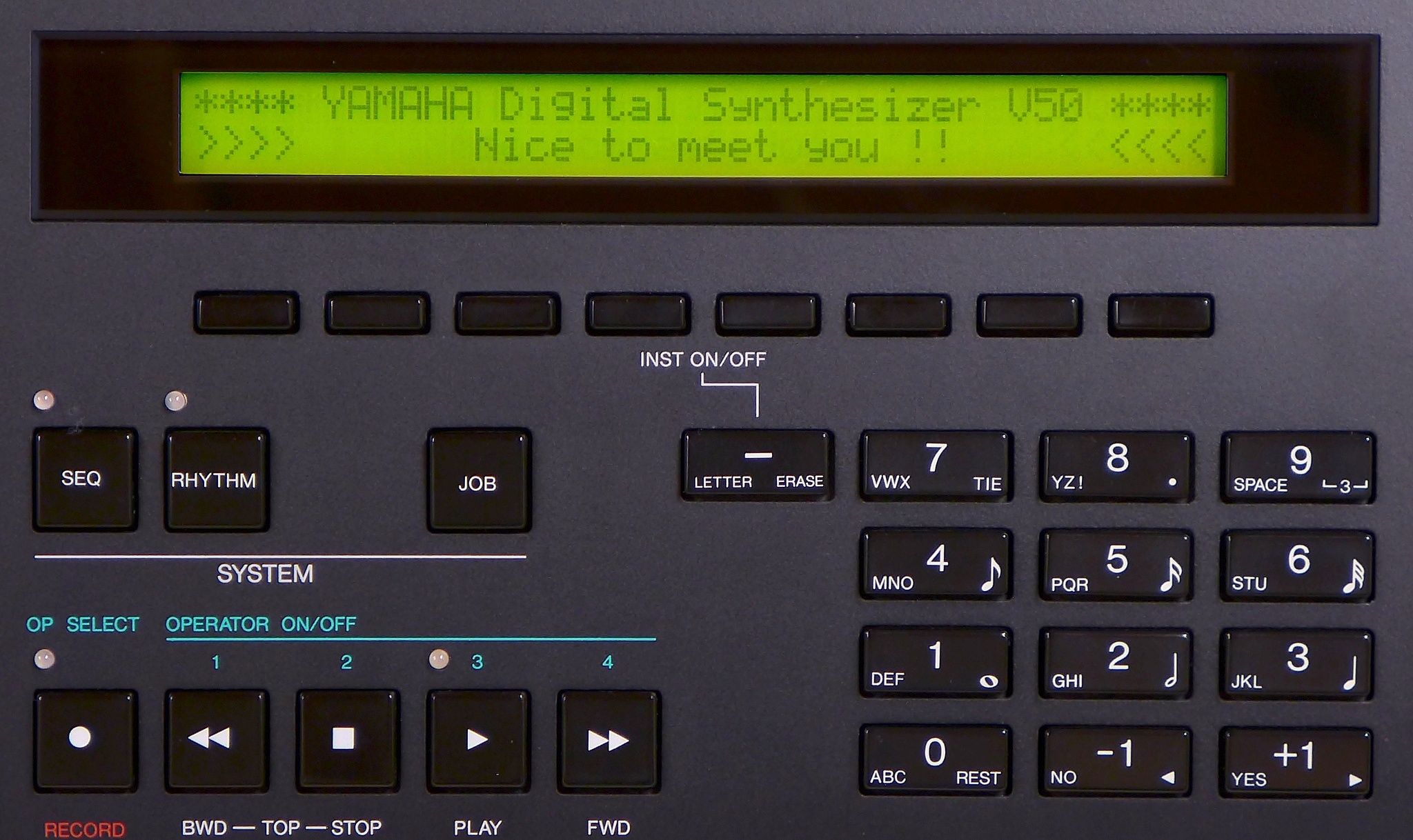
The backlit display

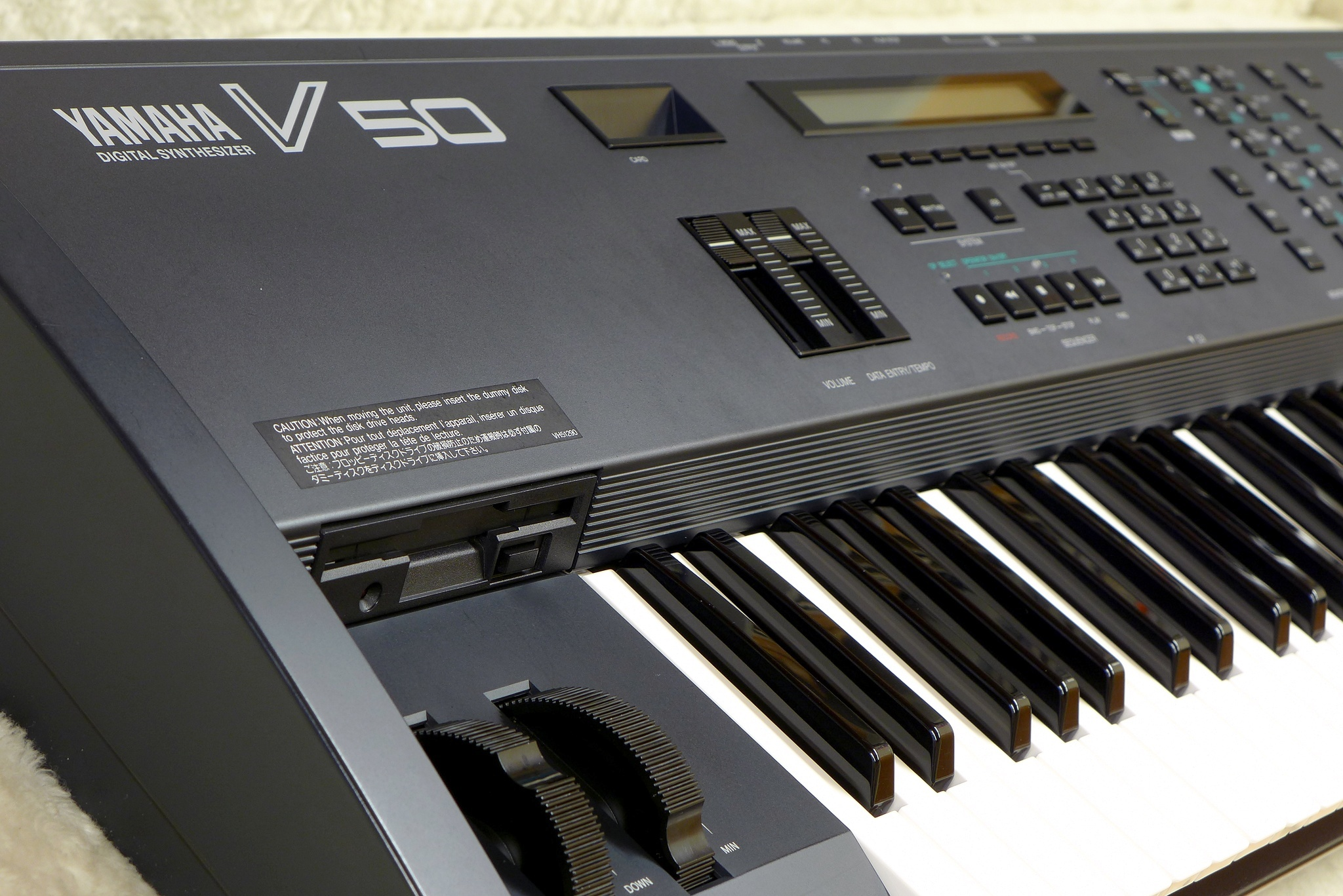

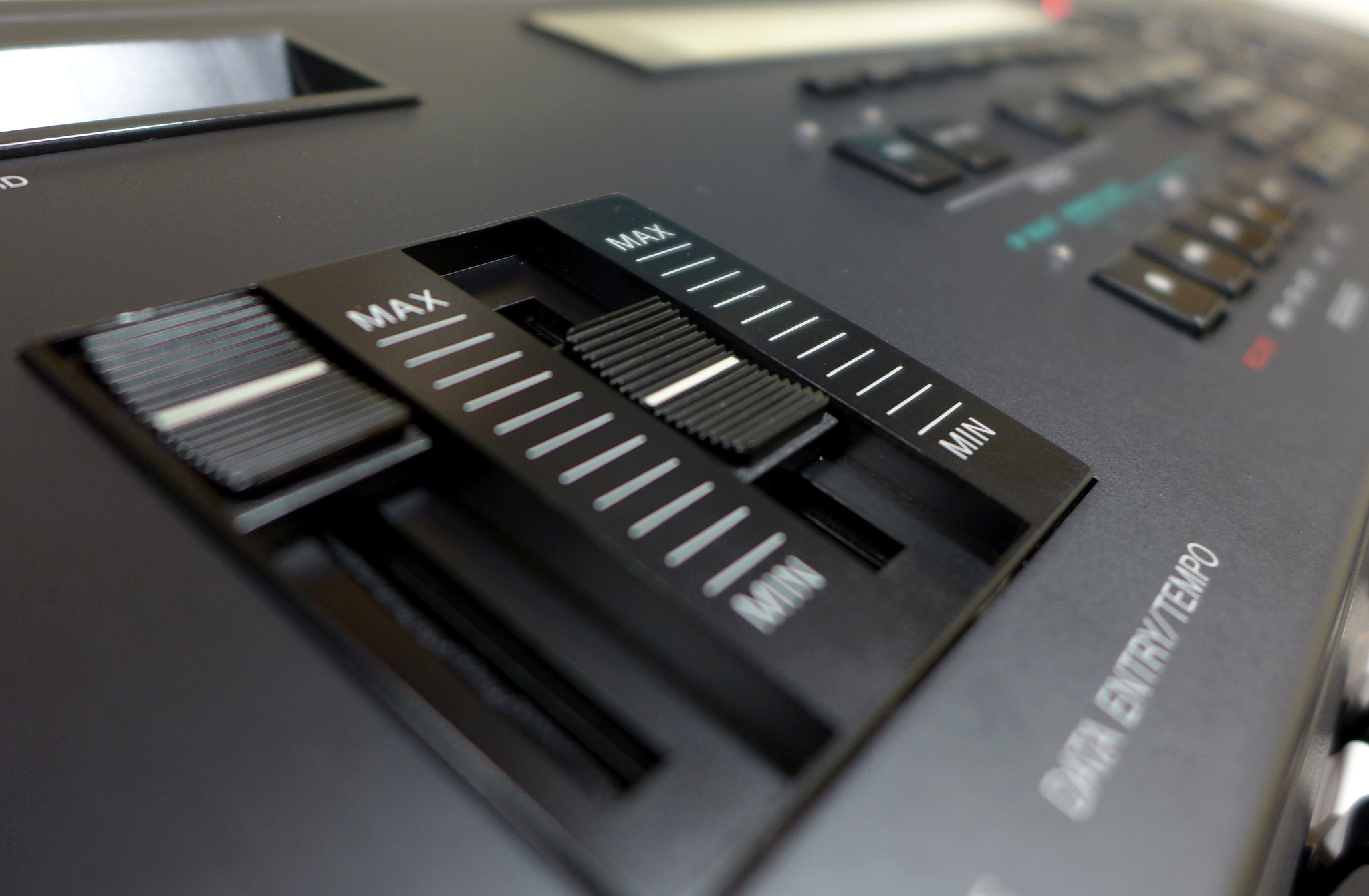
Panel sliders

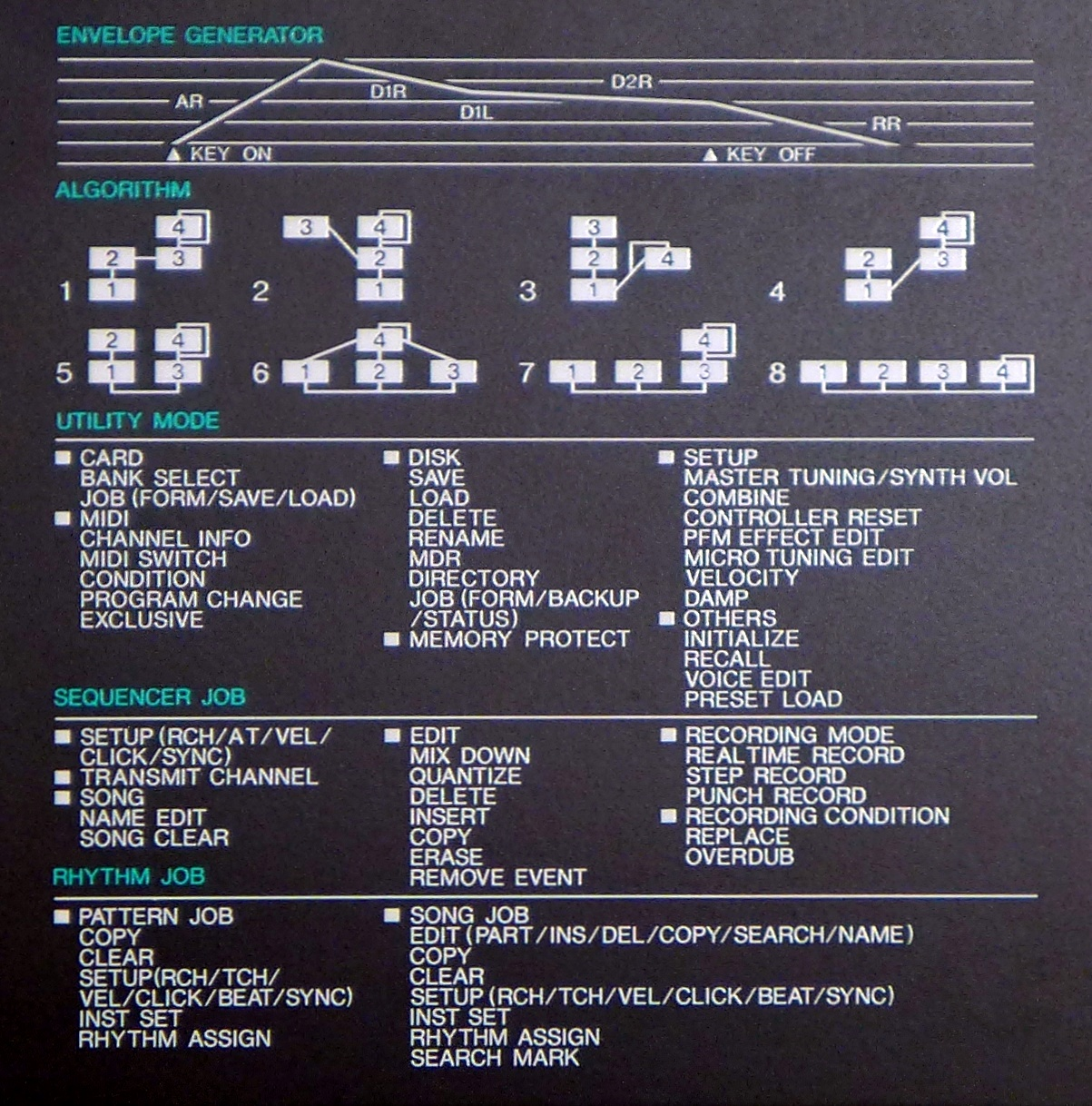
Chart showing users how to edit the FM sounds

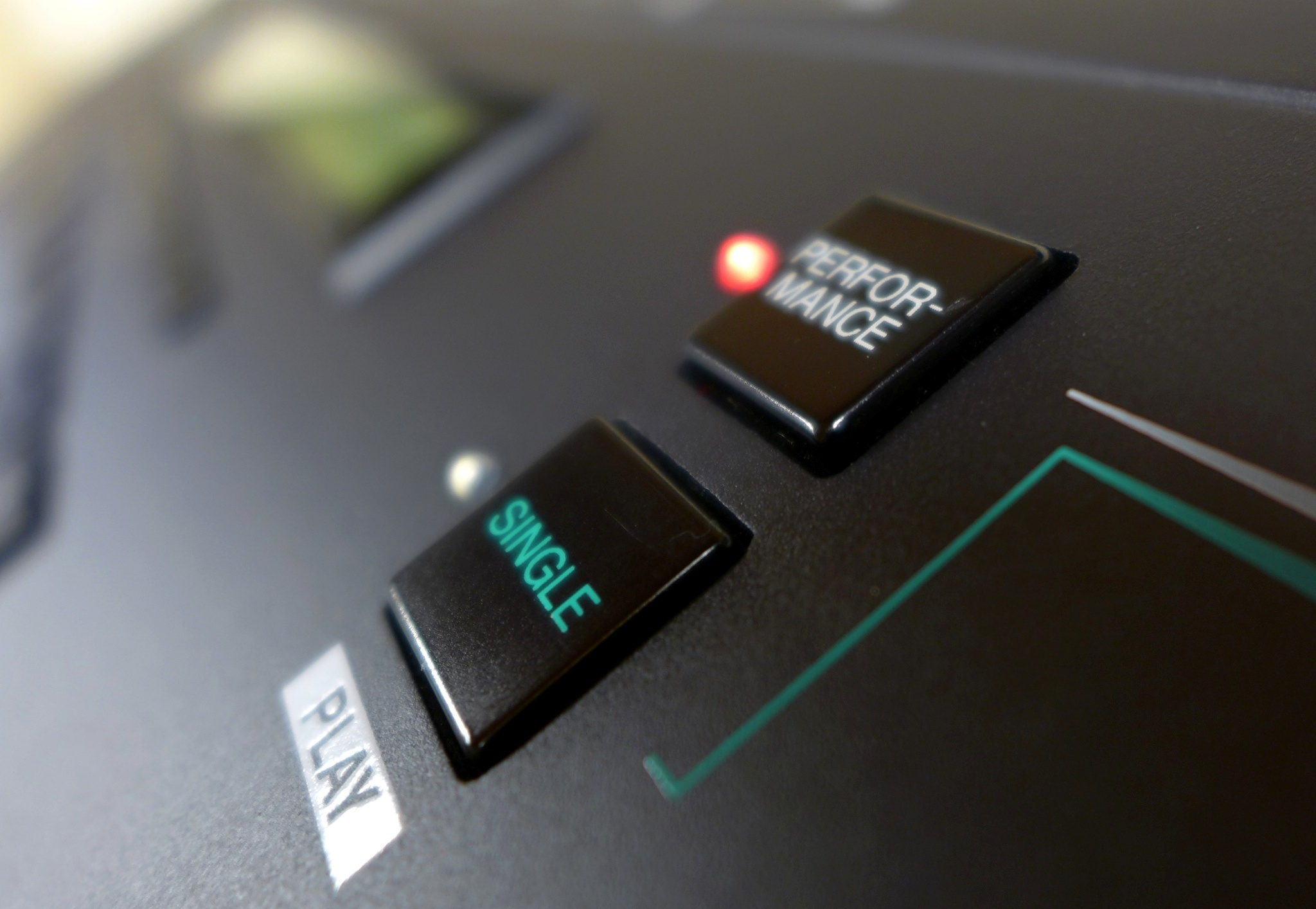

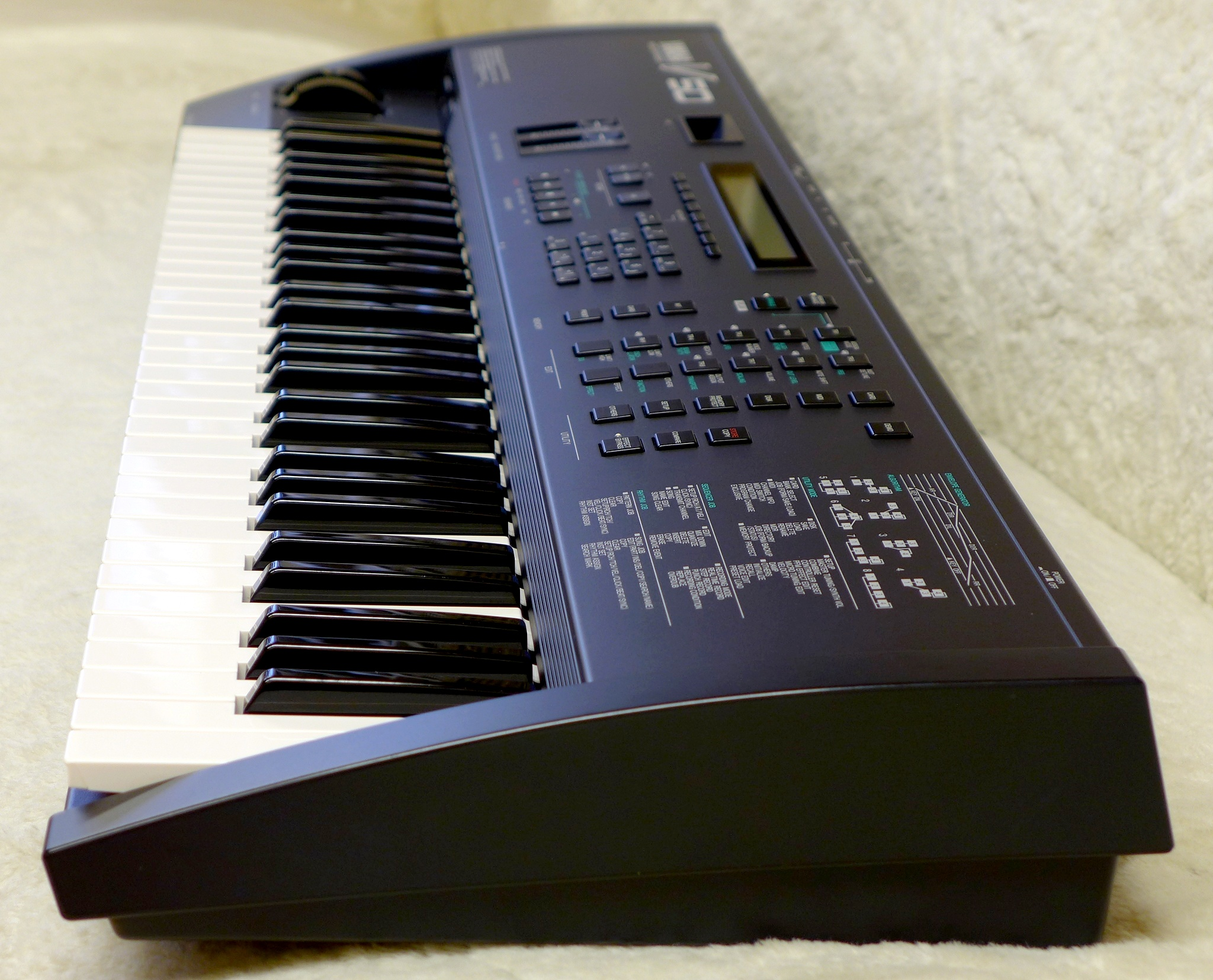

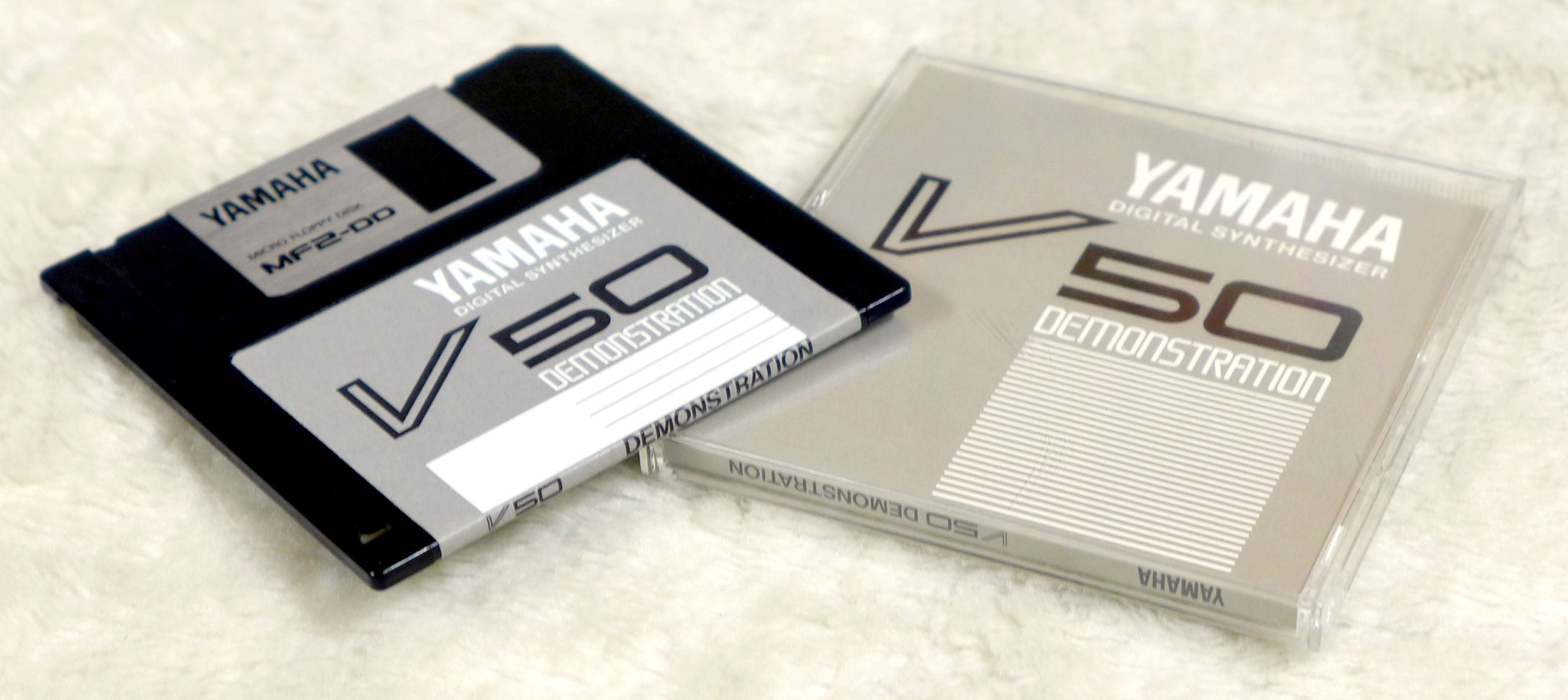
Demo disks
