= SYM Sport Rider 125i =

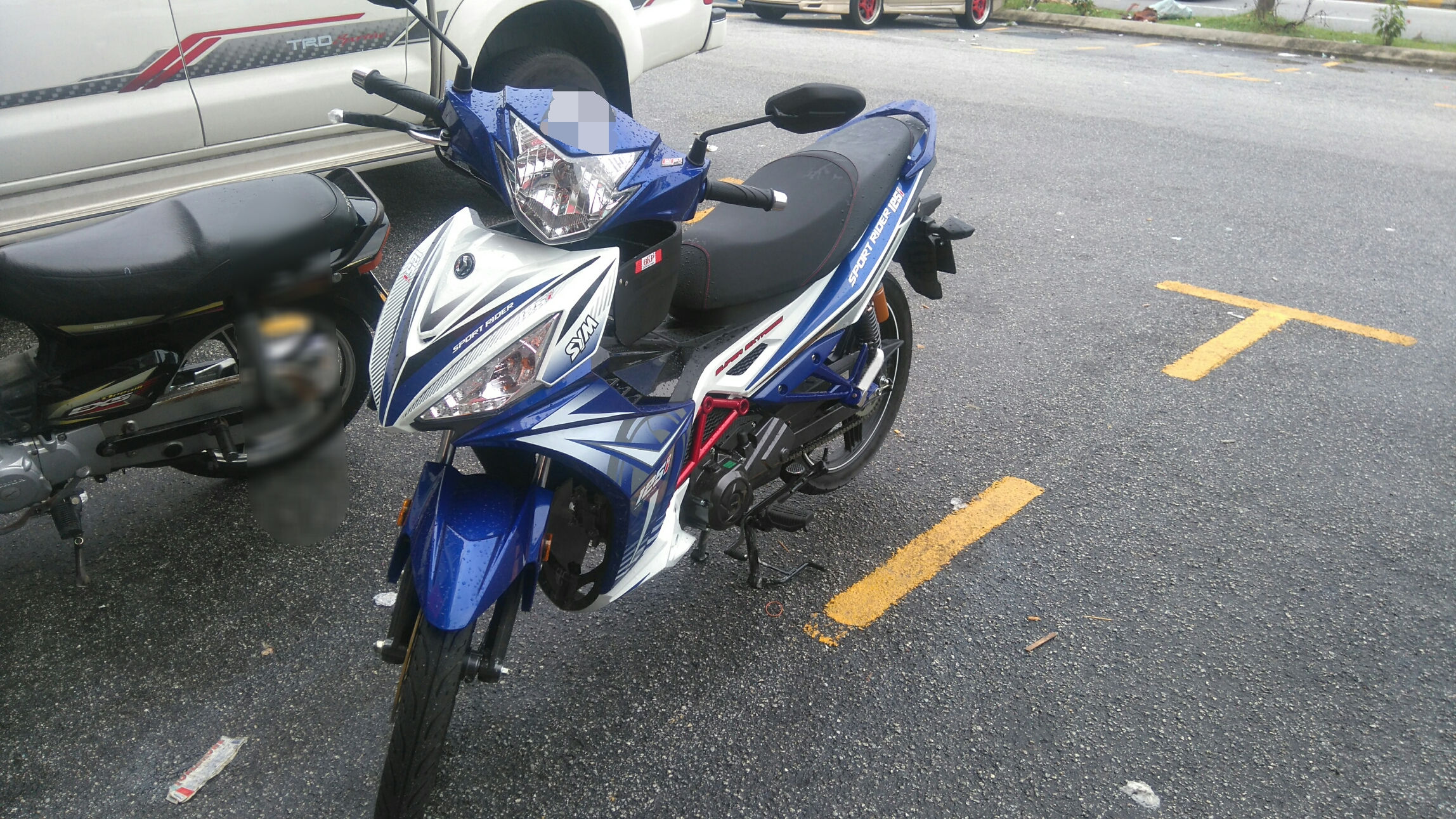
- Manufacturer: SYM Motors
- Also called: SYM StarX 125i (in Vietnam)
- Parent company: Sanyang Motor Co. Ltd.
- Production: 2016–present
- Assembly: Bukit Mertajam, Malaysia; Biên Hòa, Vietnam
- Class: Underbone
- Engine: 123 cc (7.5 cu in) SOHC 2-valve 4-stroke air-cooled
- Bore / stroke: 52.4 mm × 57 mm (2.06 in × 2.24 in)
- Compression ratio: 9.5:1
- Power: 9.5 PS (7.0 kW) @ 8,000 rpm
- Torque: 10.8 N⋅m (8.0 lb⋅ft) @ 5,500 rpm
- Ignition type: TCI
- Transmission: 4-speed rotary
- Frame type: Steel pipe backbone
- Suspension: Front: Telescopic fork Rear: Trailing swingarm
- Brakes: Front: Disc Rear: Drum
- Tires: Front: 70/90-17; Rear: 80/90-17
- Weight: 107 kg (dry)
- Fuel capacity: 4.2 L (0.92 imp gal; 1.1 US gal)
- Oil capacity: 0.8 L (0.18 imp gal; 0.21 US gal)
- Fuel consumption: 55 km/L (160 mpg_{‑imp}; 130 mpg_{‑US}) @ 90 km/h

The SYM Sport Rider 125i (also known as the SYM StarX 125i in Vietnam) is the first fuel-injected underbone motorcycle model by Taiwanese motorcycle company SYM Motors. The SYM Sport Rider 125i is powered by a fuel-injected 125 cc 4-stroke gasoline engine. It was debuted in Malaysia on 27 August 2016 before being sold in other markets like Vietnam and the Philippines.

== Model history ==
The SYM Sport Rider 125i made its global debut in Malaysia on 27 August 2016. It was developed through a collaboration between SYM Motors Taiwan and its Malaysian distributor, MForce Bike Holdings Sdn. Bhd. Later in October 2016, the Sport Rider 125i was launched as the SYM StarX 125i in Vietnam.

The SYM Sport Rider 125i is powered by an all-new 125 cc SOHC 2-valve 4-stroke ECOTECH engine with fuel injection that is capable to produce 9.5 PS (7.0 kW) of power at 8,000 rpm and 10.8 N⋅m (8.0 lb⋅ft) of torque at 5,500 rpm. The usage of fuel injection technology enables the Sport Rider to become Euro 3 emission standard compliant. The Sport Rider is also equipped with a 35-watt halogen headlight, a pair of LED daylight running lamps and LED tail lights, which are Euro 4 compliant in terms of lighting system. In addition, the Sport Rider is also equipped with a tachometer and a digital LCD panel combining a digital speedometer, a fuel gauge, a trip meter, an odometer, a digital clock and a voltmeter.

The SYM Sport Rider 125i is sold with the on the road price tags of RM 5,777.00 in Malaysia (including GST), VND 24,990,000 in Vietnam and PHP 68,800 in the Philippines.
