= Yamaha YM2414 =

Sound chip

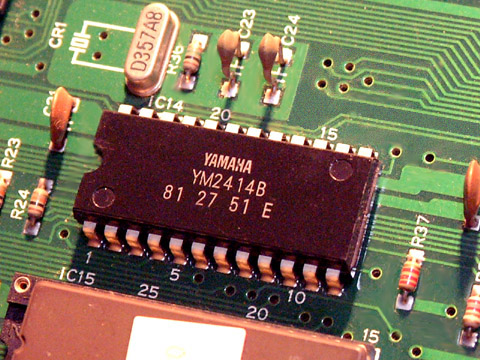
Yamaha YM2414

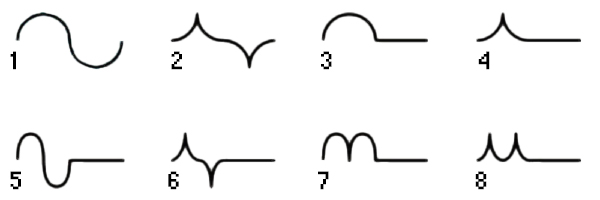
YM2414 Waveforms

The YM2414, a.k.a. OPZ, is an eight-channel sound chip developed by Yamaha. It was used in many mid-market phase/frequency modulation-based synthesizers, including Yamaha's TX81Z (the first product to feature the chip and was named after it), DX11, YS200 family, the Korg Z3 guitar synthesizer, and many other devices. A successor was released as the upgraded OPZII/YM2424, used only in the Yamaha V50.

The OPZ has the following features:

- Eight concurrent FM synthesis channels
- Four operators per channel
- Eight selectable waveforms
- Fixed-frequency mode, which can go much lower in the OPZII, enabling 0 Hz carriers or low rates for native chorusing
- Dual low frequency oscillators

== Products ==
The chip was used in the PortaTone PSR-80 and PSR-6300, the Yamaha TX81Z rack-mounted FM synthesizer, the Yamaha DX11, DSR-1000 and DSR-2000, YS-100, YS-200 and DS55 synthesizers, the TQ5 Tone Generator and the Yamaha EMT-1 half-rack FM Sound Expander module. It was also used in the Yamaha WT11 wind tone generator.

Its upgraded variant, the YM2424 (OPZII), was used exclusively in the Yamaha V50 music workstation.

== See also ==
- List of Yamaha products
