= SYM TTLBT =

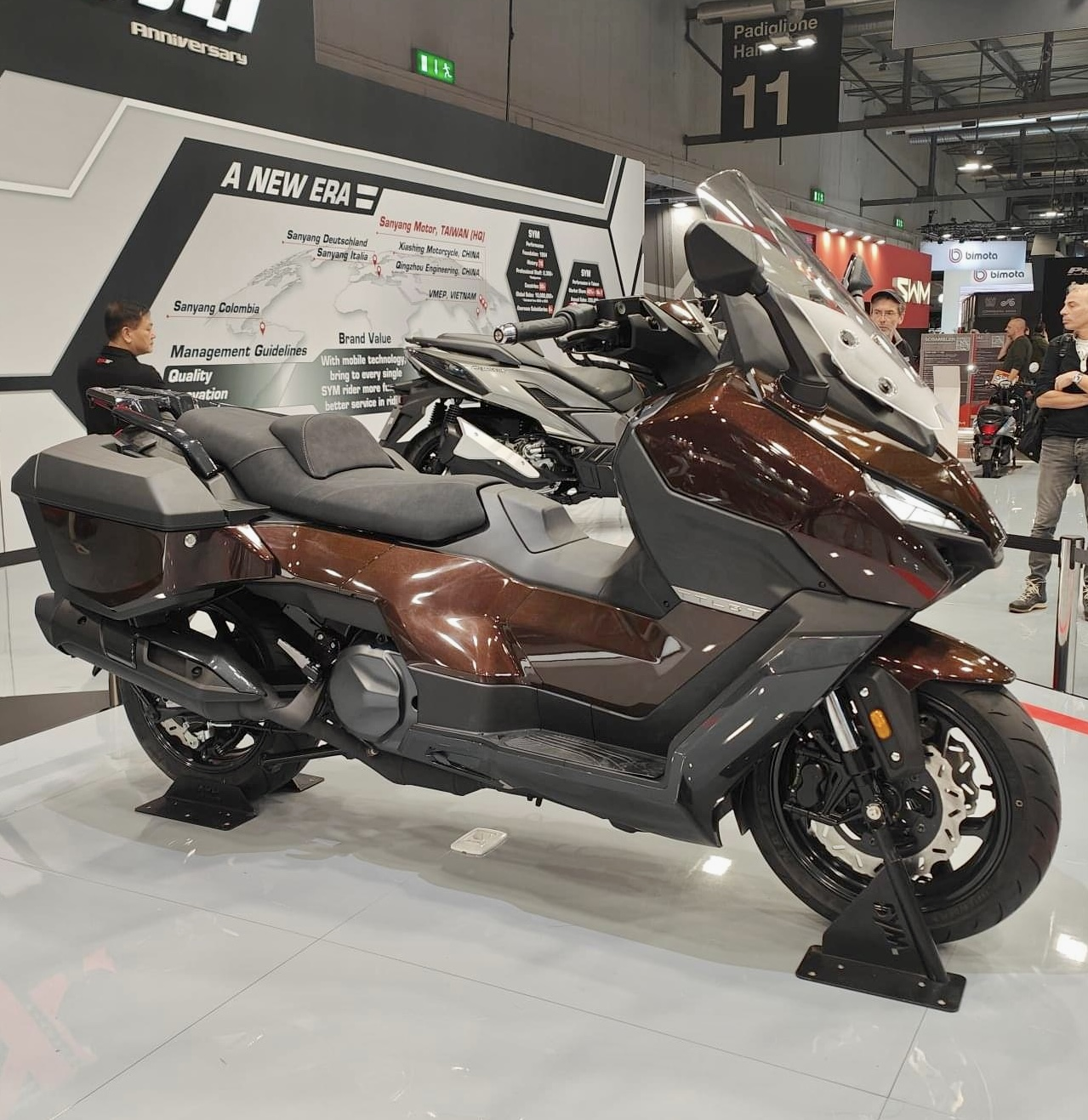
- Manufacturer: SYM Motors
- Parent company: Sanyang Motor Co. Ltd.
- Production: 2025–present
- Class: maxi-scooter
- Engine: 508 cc (31.0 cu in), parallel twin, 4-stroke liquid-cooled
- Power: 44.8 PS (33.0 kW) @ 6,750 rpm
- Torque: 49.9 N⋅m (36.8 lb⋅ft) @ 5,250 rpm
- Transmission: CVT
- Suspension: Front: Inverted front fork Rear: Multilink
- Brakes: Front: Double Disc Rear: Disc
- Tires: Front: 120/70 R15; Rear: 160/60 R15
- Weight: 254 kg (dry)
- Related: SYM Maxsym TL

The SYM TTLBT is a high-end maxi-scooter manufactured by the Taiwanese motorcycle company SYM since 2025.

== The context ==
Premiered at EICMA in November 2024, the production version was unveiled in Taiwan on February 24, 2025; the vehicle is positioned above the SYM Maxsym TL 508 in the Taiwanese manufacturer’s lineup. Unlike the Maxsym TL from which it inherits its engine, the TTLBT adopts a more motorcyclist style inspired by sport-tourers. A distinguishing feature of the TTLBT is the matrix LED headlight and the integrated side cases in the bodywork, with capacities of 14.4 and 13.6 litres, respectively. The underseat compartment offers a capacity of 37 litres and comes standard with a mounting support for a top case. Standard features include a TFT instrument panel with a 7-inch display and an Apple CarPlay system, as well as an electronically adjustable windshield and heated grips. The name "TTLBT" is derived from the union of the Italian word "Tartaruga" (turtle) and the English word "Beast".

== Technical Specifications ==
The engine is SYM’s 508 cm³ parallel twin, four-stroke, four-valve, liquid-cooled, compliant with Euro 5+ regulations. It delivers a maximum power output of 44.8 hp at 6,750 rpm and a peak torque of 49.9 Nm at 5,250 rpm. The transmission is an automatic CVT with an oil-bathed multi-disc clutch, offering two riding modes: Normal and Rain, managed via a ride-by-wire system. Standard electronic control includes the Vitesco EMS system with three settings: deactivatable traction control (TCS), cornering ABS, and Bosch MSC stability control. The frame is an evolution of the Maxsym’s design, adopting a more touring-oriented setup; it consists of a fixed engine, inverted front fork, and a rear monoshock with a progressive linkage system. The braking system features twin front discs (275 mm) and a single rear disc (275 mm). Tire specifications: front 120/70 R15, rear 160/60 R15. Dimensions: Length 2,203 mm, wheelbase 1,543 mm, width 890 mm, height 1,366 mm (1,492 mm with windshield in the highest position). Weight: 254 kg.
