= Honda Taiwan =

Taiwanese auto company

Honda Taiwan Co., Ltd.
- Company type: Subsidiary
- Traded as: Honda Taiwan
- Industry: Automotive
- Predecessor: Joint venture with Sanyang Motor
- Founded: 8 February 2002; 24 years ago
- Headquarters: Zhongshan, Taipei, Taiwan
- Number of locations: 2
- Area served: Taiwan
- Key people: Shin Saito (president)
- Brands: Honda
- Parent: Honda Motor Co. Ltd.
- Website: www.honda-taiwan.com.tw

Honda Taiwan
- Chinese: 台灣本田股份有限公司
Transcriptions
Standard Mandarin
- Hanyu Pinyin: Táiwān Běntián Gǔfèn Yǒuxiàn Gōngsī
Hakka
- Romanization: Thòi-vân Pún-thièn Kú-fun Yû-han Kûng-sṳ̂
Southern Min
- Hokkien POJ: Tâi-oân Pún-tiân Kó͘-hūn Iú-hān Kong-si

Honda Taiwan Co., Ltd. (Chinese: 台灣本田股份有限公司), a wholly owned subsidiary of Honda Motor Co. Ltd., was established in February 2002 shortly after discontinuing their local partnership with Sanyang Motor. It started productions and sales of CR-V in January 2003 then expanded to include the Accord (November 2003), Civic (2006), and Fit (2008). On November 11, 2008 Honda Taiwan celebrated assembling its 100,000th vehicle. In 2009, Honda Taiwan employed 740 people.

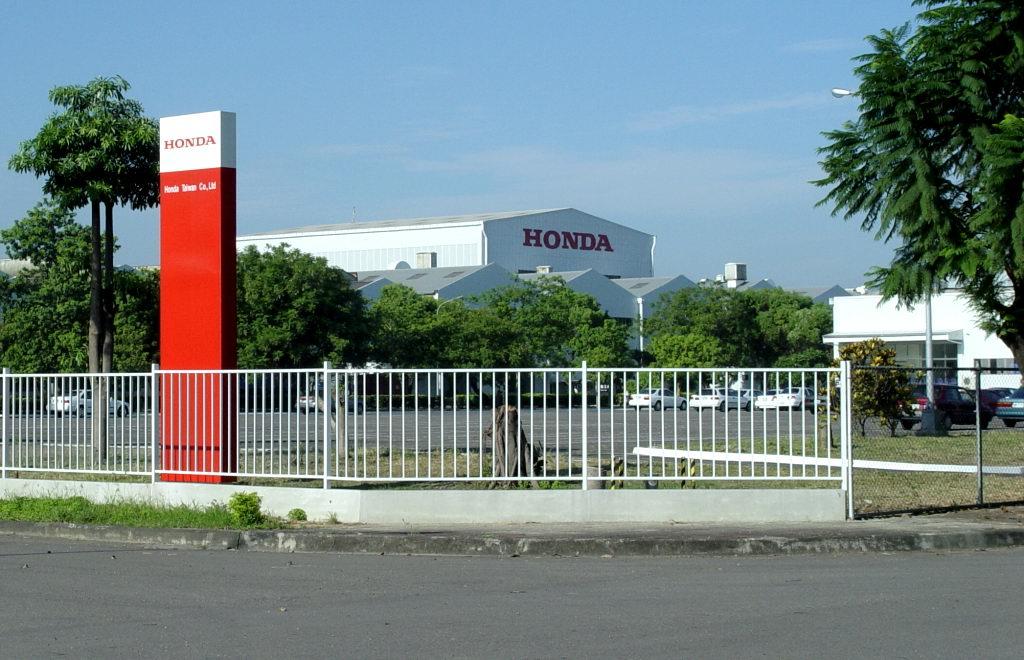
The factory of Honda Taiwan Motor Co., Ltd. in Pingtung City

Honda products for the Taiwanese market had been assembled and distributed by local motorcycle manufacturer Sanyang Industrial Co. for 41 years when the announcement was made. Taiwan was where the first overseas Honda automobiles were built, when the N600 and TN360 began assembly in 1969. Honda moved to create its own subsidiary in order to "increase competitiveness" and to "reduce production costs." The fact that Sanyang (under the SYM label) had become a successful motorcycle producer in its own right, often competing directly with Honda products, may also have had something to do with the decision. In 2001, their last full year with Sanyang as a distributor, Honda held only a 1.5% market share in Taiwan. In 2007, Honda passed Ford Lio Ho to gain fourth place in the Taiwanese automobile market and for the first six months of 2010, Honda's market share had gone up to 8.3% with the fourth place consolidated.

== Facilities ==
Pingtung City manufacturing plant produces Honda CR-V, Honda HR-V, and Honda Fit.

Hsinchu was former location of plant that manufactured both the Accord and Fit.
