= SYM VF3i =

SYM VF3i 185
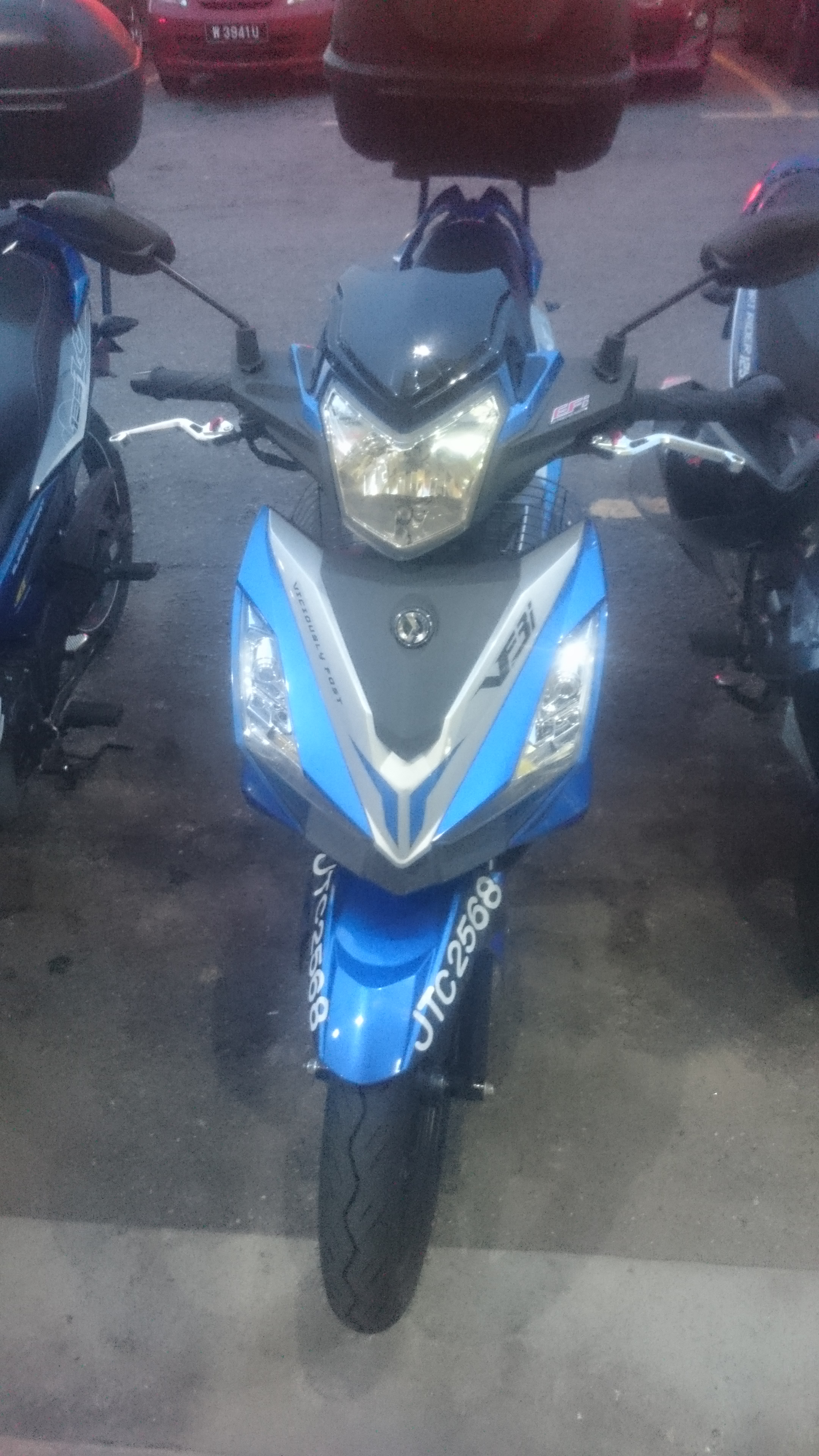
- Manufacturer: SYM Motors
- Also called: SYM Star SR 170 (in Vietnam)
- Parent company: Sanyang Motor Co. Ltd.
- Production: 2018–present
- Assembly: Bukit Mertajam, Malaysia; Biên Hòa, Vietnam
- Class: Underbone
- Engine: 174.5 cc (10.6 cu in) (Vietnamese model) & 183 cc (11.2 cu in) (Malaysian model) SOHC 4-valve 4-stroke water-cooled
- Bore / stroke: 63.5 mm × 58.7 mm (2.50 in × 2.31 in)(Malaysian model); 63.5 mm × 55.1 mm (2.50 in × 2.17 in)(Vietnamese model)
- Compression ratio: 11.1:1 (Malaysian model); 10.6:1 (Vietnamese model)
- Power: 14.489 kW (19.700 PS) @ 8,500 rpm (Malaysian model); 11.2 kW (15.2 PS) @ 8,500 rpm (Vietnamese model)
- Torque: 17.7 N⋅m (13.1 lb⋅ft) @ 7,500 rpm (Malaysian model); 13.6 N⋅m (10.0 lb⋅ft) @ 7,500 rpm (Vietnamese model)
- Ignition type: TCI
- Transmission: 6-speed
- Frame type: Steel pipe backbone
- Suspension: Front: Telescopic fork Rear: Trailing swingarm
- Brakes: Front: Disc with ABS Rear: Disc
- Tires: Front: 90/80-17; Rear: 120/70-17
- Weight: 124 kg (dry)
- Fuel capacity: 7 L (1.5 imp gal; 1.8 US gal)
- Fuel consumption: 54 km/L (150 mpg_{‑imp}; 130 mpg_{‑US}) @ 40 km/h

The SYM VF3i 185 (also known as the SYM Star SR 170i in Vietnam) is a fuel-injected underbone motorcycle model by Taiwanese motorcycle company SYM Motors. The SYM VF3i is currently the largest-engined underbone motorcycle in the world, powered by a 183 cc SOHC 4-valve water-cooled engine. It was debuted in Malaysia on 5 April 2018 before being sold in Vietnam later in December. In Vietnam, however, the VF3i is given a smaller 174.5 cc engine and is sold as the SYM Star SR 170.

== Model history ==
The news about the development of the SYM VF3i was first leaked in 2016 when it was previously known as the SYM Super Moped 175i. At that time, it was reported that SYM Motors was developing an underbone motorcycle model whose engine displacement surpasses the Honda Winner and Yamaha T-150. The Malaysian distributor of SYM motorcycles, MForce Bike Holdings Sdn. Bhd. later revealed that the SYM Super Moped would be launched during the third quarter of 2017; however, the launch date was later being pushed to the second quarter of 2018 to make way for the launch of the Benelli RFS150, also distributed by MForce Bike Holdings. The SYM Super Moped was later being renamed as the SYM VF3i 185 and was launched on 5 April 2018.

The SYM VF3i was featured during the EICMA 2018 motor show in Milan, Italy, where the featured model was shown as being equipped with anti-lock braking system (ABS), making the VF3i as the first underbone motorcycle to be equipped with ABS. However, the ABS option was not available in Malaysia.

The SYM VF3i was later launched in Vietnam on 17 December 2018 as the SYM Star SR 170. However, the SYM Star SR 170 is given a smaller 174.5 cc engine and comes with ABS as standard.
