= Yamaha TX81Z =

Digital synthesizer

TX81Z
- Manufacturer: Yamaha
- Dates: 1987-1988

Technical specifications
- Polyphony: 8
- Timbrality: 8
- Oscillator: 4 operators per voice 8 waveforms
- LFO: 2 in performance as well as dedicated vibrato(multitimbral) mode 1 in single voice mode assignable to pitch or amplitude
- Synthesis type: Digital Frequency modulation
- Aftertouch expression: yes
- Velocity expression: yes
- Storage memory: 128 factory patches 32 user patches 24 user performances
- Effects: reverb Delay, Pan and Chord.
- Hardware: YM2414 (OPZ); CPU 63B03

Input/output
- External control: MIDI

The Yamaha TX81Z is a rack-mounted (keyboard-less) frequency modulation (FM) music synthesizer, released in 1987. It is also known as a keyboard-less Yamaha DX11 (and the subsequent Yamaha V50 (music workstation)). Unlike previous FM synthesizers of the era, the TX81Z was the first to offer a range of oscillator waveforms other than just sine waves, conferring the new timbres of some of its patches when compared to older, sine-only FM synths. The TX81Z has developed a famous reputation, largely based on some of its preset bass sounds. The Yamaha DX11 keyboard synth was released the following year, offering improved editing abilities.

== Features ==
The unit is multitimbral, and has 128 ROM voices, 32 editable voice slots, and 24 editable Performance memories.

The RAM slots were rarely utilized due to the perceived high quality and usability of the original patches and the difficulty of programming new sounds with the limited front-panel interface. Among the presets is the famous LatelyBass, one of the most popular presets in synthesizer history.

The TX81Z is backwards-compatible with sound patches developed for Yamaha's DX21, DX27, and DX100 synthesizers. It is also very similar, and almost completely patch-compatible, to the DX11 synthesizer, which is essentially a TX81Z with a velocity and pressure-sensing keyboard and a pitch envelope.

== Usage ==
TX 81Z examples
The many faces of the TX81Z

Some say the prevalence of the TX81Z's presets was also because of the difficulty in creating new patches. Creating new sounds from the unit's front panel is possible, but numerous nested parameters must be navigated by way of 11 buttons and a backlit 16 character, 2-line LCD. However, several personal computer-based editing applications have been developed since its release. The Dutch company KissBox released in 2013 a TX81Z editor based on RTP-MIDI communication, which makes the hardware synth appear as a VST plugin, while being controlled over a network link in real-time.

The TX81Z was designed as a low-cost FM machine and has always been relatively inexpensive compared to most other FM synthesizers. The TX81Z is built around a single FM chip, the Yamaha YM2414B aka OPZ, while 6-op machines like the DX7 have separate envelope/frequency and algorithm/wave chips and created LFOs in software; this large workload in the OPZ is probably why it has fewer operators and notes. A 63B03 CPU allocates voices and generates auxiliary LFOs, in parallel with MIDI and user interface, which might be why e.g. a pitch EG was omitted; the later DX11 splits responsibilities between 2 CPUs and adds a PEG.

The low price made the TX81Z popular with many producers on a tight budget, and is still used by part-time house and acid house producers. Eliot Kennedy uses it for one purpose, a "classic dancefloor bass sound.". Producer Babyface at one point had two units in his studio, both of which he kept set to the preset "LatelyBass", one detuned from the other; this expanded version of the preset became a part of his signature sound. It is also known for its use to make the original "donk" sample characteristic of genres like hardbass.
