= Yamaha DX100 =

Commuter motorcycle made 1975-1981

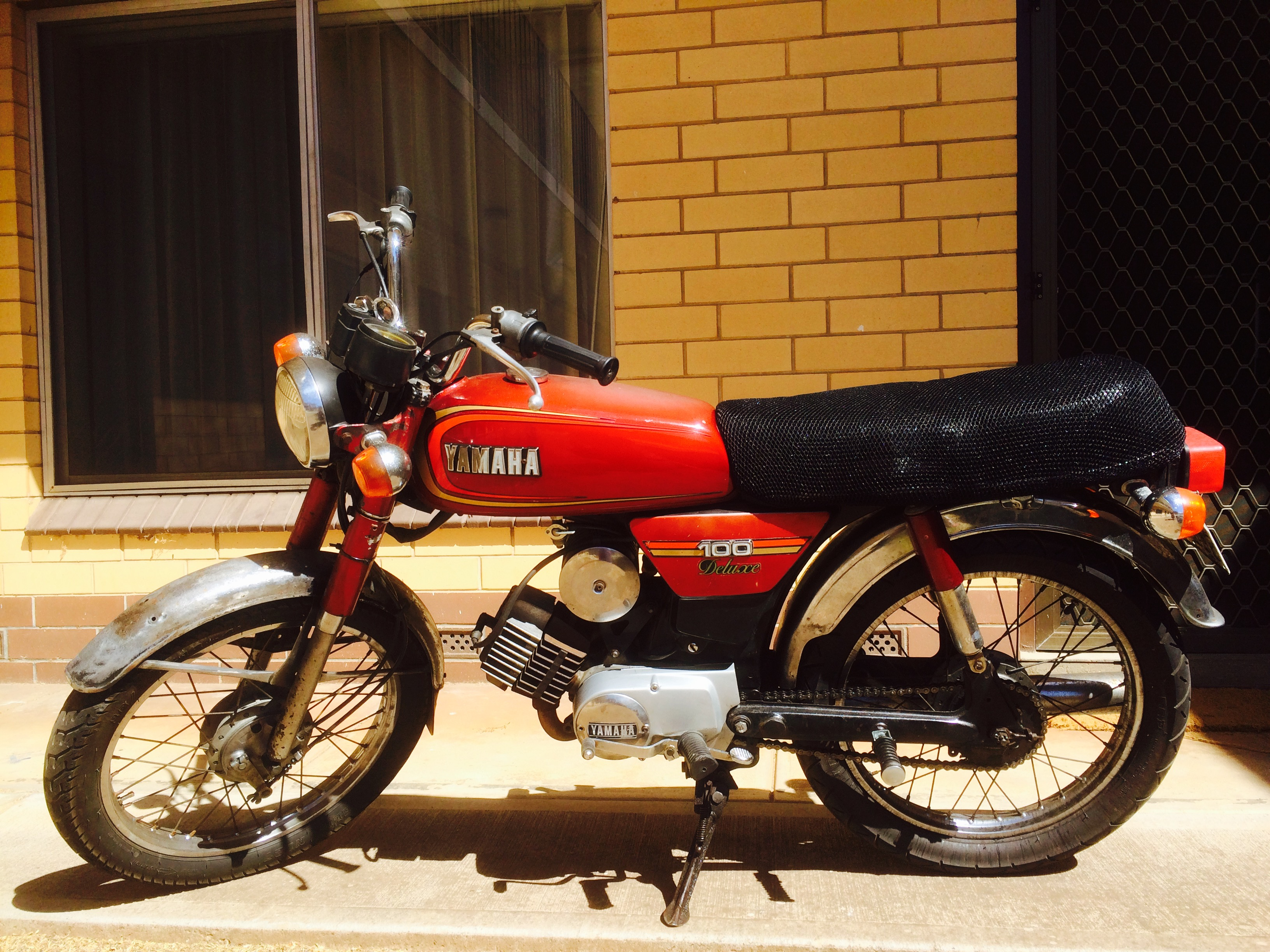
- Manufacturer: Yamaha Motors
- Parent company: Yamaha
- Successor: Yamaha RX 115
- Class: Standard
- Engine: 100 cc (6.1 cu in) Two-stroke single
- Top speed: c. 100 km/h (62 mph)
- Power: 8 HP
- Ignition type: CB Points
- Transmission: 4 speed (All up: N-1-2-3-4)
- Brakes: Drum
- Oil capacity: 600 ml
- Related: Yamaha YB100

Yamaha DX100 was a 100cc, air-cooled, two-stroke commuter motorcycle manufactured by Yamaha Motor Company from 1975 to 1981.

It had a 4-speed gearbox utilizing an all-up configuration with a toe-heel shifter. The engine produced approximately 8 hp with in a narrow RPM band. The bike was equipped with front and rear drum brakes. Electrics were 6 volt, and two-stroke oil is injected to cylinder through Auto-Lube.

Top speed with a single rider was approximately 90 km/h (56 mph). Although good for city commuting, the bike lacked power and speed to keep up with freeway speeds.

Yamaha DX100 was very closely related to the more popular Yamaha YB100 with slightly different graphics and fuel tank shape. However, both are mechanically the same.

Yamaha DX100 was aimed against competitors such as Suzuki A100 and Suzuki A80.
