= Automatic lubrication =

Lubrication system on a two-stroke engine

Automatic lubrication (also called autolube or auto-lube) refers to a lubrication system on a two-stroke engine, in which the oil is automatically mixed with fuel and manual oil-fuel pre-mixing is not necessary. The oil is contained in a reservoir that connects to a small oil pump in the engine, which needs to be periodically refilled.

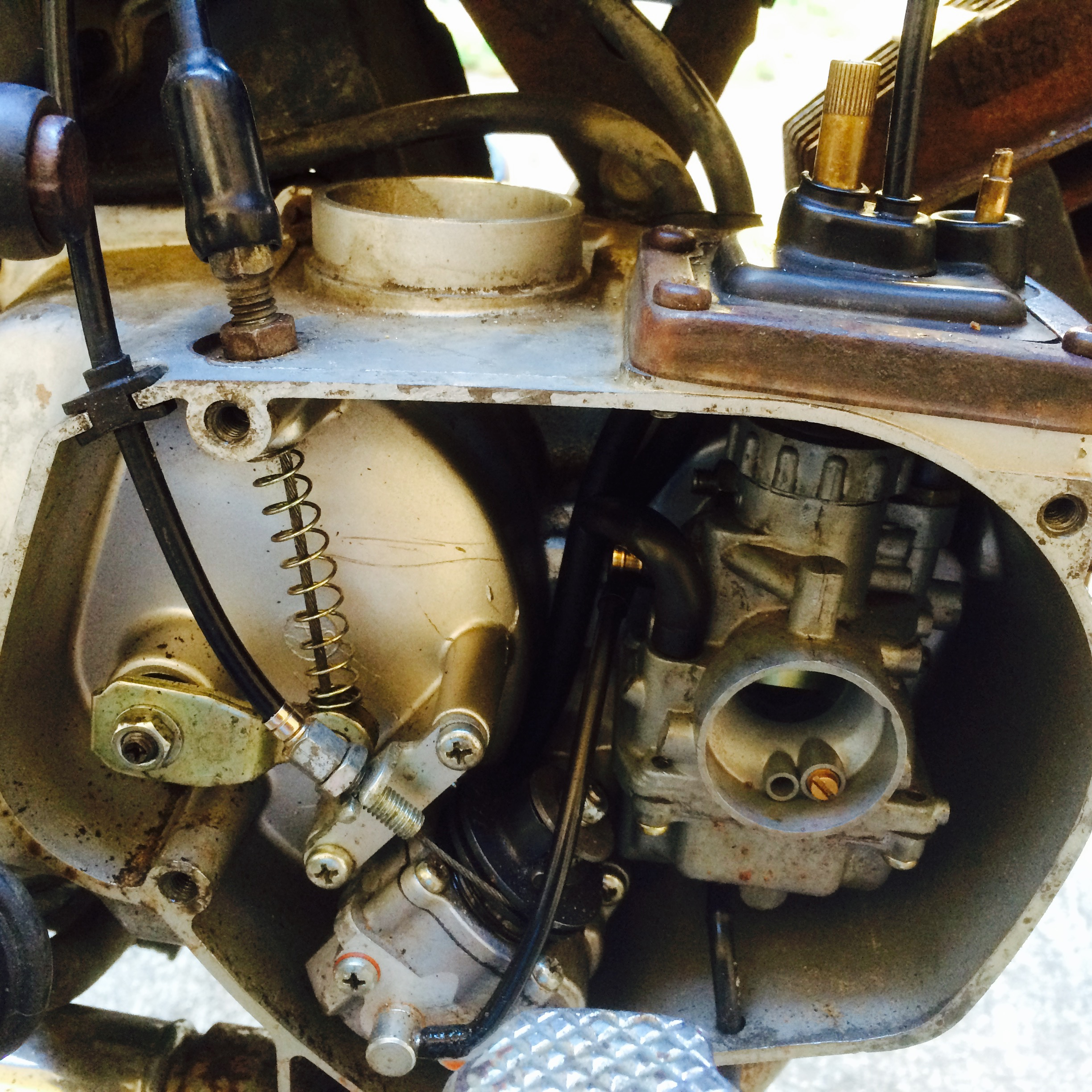
Oil injection pump on a Yamaha DX100- just behind the carburettor (visible on the left) It is the primary component of two-stroke automatic lubrication system. Amount of two-stroke oil injected by the pump depends on the throttle position. A cable from the throttle is connected to the oil pump indicating throttle's position. A tube ensures flow of oil from the reservoir to the oil pump.

This system is commonly used for motorcycles as it eliminates the need of pre-mixing fuel and two-stroke oil. Earlier Vespa models are an example where pre-mixing of two-stroke oil is required. Automatic lubrication was introduced for motorcycles by Velocette in 1913.

An example of application of automatic lubrication system is Suzuki AX100 motorcycle. The motorcycle has a separate oil reservoir on its right side which supplies the cylinder with two-stroke oil proportional to engine speed.

== Advantages ==
1. Consistent lubrication and oil consumption is reduced greatly
2. More effective lubrication results because the oil enters the engine in larger size droplets
3. There is much less unwanted carbon deposited on the spark plugs, cylinder heads, pistons and exhaust system.
4. There is much less exhaust smoke
5. Refueling is simplified

== Disadvantages ==
1. The system is more complicated compared to manual pre-mixing, although it is easier for the end user.
2. If for any reason the oil pump fails to operate properly, chance of damaging the engine is very high.
3. The two-stroke oil tank in scooters and motorcycles is usually hidden from direct view of the rider and needs filling up occasionally. Without any indicator to indicate oil level, it is possible for a novice rider to forget to fill up the oil tank. This can end up starving the engine of oil and cause damage.

== See also ==
- Automatic lubrication system
