= Yamaha YM2151 =

Sound chip developed by Yamaha

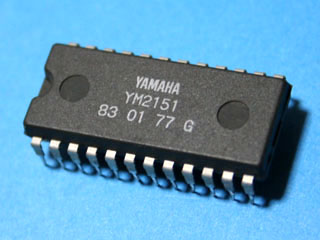
Yamaha YM2151

The Yamaha YM2151, also known as OPM (FM Operator Type-M) is an eight-channel, four-operator sound chip developed by Yamaha. It was Yamaha's first single-chip FM synthesis implementation, being created originally for some of the Yamaha DX series of keyboards (DX21, DX27, and DX100). Yamaha also used it in some of their budget-priced electric pianos, such as the YPR-7, -8, and -9.

== Uses ==
The YM2151 was used in many arcade game system boards, starting with Marble Madness for the Atari System 1 arcade board in 1984, then Sega arcade system boards from 1985, and then arcade games from Konami, Capcom, Data East, Irem, and Namco, as well as Williams pinball machines, with its heaviest use in the mid-to-late 1980s. It was also used in Sharp's X1 and X68000 home computers. The Commander X16 8-bit "modern retro" hobbyist computer also contains a YM2151 chip onboard for sound generation.

The chip was used in the Yamaha SFG-01 and SFG-05 FM Sound Synthesizer units. These are expansion units for Yamaha MSX computers and were already built into some machines such as the Yamaha CX5M. Later SFG-05 modules contain the YM2164 (OPP), an almost identical chip with only minor changes to control registers. The SFGs were followed by the Yamaha FB-01, a standalone version powered exclusively by the YM2164.

== Technical details ==
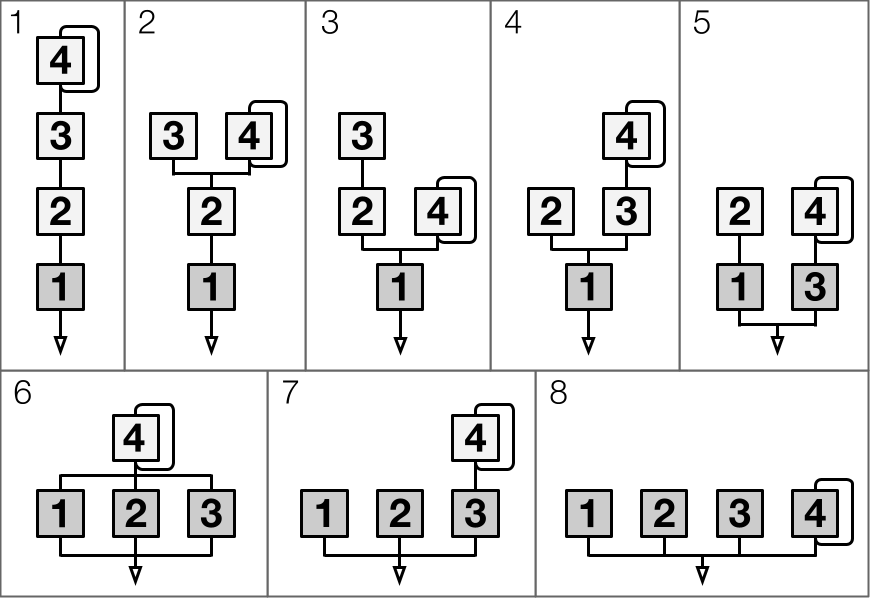
The algorithms available in all of Yamaha's 4-operator FM synths, including the YM2151 and all subsequent 4-operator FM chips, based on that of the DX9

The YM2151 uses a form of sound synthesis known as FM synthesis, achieved by phase modulating the instantaneous frequency of each waveform via a modulator. The chip contains eight concurrent FM synthesis channels (or voices), and each channel contains a number of operators that can be connected in a variety of ways, using a modified ADSR envelope along with rate scaling, frequency multiplication, and detuning settings. There are four operators per channel, each of them containing a sine wave oscillator and an envelope generator. These operators can be rearranged into eight different connections (or "FM Algorithms" in Yamaha terminology) of the four operators for sound generation. The algorithms are based on that of the Yamaha DX9, which uses eight out of the 32 algorithms of the DX7 but modified for use with four operators, with the YM2151 and later four operator FM chips using a slightly modified operator arrangement for the third algorithm. The fourth operator on the eighth channel can also be swapped out for a variable-frequency noise channel for noise generation.

The YM2151 was paired with either a YM3012 stereo DAC or a YM3014 monophonic DAC so that the output of its FM tone generator could be supplied to speakers as analog audio.

== See also ==
- VGM – an audio file format for multiple video game platforms
- Yamaha YM2164
- Yamaha YM2612
