= James Newton Howard & Friends =

Studio album by James Newton Howard
- Released: 1984
- Recorded: December 16, 17, and 19, 1983
- Studios: Sheffield Lab Studios at MGM, Culver City
- Genres: Jazz fusion; instrumental
- Label: Sheffield Lab
- Producer: Bill Schnee

James Newton Howard & Friends is an album by keyboardist and composer James Newton Howard with members of the band Toto.

In January 1983, James Newton Howard, David Paich, and Steve Porcaro demonstrated the then "new" Yamaha DX7 synthesizer for the NAMM show and convention in Anaheim, California. In the audience were Sheffield engineers Doug Sax and Bill Schnee, who upon hearing the incredible virtuosity and innovation of the electronic music, concluded that Sheffield Lab should be a part of this new technology and capture it direct-to-disc.

== Background ==
According to executive producer Doug Sax from the album's liner notes:

"My distrust of things new is the result of my experience – not merely my advancing age. Particularly in matters audio, I have found so many examples of the new and improved to be inferior to the old and obsolete that I am forced to remind myself, 'Just because it's new doesn't mean it's bad.' When Bill Schnee came to me in early January 1983 exclaiming that he had 'something new' for Sheffield to record, I exhibited cautious enthusiasm – cautious because it was new, and enthusiastic because I know him to possess impeccable taste in music. 'Yamaha has developed a new series of digital synthesizers and has commissioned James Newton Howard, David Paich, and Steve Porcaro to compose and demonstrate new music on these instruments at the NAMM convention in Anaheim.' 'Just electronic instruments?' I squeaked. 'No,' consoled Schnee, 'they're going to have Jeff Porcaro on drums and a percussionist.' As we approached Anaheim, I started to think that this could be real good. I was stunned, Schnee exulted, 'This is new (that word again) and important music – it would make a great Sheffield Lab record.' I agreed. More than exciting and inventive, I was most of all bowled over by a special feel and propulsion that defied you to not move your body. It was agreed by all that a Sheffield Lab record should be made of this music.

Actually getting these guys into the studio proved to be another matter. A May recording date was set and later cancelled. 'Got to get out our new Toto album.' 'I can do it in July, but David will be in London.' 'James will be tied up producing a new album.' Schnee pushed and shoved, 'Sheffield has got to have a new album for the January 1984 CES in Las Vegas. The last possible moment that we can record and still make that deadline is December 16th.' 'OK' comes the word through channels, 'we'll give you one weekend.' Now the phone calls started in a flurry, but this time they were trying to reach us – even their manager was calling. Bill met regularly with Steve Haselton, our chief engineer, outlining what he would need. Haselton sweated over our new 32-channel console, little realizing we would be using every inch of it."

== Recording ==
During the sessions, Sheffield ran four cutting lathes (on which the pitch was manually controlled), plus the finest digital and analog tape and machines available. The only acoustic elements on the album were the drums of Jeff Porcaro, the percussion of his father, Joe Porcaro, and a grand piano played by David Paich. All the other sounds were produced by an elaborate layering of 9 separate Yamaha DX7, DX9 and GS1 synthesizers, all played, mixed and recorded live to two-track.

== Track listing ==
All tracks are written by David Paich, except where noted.

Side one
No.	Title	Writer(s)	Length
1.	"Caesar"		3:20
2.	"Gone Buttlefishin'"	Paich, James Newton Howard	4:08
3.	"She"	Paich, Steve Porcaro	2:26
4.	"L'Daddy"		2:56

Side two
No.	Title	Writer(s)	Length
5.	"Tandoori"	Paich, J. Howard, S. Porcaro, Joe Porcaro	1:10
6.	"Borealis"	Howard	0:44
7.	"E Minor Shuffle"		3:12
8.	"Slippin' Away II"		2:50
9.	"Amuseum"	J. Howard, Wendy Smith Howard	4:52
Total length:			25:38

Professional ratings
Review scores
Source	Rating
Allmusic	3/5 stars

== Personnel ==
Adapted from the album's liner notes.

- James Newton Howard – synthesizers
- David Paich – synthesizers, grand piano
- Steve Porcaro – synthesizers
- Jeff Porcaro – drums
- Joe Porcaro – percussion

=== Technical ===
- Produced and engineered by Bill Schnee
- Executive producers – Doug Sax and Lincoln Mayorga
- Assistant engineer – Jack Puig
- Sheffield Lab chief engineer – Steve Haselton
- Engineering technician – Tom Pessagno
- Keyboard technician – Ed Simeone
- Album coordinator – Linda Jones
- Refocillation services – Andrew Teton
- Design – Richard C. Runyon and Julie Morris
- Cover and liner photos – William Hawkes
- Insert photos – Kevin Brooks and Marilyn Brooks
- Liner notes – Doug Sax
