= Yamaha DX1 =

Synthesizer

DX1
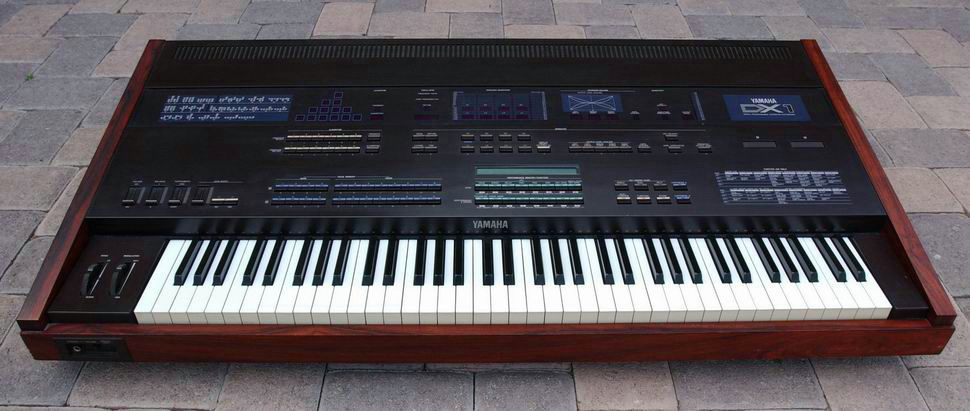
- Yamaha DX1
- Manufacturer: Yamaha
- Dates: 1983 to 1985
- Price: JP¥ 1,950,000 US$ 13,900

Technical specifications
- Polyphony: 32 voices in single or split mode 16 voices in dual mode
- Timbrality: Monotimbral; Bitimbral in split mode
- Oscillator: 6 operators
- LFO: 1
- Synthesis type: Digital frequency modulation
- Filter: none
- Attenuator: 6 envelope generators
- Aftertouch expression: Yes
- Velocity expression: Yes
- Storage memory: two sets of 4 banks of 8 voices (A and B channel, total 64), 8 banks of 8 performance combinations
- Effects: none
- Hardware: 2x YM21280 (OPS) operator chip 2x YM21290 (ES) envelope generator

Input/output
- Keyboard: DX-1: 73 with velocity and polyphonic aftertouch DX-5: 76 with velocity and channel aftertouch
- Left-hand control: pitch-bend and modulation wheels
- External control: MIDI

The Yamaha DX1 is the top-level member of Yamaha's prolific DX series of FM synthesizers. The DX1 has two sets of the synthesizer chipset used in the DX7, allowing either double the polyphony, split of two voices, or dual (layered) instrument voices. It also has double the voice memory of the DX7. It has an independent voice bank for each of two synthesizer channels ("sound engines"). Each of 64 performance combinations can be assigned a single voice number, or a combination of two voice numbers - one from channel A and one from channel B.

== Notable features ==
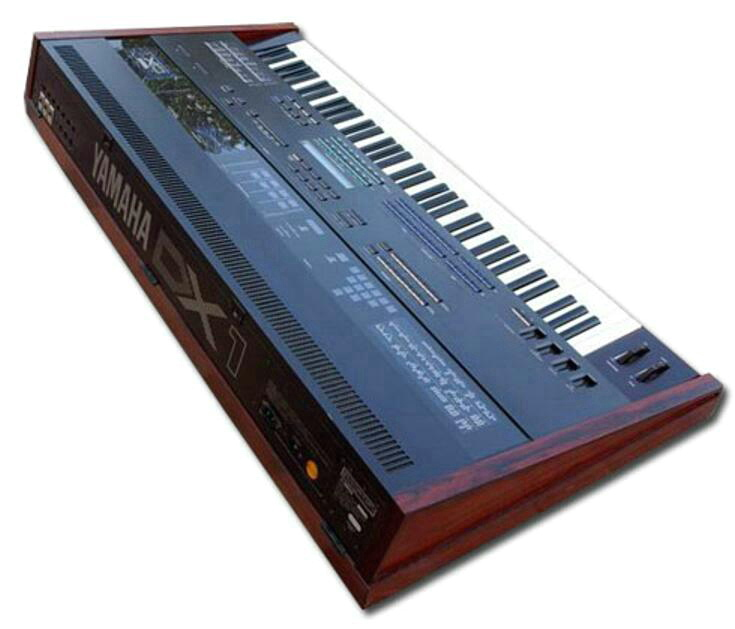
A DX1's rear panel.

=== Visual ===
The DX1 was enclosed in a handmade Brazilian rosewood case and was played with a 73-key weighted wooden keyboard with polyphonic aftertouch. On the left side of the front panel, a printed algorithm chart provided an overview of the 32 selectable algorithms and their associated operator structuring.

The DX1 also used solid push-buttons rather than the membrane buttons found on the DX7, with them containing individual LEDs to indicate current status.

=== Controls ===
Compared to the DX5 and the DX7, the DX1 had more displays that enhanced accessibility and programmability.

==== Performance section ====
The performance section had a backlit LCD (40 × 2 characters) which displayed selected programs in Single, Dual, or Split mode, as well as LFO settings and other voice-specific parameters.

==== Algorithm panel ====
The algorithm panel had a thirteen single-character 7-segment numeric displays for indicating the selected algorithm, by providing position and relationships of all active operators, as each on these displays were linked to neighbouring ones via individual stripe-style LEDs; the top display showed the of feedback and the bottom one showed the algorithm number.

==== Oscillator panel ====
The oscillator panel contained two LEDs for indicating frequency ratio (top) or fixed frequency (bottom) in Hz mode, a single LED to indicate positive or negative detune, one single-character numeric display (top) for detune amount, and one four-character numeric display (bottom) for value (ratio or exact frequency) of the selected frequency mode.

==== Envelope panel ====
The envelope panel had two LEDs for indicating either centre pitch (left) or amplitude level mode (right), eight double-character numeric displays for showing each individual envelope parameter, and four 16-segment bar-style LEDs that graphically displayed either rates (in centre pitch mode) or levels (in amplitude mode).

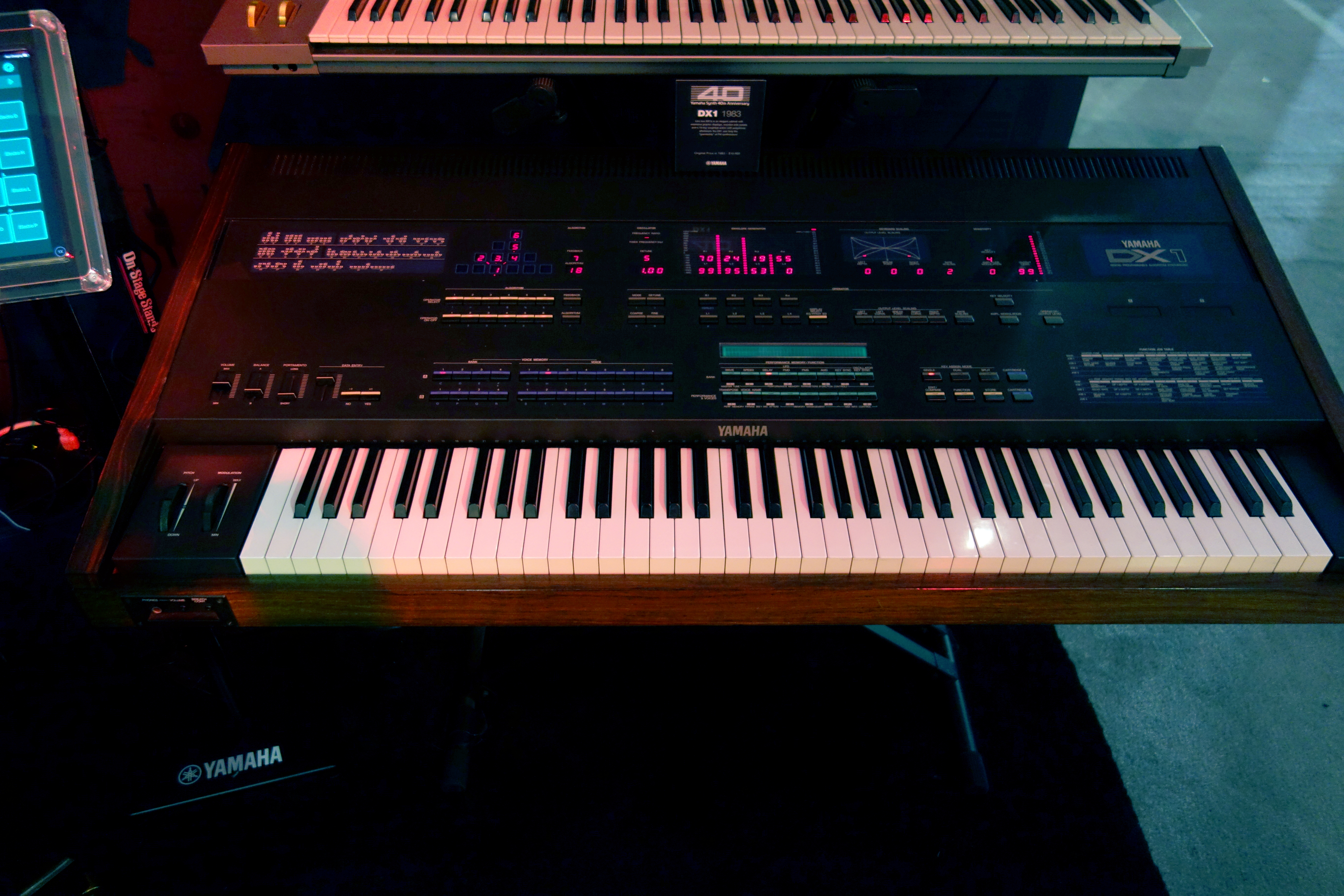
A DX1 at 2015 NAMM Show Yamaha booth, showing its display features

==== Keyboard scaling panel ====
The keyboard scaling panel had eight individual LEDs indicating selected curve response, three double-character numeric displays showing (from left to right) left depth, break point, and right depth values. The panel also had a single-character numeric display for showing rate scaling.

==== Sensitivity panel ====
The sensitivity panel had two single-character numeric displays showing key velocity (top) and amplitude modulation (bottom), one double-character numeric display showing output level, and one 16-segment bar-style LED that graphically displayed the output level.

== Sales ==
During its production year in 1985, only 140 DX1 units were produced with a retail value of US $13,900 (US$41,600 adjusted with inflation).

== Legacy ==
=== Notable users ===
- Vince Clarke
- Depeche Mode
- Dire Straits
- Herbie Hancock
- Elton John
- Kitarō
- New Order (notably on their tracks "True Faith" and "1963")
- Tears for Fears

=== Derivatives ===
The Yamaha DX5 is a derivative of the DX1, introduced in 1985 with a list price of US$3,495. It has the same synth engine, but lacks the DX1's fully weighted keys, polyphonic aftertouch, aesthetics (rosewood case and wooden keyboard), and user interface features (parameter displays). It includes 76 keys with channel aftertouch and slightly improved MIDI features. Programming on a DX1 is still a little easier than on a DX5 because of its extensive parameter displays, but in general both are easier to program than a DX7, because they have larger displays as well as dedicated buttons for some programming tasks.

=== Reissues ===
In 2019, the software instrument company UVI released the plugin bundle FM Suite containing recreations of multiple FM synths, including the DX1, DX21, DS-8, TQ5, FVX-1, TX81Z, DX100, and the GS2.

At NAMM 2025, Behringer announced the BX1, an unofficial reissue of the DX1 that added CS-80 inspired analog filters, modern effects, and 32-voice polyphony.
