= Yamaha YM2164 =

Sound chip developed by Yamaha

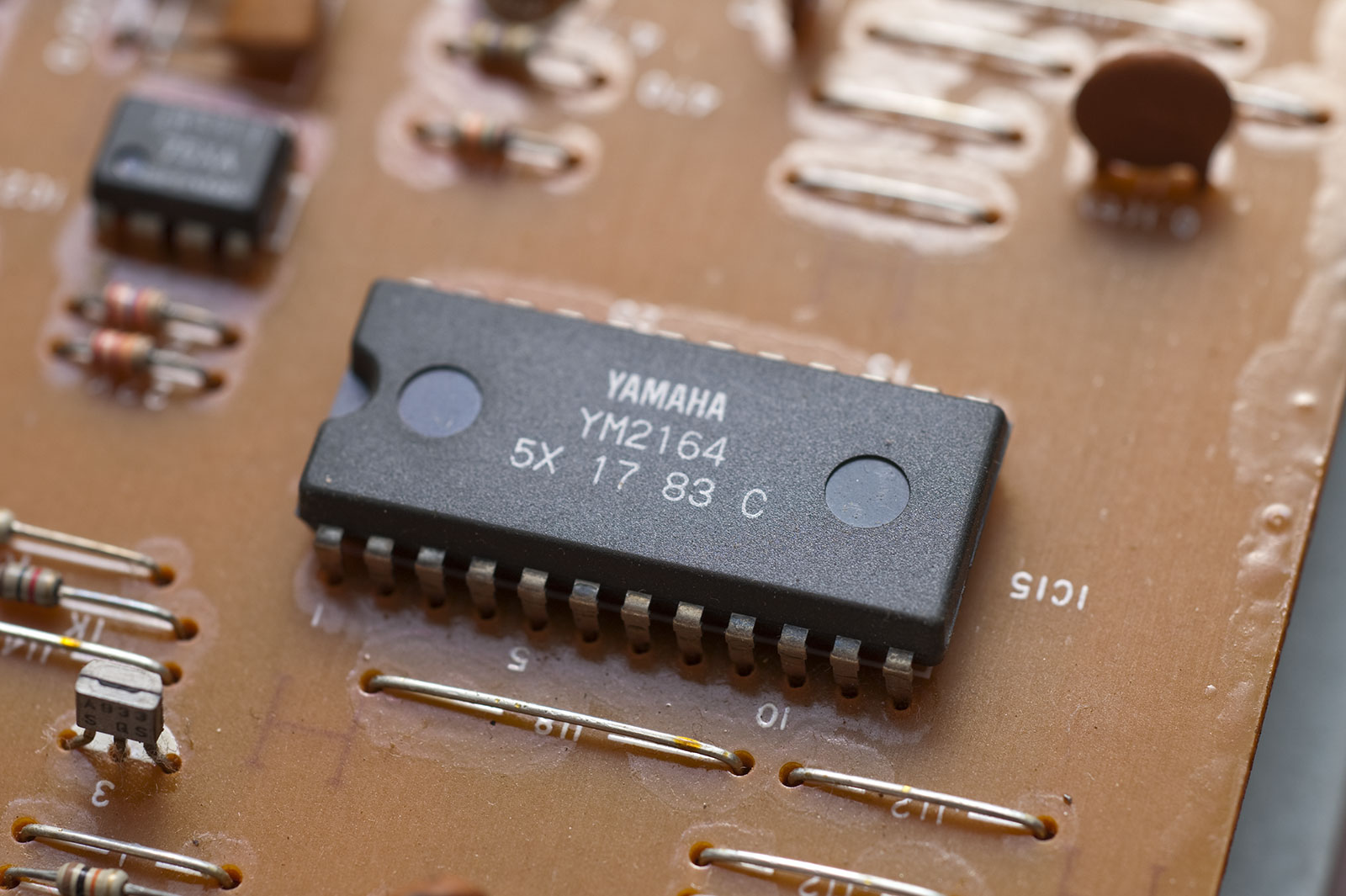
Yamaha YM2164

The Yamaha YM2164, a.k.a. OPP (FM Operator Type P), is an FM synthesis sound chip developed by Yamaha, an enhanced version of their YM2151 (a.k.a. OPM). The OPP was used in various MIDI-based synthesizers by Yamaha - DX21, DX27, DX100, SFG-05, FB-01 (a standalone SFG-05) - plus several licensed products: the IBM Music Feature Card (which is effectively an FB-01 on an ISA card) and Korg's DS-8 and Korg 707.

The YM2164 has the following features:

- Eight concurrent FM synthesis channels (voices) that may all be set to different timbres
- Four operators per channel, all generating sine waves at configurable frequencies and powers
- Eight options for routing those four operators to perform FM synthesis (via phase modulation) or simple additive synthesis
- A low frequency oscillator running 1 of 4 waveforms, mappable to pitch on a per-channel basis and/or amplitude on a per-operator basis

Compared to the OPM, the OPP has the same pinout and functional features but some minor changes to control registers. Differences are the test register address (9) and 8 undocumented registers (0-7). Due to how the FB-01 and IBM MFC hardware use those registers, swapping an OPM into these hosts does not operate correctly.

While the OPP was available for use by IBM and Korg, the chips were unavailable for purchase outside of Yamaha, compared to the almost identical and widely available OPM, which found its way into countless arcade game PCBs from the 1980s to 1990s as well as some home computers such as the X1 and X68000.

== See also ==
- Yamaha CX5M
- Yamaha YM2151
- Yamaha YM3812
- Yamaha YM2413
