= Yamaha DX9 =

Synthesizer

- Manufacturer: Yamaha
- Dates: 1983
- Price: £899 GBP $1395 US

Technical specifications
- Polyphony: 16 notes
- Timbrality: monotimbral
- Oscillator: 4 (Sine), 8 algorithms
- LFO: 1 Saw Up, Saw Down, Sine, Square, Triangle, Delay, Key Sync Sample & Hold
- Synthesis type: Digital FM
- Filter: None
- Storage memory: 20-Voice internal memory

Input/output
- Keyboard: 61 non-weighted keys
- Left-hand control: Modulation wheel, pitch wheel
- External control: Breath controller, MIDI in, out, thru, Footswitch (portamento and sustain), Foot controller (volume)

The Yamaha DX9 is a spin off synthesizer of the family of the DX7 built by Yamaha. It uses FM synthesis and has 16 note polyphony; however, it only has four FM operators for sound generation compared with six on the DX7 (without alternative firmware ROM). It is the least complex of the DX range of synthesizers and has only 20 on board memory locations.

== Typical sounds ==
The DX9 contains 20 pre-programmed synthesizer sounds ("voices") which include: brass, string sounds, piano, organ and synth sounds.

== Storage ==
User created voices (sounds) can be saved on cassette tape for later use.

== See also ==
- Yamaha DX1
- Yamaha DX7
- Yamaha DX11
- Yamaha DX21
