= Yamaha CX5M =

Synthesizer computer

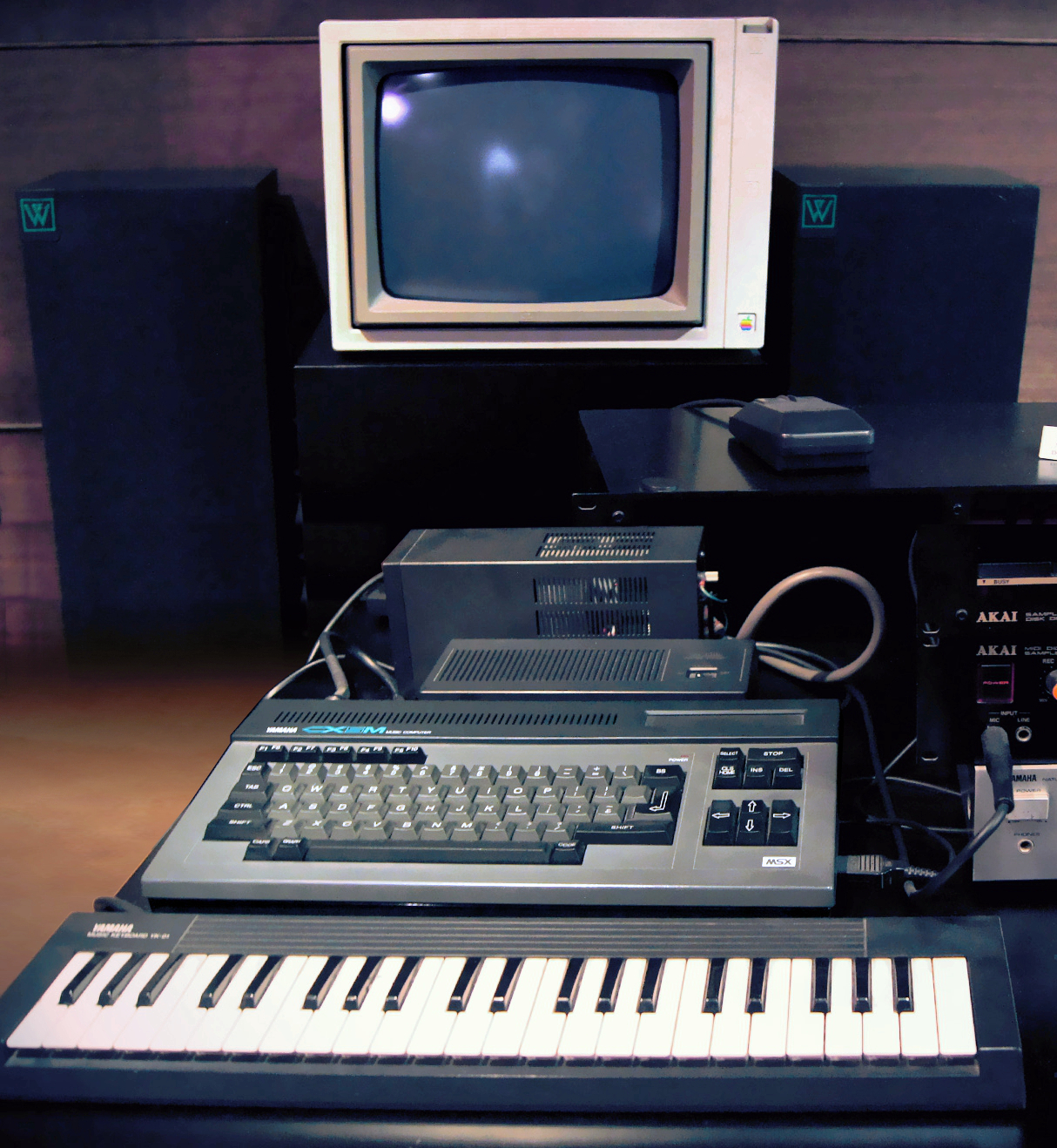
Yamaha CX5M Music Computer set

Yamaha CX5M is an MSX-system compatible computer introduced in 1984 by Yamaha Corporation that expands upon the normal features expected from these systems with a built-in eight-voice FM synthesizer module. It was notable for being one of the only MSX machines that were sold in the U.S. (alongside Spectravideo's MSX), and was billed as a digital music tool that could interface with MIDI equipment.

The CX5M was built for the MSX standard, which included slots for inserting programmed cartridges. These cartridges extended the machine's capability, accepting a range of games, office applications and so on.

== Specifications ==
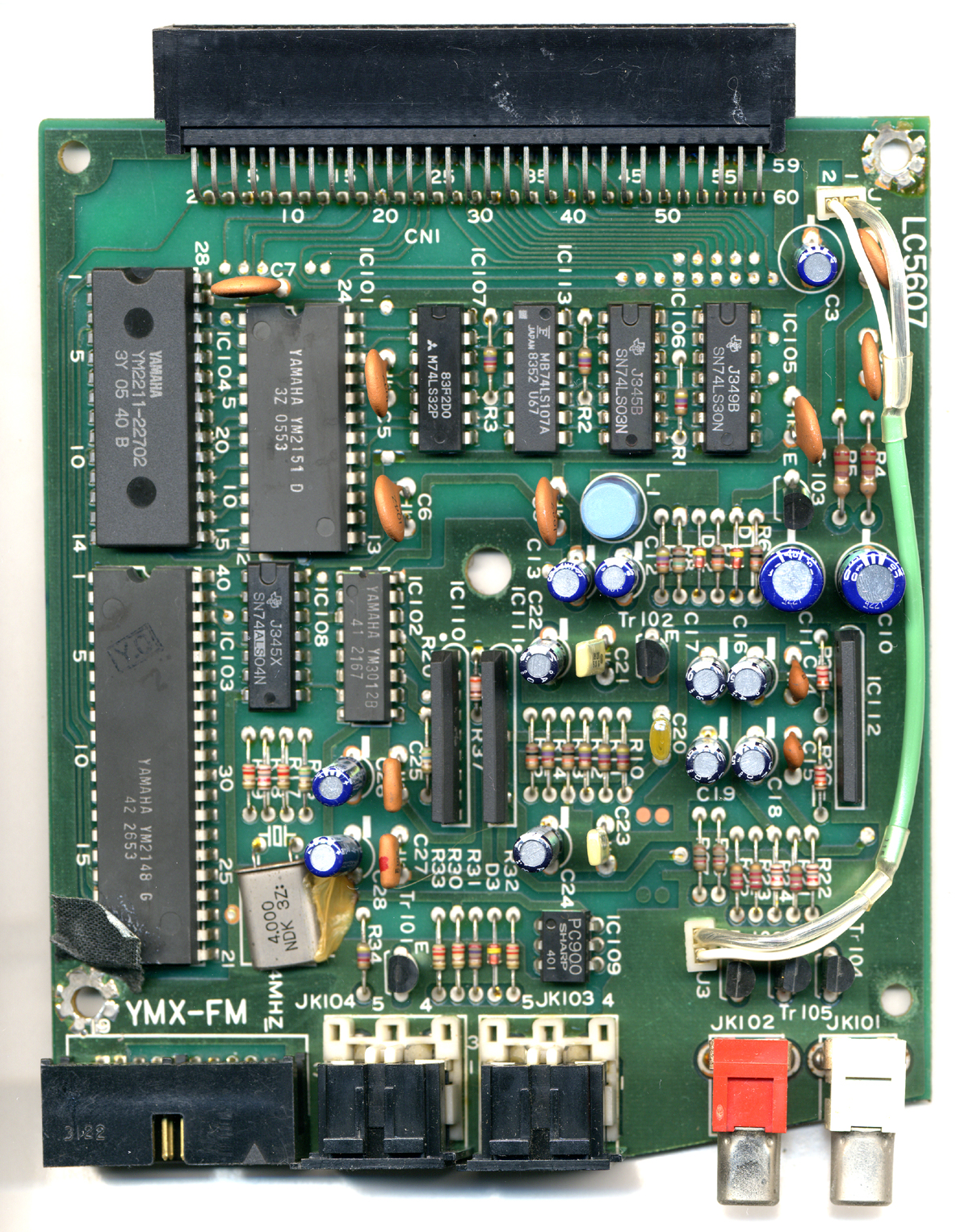
The internals of the Yamaha SFG-01 FM Synthesizer Unit: The 8-ch 4-op FM sound chip, the YM2151, was used for multitimbral sounds and composite sinusoidal modeling (CSM) singing voice.

The CX5M features an 8-bit Zilog Z80 processor clocked at 3.58 MHz. Its FM synthesizer module features the 8-ch 4-op YM2151 FM sound chip for sound generation (SFG-01 units), which was changed to the YM2164 (a variant of the YM2151 with slightly changed control registers) on later CX5M units (especially for the SFG-05 units).

Yamaha produced a range of cartridges for the system including a programmer for Yamaha's DX range of FM keyboards and a real-time sequencer. Two of these, the Voice Editor and Music Composer, allowed the user to program a bank of 48 sounds for the CX5M's own built-in synthesizer and to sequence up to eight channels of music, controlling the built-in module or external instruments via MIDI, in step-time using a musical-stave input screen.

Three versions of the CX5M were released. The first contained the FM module SFG-01, which could not receive external MIDI note information; it required a proprietary keyboard and only used its MIDI port as an output to send data to Yamaha's then-flagship DX7. The second version, the CX5M II (or CX7M/128 in Japan), upgraded the FM system to the SFG-05, which supported MIDI input and thus allowed the internal FM synth to be played by any external MIDI keyboard. The SFG-05 also featured a new FM sound chip with differences in control registers, but otherwise remains identical to the original chip. A later CX5M II with some smaller differences was also released.

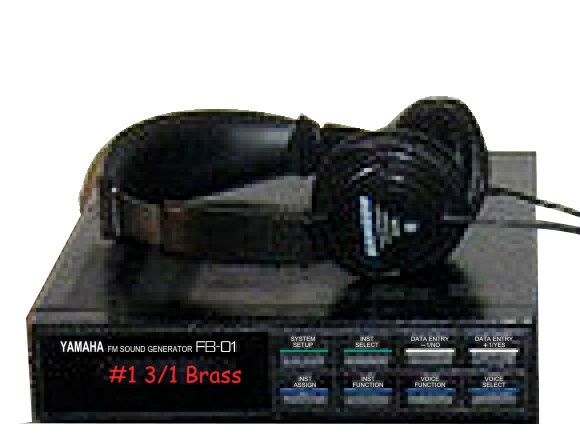
Yamaha FB-01 FM Sound Generator (with a pair of headphones sitting on top)

Yamaha released the Yamaha FB-01 MIDI module in 1986, which was essentially an SFG-05 contained in a standalone, portable case. (Note: The FB-01 is an independent Z80-based system that sends and receives data from the YM2164.)
