= Yamaha Reface =

Retro-styled synthesi,er

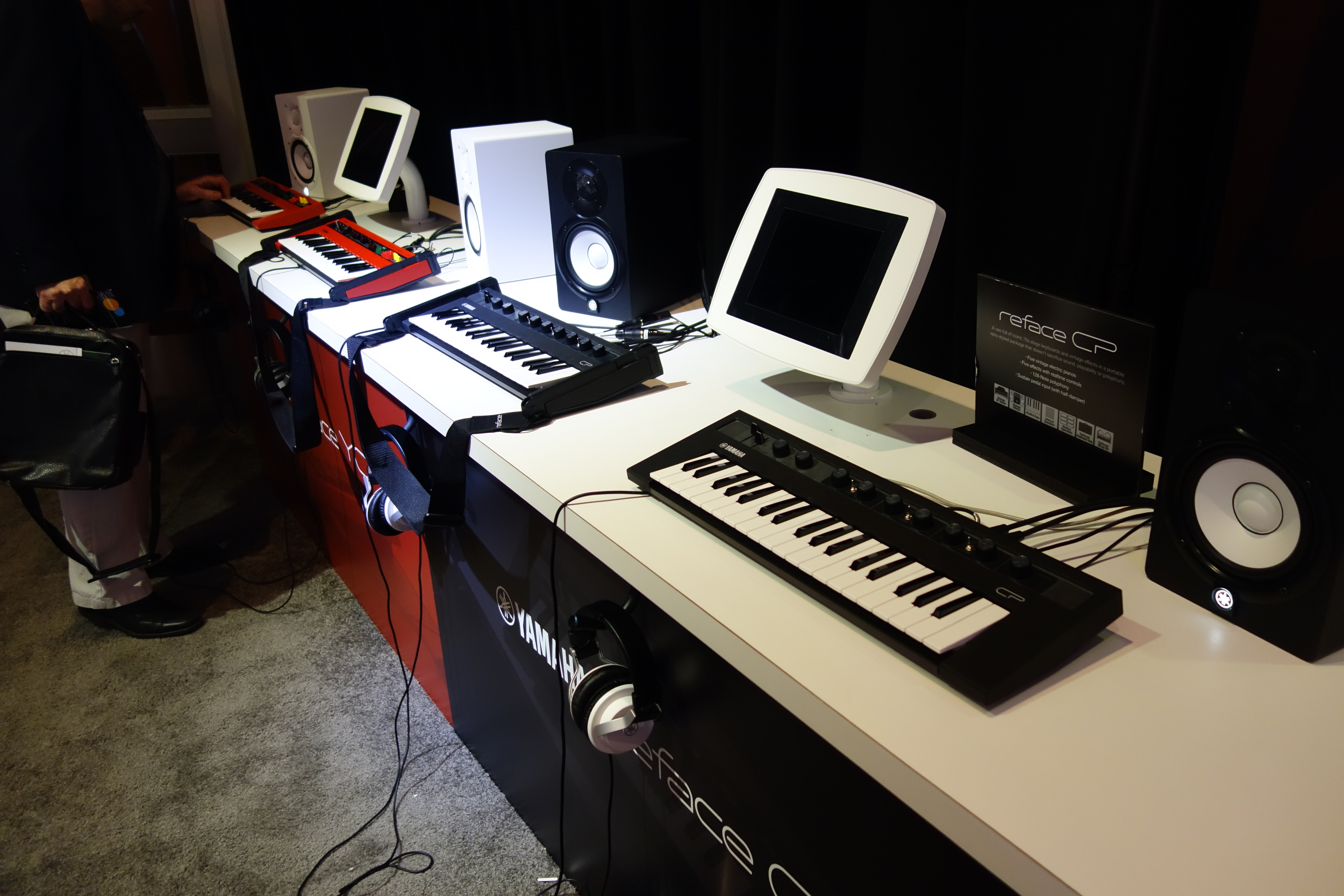
The Reface series at the 2016 NAMM Show

Yamaha Reface is a series of four retro style synthesizers manufactured by the Yamaha Corporation. Released in the summer of 2015, the series serve as a tribute to Yamaha's notable past synthesizer and keyboard products.

== Release ==
The Reface series was announced on 7 July 2015 through an online event. The day before, the announcement was mistakenly leaked by Yamaha through a Korean website. The Refaces were later showcased at Studio 2 of London's Abbey Road Studios for a press release.

== Design ==
Each keyboard measures 530 millimetres (21 in) x 175 millimetres (6.9 in) x 60 millimetres (2.4 in) and weighs 1.9 kilograms (4.2 lb). The Reface series uses Yamaha's velocity sensitive "High Quality Mini Keys", the same keys as those of Yamaha's Motif XF. Each keyboard has three octaves (37 keys) and can interface with MIDI. The Refaces have two watt speakers (in stereo), audio inputs and audio outputs. After their announcement, the Refaces drew comparisons to both the Roland Aira series and Korg's Volcas due to their affordability and inspiration taken from their respective companies' previously released synthesisers. In 2016 Yamaha released both a web app (Soundmodo) and a mobile app to facilitate sharing and saving of preset sounds on the Refaces.

== Models ==
- Reface CP - an emulation of vintage electric pianos. The CP has six sound models taken from Yamaha's CP4 stage piano: a Rhodes Mk.1, a Rhodes Mk.2, a Wurlitzer, a Clavinet, a Yamaha CP-70, and a toy piano. A bonus feature is a Piano setting accessible by putting selector between Wurl and Clav, then power on. The keyboard has a maximum polyphony of 128 notes. The Reface CP also has an effects engine that includes drive, phaser, tremolo, delay, reverb and chorus effects.

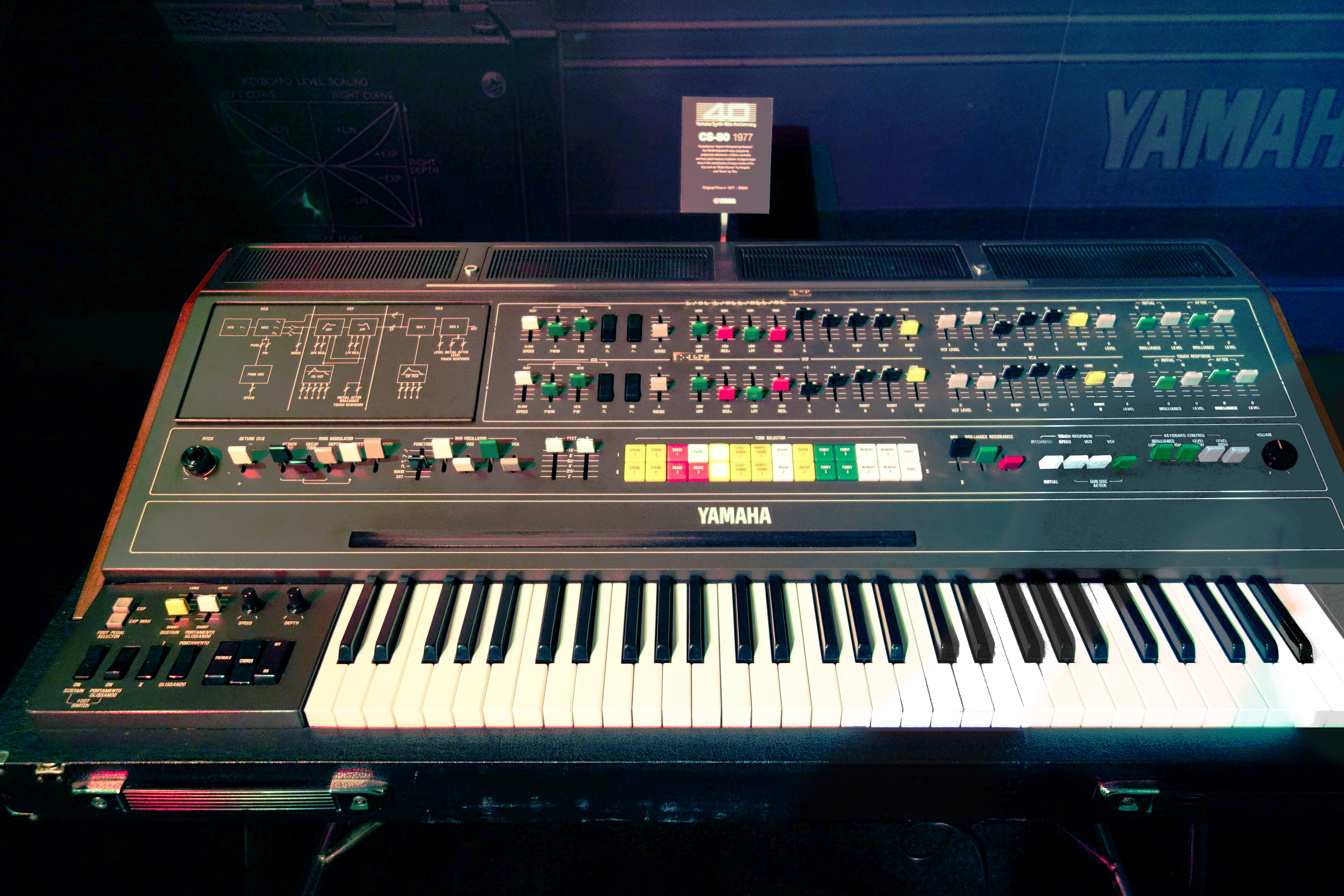
The CS-80: an inspiration to the Reface CS

- Reface CS - a virtual analogue synthesiser inspired by Yamaha's CS-80 synthesiser. It is capable of standard subtractive synthesis as well as frequency modulation (FM), ring modulation and oscillator sync. The CS has a maximum polyphony of eight notes and also includes an effects section consisting of delay, phaser, chorus and distortion.
- Reface DX - a four operator FM synthesiser with 12 FM algorithms. The synthesiser takes inspiration from Yamaha's DX series of synthesisers, which included the DX7 and DX100, among others. It uses a maximum polyphony of eight notes. The DX has a looper section (running at 120 beats per minute with a maximum length of 10 minutes) and contains two effects blocks. Each can contain a selection of effects including wah-wah, flanger, phaser, chorus, delay, reverb, and distortion. The DX has 32 slots of patch memory (4 banks of 8).
- Reface YC - a combo organ. The YC has five organ models: a Hammond B-3, a Yamaha YC-45D, an Ace Tone organ, a Vox organ and a Farfisa organ. The YC has nine drawbars to control the organs sound and has a maximum polyphony of 128. An effects block is also present on the YC; it includes a distortion, reverb and a Leslie rotary speaker emulation. (Note: Yamaha refers to the sounds on the Reface YC only as H, V, F, A, and Y and only confirm Y as their Yamaha YC45D)

== Reface robot ==
At the 2017 Superbooth music technology show, Yamaha showcased a robotic controller for the Reface CS called the Reface Robot. The robot was built in collaboration with the Fukuoka-based design company Anno Labs. The Reface Robot is made up of two aluminium sections, with robotic arms controlling the individual sliders and pots of the CS. The odd appearance of the Reface Robot was highlighted by Mixmag, who stated that "it looks like an army of robot toothbrushes cleaning a synth".

== Awards ==
- 2015 Wired Gear of the Year award.
- 2015 MusicTech Gear of the Year award.

== See also ==
- Yamaha Reface CS
