= Yamaha Reface CS =

Synthesizer introduced in 2015

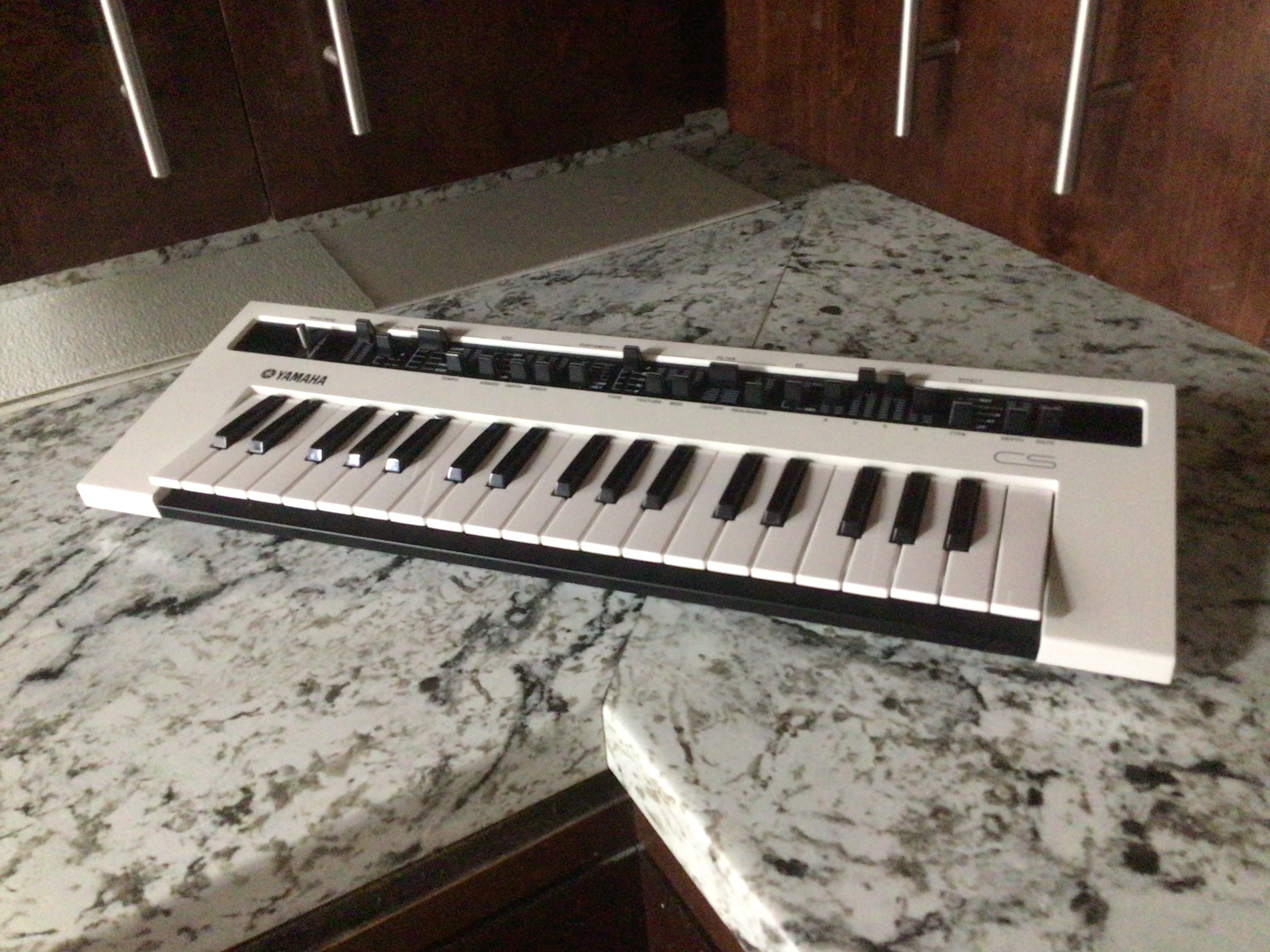
- Manufacturer: Yamaha
- Price: MSRP: 649.00 US

Technical specifications
- Polyphony: 8 notes
- Timbrality: Monotimbral
- Oscillator: 5 models; Multi-saw, Pulse, Sync, Ring-mod, FM
- LFO: Triangle, assignable to Amp, Filter, Pitch or Oscillator Mod
- Synthesis type: Digital Subtractive
- Filter: Low-pass, 18 dB/octave, self-oscillating
- Attenuator: Shares envelope with filter via blend control
- Aftertouch expression: No
- Velocity expression: No (Only for MIDI out)
- Storage memory: No
- Effects: Delay, Flange/Chorus, Phase, Distortion

Input/output
- Keyboard: 37 keys
- Left-hand control: Pitch-bend lever, octave select

The Yamaha Reface CS is a virtual analog synthesizer released in September 2015 as part of the Reface-series of compact keyboards inspired by earlier Yamaha synthesizers. Inspired by the CS-80 synthesizer, it is viewed as a modern and portable version on the classic synthesizer by critics. It is capable of standard subtractive synthesis as well as frequency and ring modulation.

== See also ==
- List of Yamaha products
