= IBM Music Feature Card =

1987 computer sound card

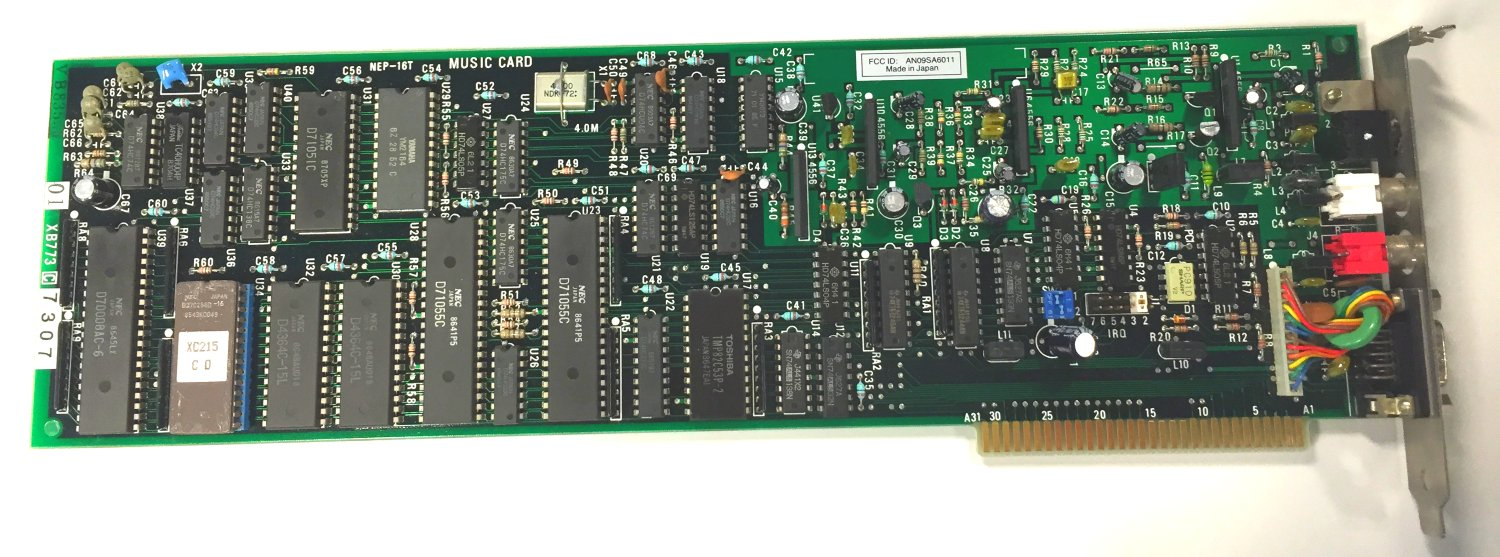
- Manufacturer: IBM
- Introduced: 1987; 39 years ago
- Type: Professional sound cards

The IBM Music Feature Card (simply referred to as the IBM PC 'Music Feature' by IBM) and sometimes abbreviated as the IBM MFC, or just IMFC) is a professional-level sound card for the PC, and used the 8-bit ISA bus. The card made use of the Yamaha YM2164 chip which produces sound and music via FM synthesis.

It was introduced in 1987 by IBM, and originally oriented towards composers and musicians.

In the late 80's, sound was becoming the norm in computer games and as such, video game companies started supporting sound cards in their products. In the case of the IBM Music Feature Card, Sierra and MicroProse were the main companies who showed support.

The IBM Music Feature Card failed to gain much traction, mainly because of its high retail price US$495 (equivalent to $1,400 in 2025), and aggressive, superior competition by Roland with the internal LAPC-I (and MT-32 external sound module equivalent).

Some games fully support the IMFC, including King's Quest IV: The Perils of Rosella, Leisure Suit Larry Goes Looking for Love (in Several Wrong Places), Leisure Suit Larry III: Passionate Patti in Pursuit of the Pulsating Pectorals, Space Quest III: The Pirates of Pestulon and Silpheed.

== See also ==
- IBM PC
- Sound card
- Sierra Online
- Roland LAPC-I, MPU-401 and MT-32
