= Yamaha DX27 =

Synthesizer

DX27
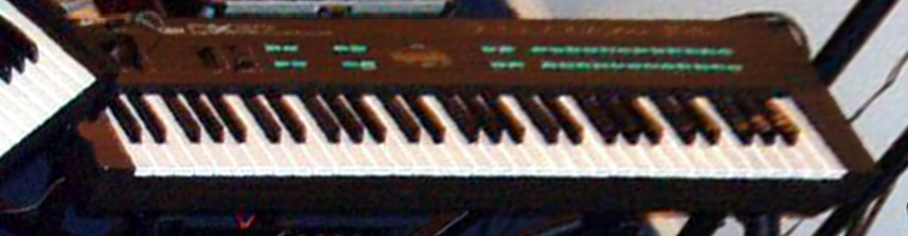
- Manufacturer: Yamaha
- Dates: 1985
- Price: Y102,900 $645US

Technical specifications
- Polyphony: 8 voices
- Timbrality: 1 part
- Oscillator: 4-Operator Digital FM synthesizer
- LFO: Saw up, square, triangle, random
- Synthesis type: FM Synthesis
- Filter: No
- Aftertouch expression: No
- Velocity expression: No
- Storage memory: 192 preset, 24 user
- Effects: Stereo Chorus (DX27S only)

Input/output
- Keyboard: 61 note
- Left-hand control: Modulation, pitch bend
- External control: MIDI (In, Out, Thru)

The Yamaha DX27 is a full sized key version of the Yamaha DX100. It was released in 1985 and manufactured in Japan. The DX27S is the same synth, with built in speakers, stereo output, chorus fx and internal power supply.

== Keyboard ==
The DX27 features 61 unweighted full sized keys without velocity or aftertouch. (Synth engine can receive and process velocity data via MIDI IN).

== Memory ==
The unit features 192 presets, 24 user presets.

== Sounds ==
The DX27 is most notable for its "solid bass" sound (Patch PB 01). This sound was also shared by other 4-op FM synths, such as the FB-01, DX21, and DX100.

== See also ==
- Yamaha DX7
