= Korg DS-8 =

Synthesizer

DS-8
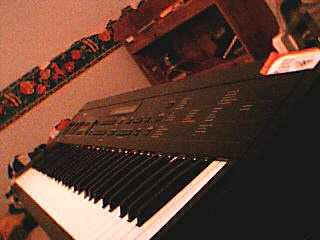
- Manufacturer: KORG
- Dates: 1987
- Price: $ 1400

Technical specifications
- Polyphony: 8
- Oscillator: 2
- LFO: Triangle, Square, Sawtooth, Sine
- Synthesis type: FM Synthesizer (4 operators)
- Filter: 1 per voice
- Attenuator: ADSR Envelope
- Aftertouch expression: Yes (monophonic)
- Velocity expression: Yes
- Storage memory: 100 Programs and 10 Combinations
- Effects: Manual Delay, Long Delay, Short Delay, Doubling, Phaser, Chorus, Portamento
- Hardware: YM2164 (OPP)

Input/output
- Keyboard: 61-key
- Left-hand control: Joystick
- External control: MIDI

The Korg DS-8 is a digital eight-voice FM synthesizer released by Korg in 1987. Following an agreement with Yamaha for access to its research and development facilities, it was designed using Yamaha components and constructed under a licensing agreement. It introduced an analog-style interface for controlling FM sounds and could play different patches on each of its eight voices, marking it as Korg's first multi-timbral MIDI synthesizer. Accompanying its launch was the Korg 707, a more portable version of the DS-8, lacking digital effects but equipped with strap pegs for keytar performance.

== Sounds and features ==
The DS-8 is an eight-voice FM synthesizer that supports multitimbrality and features a five-octave keyboard with velocity sensitivity and aftertouch. It has a user-friendly interface that resembles that of analog synthesizers, avoiding FM programming terms such as algorithms and operators. It is equipped with two oscillators, each having its own four-stage timbre and amplitude envelopes. Additionally, there is a shared four-stage pitch envelope and an LFO for both oscillators. The first oscillator includes sawtooth, square, bright sawtooth, and bright square waveforms. The second oscillator provides sawtooth and square waveforms with the added feature of cross-modulation selection.

The timbre EG section features a master level control for the timbre, an envelope for timbre shaping, and an intensity parameter that adjusts the timbre EG's modulation effect within the set master level. Additionally, it includes a keyboard-tracking function that shortens the envelope at higher keys and lengthens it at lower keys. The amplitude EG section offers a master level to balance the two oscillators' volumes, envelope rate adjustments, and keyboard tracking. Additional controls include a spectrum parameter for resonance effects and ring-modulation.

The DS-8 includes performance controls for easy sound editing, with switches for toggling velocity, aftertouch, portamento, and effects. Additional controls adjust the timbre and volume envelopes of oscillators, relative to preset values, allowing for easy sound modifications. The joystick has four directional movements: moving it left or right adjusts the pitch bend, which can vary between 0-12 semitones. Pushing it up activates pitch modulation (vibrato), and pulling it down adjusts both amplitude modulation (tremolo) and timbre modulation (wah-wah). Diagonal movements merge pitch bending with these modulations for combined effects.

A backlit LCD screen shows multiple parameters and navigation buttons to adjust the settings, including a slider for value changes. It can store up to 500 sounds and 50 combi-programs, using onboard memory and a credit-card-sized RAM. You can select between polyphonic and unison modes for playing, with unison combining all eight voices for a stronger sound, including options for voice detuning and trigger modes. Portamento is customizable for each patch and activated from the front panel.

Similar to the digital delay found in the Korg DW-8000 and Poly-800 MkII, the DS-8 includes this feature and allows multiple options such as long delay, short delay, doubling, flanger, chorus, and manual, accessed by the front panel. The long delay ranges from 105-729ms and the short delay ranges from 20-88ms. Each patch can have a designated effect, but the DS-8 can only produce one effect at a time.
