= Yamaha DX100 (synthesizer) =

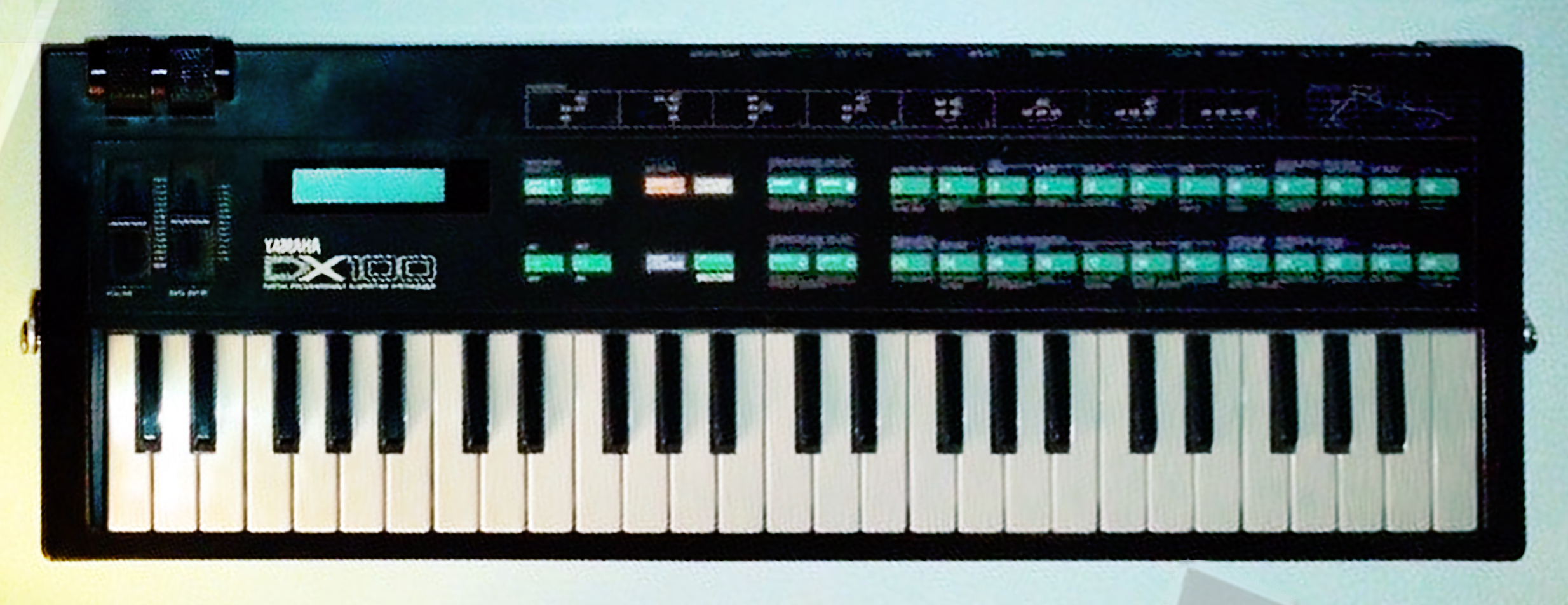
- Manufacturer: Yamaha
- Dates: 1985
- Price: £349 GBP $445 US

Technical specifications
- Polyphony: 8 note
- Timbrality: 1 part
- Oscillator: 4 sine wave, (4 operators, 8 algorithms)
- LFO: 1 (Sample & Hold, Saw Up, Sine, Square, Triangle, Delay, Key Sync)
- Synthesis type: Digital FM
- Filter: None
- Aftertouch expression: Yes
- Storage memory: 192 ROM patches, 32 RAM patches.
- Hardware: HD63803XP (CPU), YM3014 (DAC), YM2164 (FM synthesis chip)

Input/output
- Keyboard: 49 mini key
- Left-hand control: 2 wheels for pitch & modulation
- External control: Breath controller, MIDI In, out, thru, footswitch,

The Yamaha DX100 is an FM synthesizer released by Yamaha in 1986. It offers four operators for each of its eight voices, & has eight algorithms (compared to the DX7's six operators for each of its sixteen voices, & thirty-two algorithms). It has 49 mini-keys, & no arpeggiator or effects, & known in particular for its bass patch #1. It features up to 192 presets, seriously improving the DX7's limited preset capabilities. It can also store 24 user-programmable sounds in RAM. It lacks cartridge support, but voice patches can be saved to & loaded from an external cassette recorder.

It was the cheapest user-programmable FM synthesiser made in the 1980s, leading to its popularity even amongst professional musicians in the 80s & 90s. It's essentially a cut down version of the DX21 & DX27, using the same FM chip, the YM2164.

The control panel design on the left arm of Crypton Future Media's Vocaloid Hatsune Miku is directly modeled by KEI after the layout of the Yamaha DX100 synthesizer, chosen for its compact, wearable design compared to the larger DX7 model.

== See also ==
- Yamaha DX1
- Yamaha DX5
- Yamaha DX7
- Yamaha DX9
- Yamaha DX11
- Yamaha DX21
- Yamaha DX27 / 27S
