= Yamaha DX21 =

1985 digital FM synthesizer

DX21
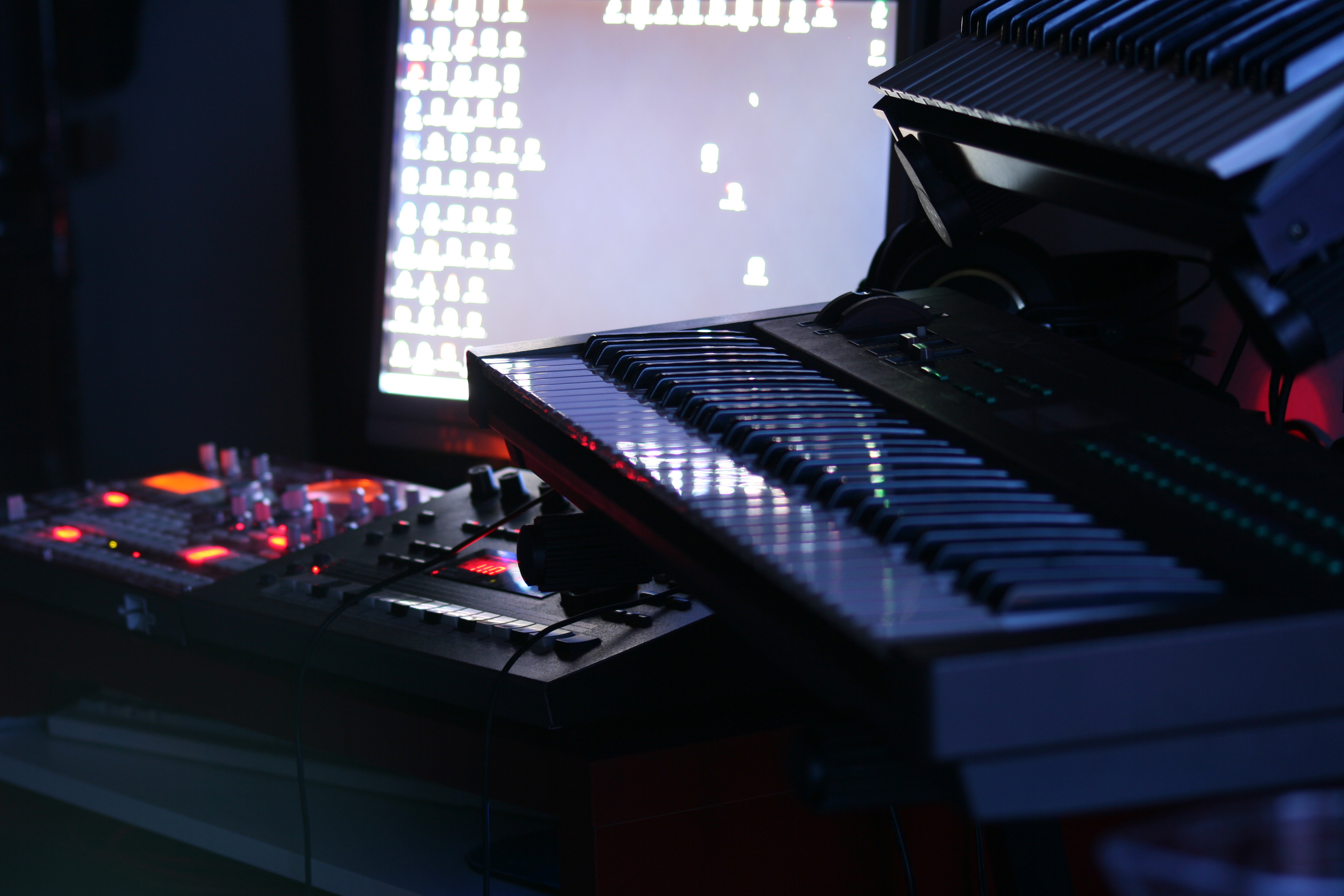
- A Yamaha DX21 synthesizer shown along with various 90s and 2000s-era groove machines.
- Manufacturer: Yamaha
- Dates: 1985

Technical specifications
- Polyphony: 8-voice
- Timbrality: Bi-timbral
- Oscillator: 4-Operator, 8 algorithms
- Synthesis type: Frequency modulation synthesis (FM)
- Filter: None
- Aftertouch expression: Yes, via MIDI only
- Velocity expression: Yes, via MIDI only
- Storage memory: 128 patches, 16 performances
- Effects: Chorus

Input/output
- Keyboard: 61 key
- Left-hand control: Modulation, pitch bend
- External control: MIDI (In, Out, Thru)

The Yamaha DX21 is a digital controlled bi-timbral programmable digital FM synthesizer with a four operator synth voice generator which was released in 1985 by Yamaha. It uses sine wave-based frequency modulation (FM) synthesis. It has four FM tone generators and a 32-voice random-access memory (RAM), 32 user voices and 128 read-only memory (ROM) factory preset sounds. As a programmable synth, it enables users to create their own unique synthesized tones and sound effects by using the algorithms and oscillators. The instrument weighs 8 kg (17.6 lbs). On its release, it sold for $795.

== Keyboard ==
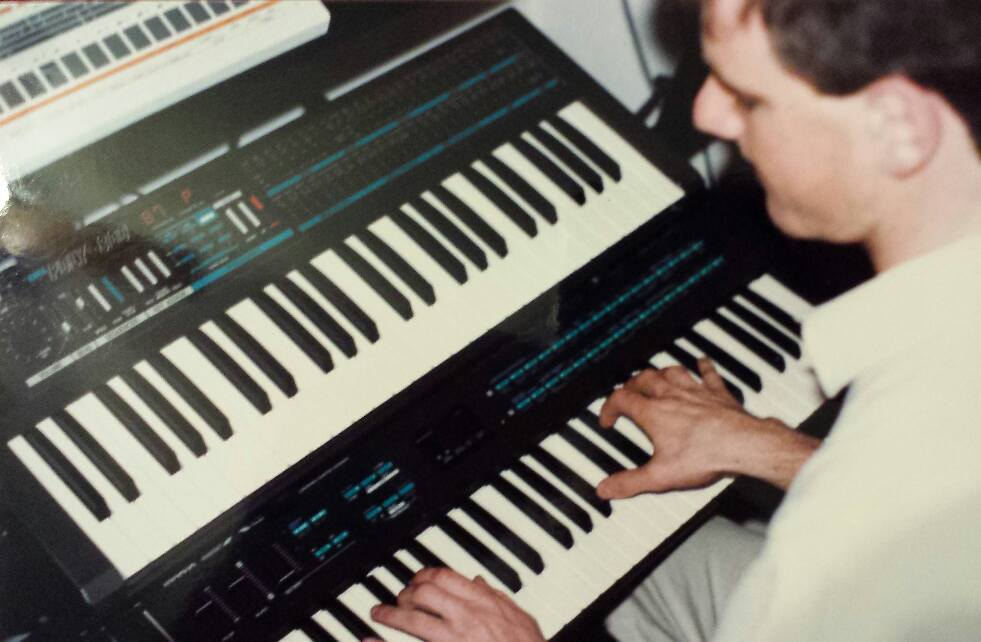
A DX21 synthesizer being played alongside a Korg Poly-800 and Roland TR-707

The keyboard has 61 keys which are not velocity-sensitive to harder or softer key presses. It can produce eight note polyphony, which means up to eight keys can be pressed at once. In split keyboard mode, the polyphony limit is still eight notes, but there is a maximum of four for the lower half and four for the upper half. In mono mode, the DX21 can play only one note, unless the keyboard is split; if the keyboard is split, the DX21 can do one mono voice for the lower split and one mono voice for the upper split.

== MIDI and jacks ==
The DX21 is MIDI compatible, which enables performers to use the DX21 to control other digital instruments (e.g., a drum machine or other synth), or use other MIDI-compatible controllers or devices to play the DX21's synthesized sounds. The DX21 has 1/4" jacks for plugging in a sustain pedal, a portamento pedal, and a volume expression pedal and an input for a BC-1 breath controller. The breath controller, an external accessory, works with certain synthesizer patches to control the sound. The DX21 has MIDI in, out and thru 5 pin DIN jacks, which enable the instrument to be connected to a computer, drum machine, sequencer, or other MIDI-compatible device. The CPU is a Hitachi HD63B03XP, a derivative of the Motorola 6803, and the sound generation chip is the YM2164 (OPP), a variant of the YM2151 (OPM). The DAC is a YM3012.

The instrument has an un-backlit LCD panel which indicates the name of the voice or sound and provides information on the status of the instrument. A split point can be set on the keyboard, to enable part of the keyboard to be used with one sound and part for another sound. For example, a bass sound could be put on the left side of the keyboard, and a flute sound on the other half. The DX21 also has a modulation wheel and a pitch bend wheel. The two tone generators are output via two output jacks, allowing for separate processing and output by a stereo keyboard amplifier, PA system, or other audio gear; although a mixture of the generators can be output on one jack too.

== Sounds and effects ==
The 128 ROM preset synthesized sounds or "voices" are grouped into 16 categories: piano sounds; electric piano sounds; pipe organ sounds; string sounds (violin, cello, etc.); brass instruments; plucked strings; comping (accompanying instruments); percussion 1; percussion 2; lead synth; other keyboards; wind reeds; bass; and three sound effect categories, which include sounds such as "racing car", "helicopter", "whistling", and basic sounds such as "LFO noise". Users can save their own newly-created synth tones to an external cassette recorder. It has an onboard chorus effect. The low frequency oscillator (LFO) has modulators for amplitude and pitch, using saw, square, triangle wave shapes. There are four envelopes.

== DX100 ==
The DX100 was also released in 1985. It uses similar electronics to provide a keyboard with 49 minikeys that is smaller and easier to carry. The DX100 is a 4-operator FM synthesizer that is monotimbral. It has no filters or effects. It has 192 preset voices and 24 user-programmable voices. It has MIDI capabilities and MIDI in/out and thru jacks. It has a single mono output, a single footswitch jack for a sustain pedal or portamento pedal and a BC1 breath controller jack.

== Comparison with DX7 ==
The DX21 has 4 operators and 8 algorithms, while the DX7 has 6 operators and 32 algorithms. The DX7 is a 16 voice polyphonic synth, while the DX21 is an 8 voice polyphonic synth. The DX21 also includes a simple chorus effect that can be toggled on or off, which the DX7 lacked.

== See also ==
- Yamaha DX7
