= Digital synthesizer =

Synthesizer that uses digital signal processing to make sounds

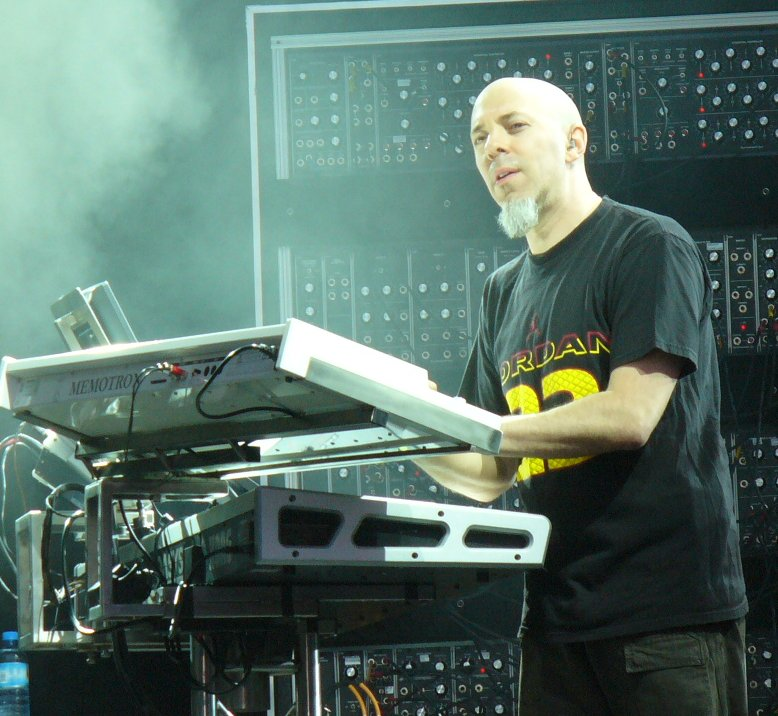
Jordan Rudess performing with a digital synth

A digital synthesizer is a synthesizer that uses digital signal processing (DSP) techniques to make musical sounds, in contrast to older analog synthesizers, which produce music using analog electronics, and samplers, which play back digital recordings of acoustic, electric, or electronic instruments. Some digital synthesizers emulate analog synthesizers, while others include sampling capability in addition to digital synthesis.

== History ==
The very earliest digital synthesis experiments were made with computers, as part of academic research into sound generation.

In 1957, the first programming language for computer music, MUSIC, was developed by Max Mathews on an IBM 704 at Bell Labs in 1957. It generates digital audio waveforms through direct synthesis.

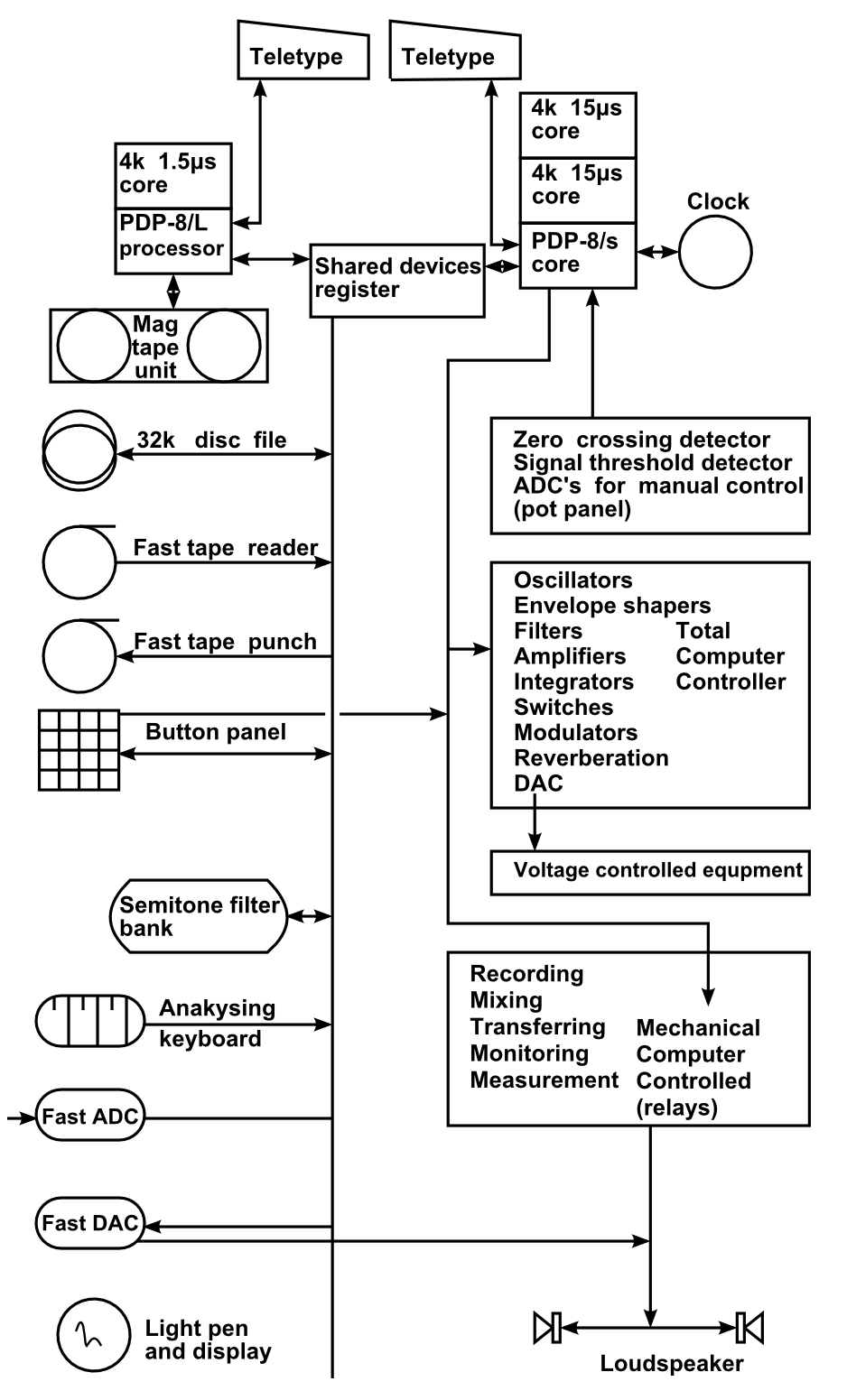
EMS MUSYS-3 (1970) (based on Nunzio 2014)

c. 1969, EMS MUSYS 3 system was developed by Peter Grogono (software), David Cockerell (hardware and interfacing) and Peter Zinovieff (system design and operation) at their London (Putney) Studio. The system ran on two mini-computers, Digital Equipment PDP-8's. These had a pair of fast D/A and A/D converters, 12,000 (12k) bytes of core memory (RAM), backed up by a hard drive of 32k and by tape storage (DecTape). The earliest digital sampling was done on that system during 1971–1972 for Harrison Birtwistle's "Chronometer" released in 1975.

In 1972–1974, Dartmouth Digital Synthesizer was developed by Dartmouth College Professors Jon Appleton and Frederick J. Hooven, in association with NED co-founders Sydney A. Alonso and Cameron W. Jones.

In 1977, Bell Labs Digital Synthesizer was developed by Hal Ales at Bell Labs.

In 1977, New England Digital (NED) released the Synclavier, the first commercial synthesizer to use purely digital sound generation and also the world's first commercial FM synthesizer.

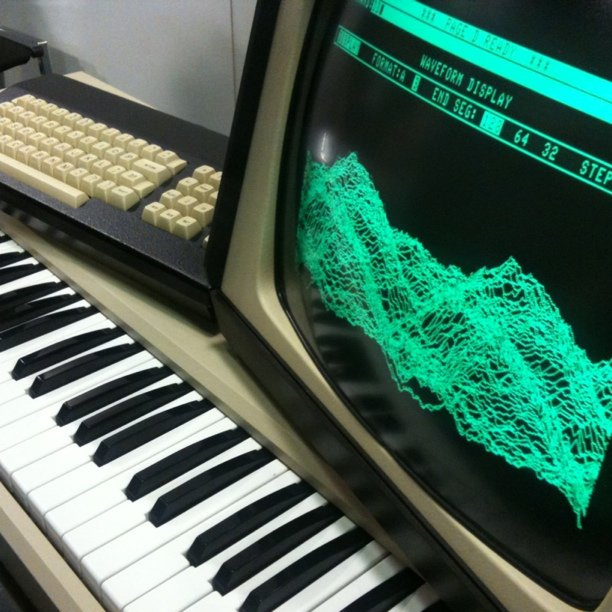
Fairlight CMI series II (1982), exhibited at NAMM Show

Early commercial digital synthesizers used simple hard-wired digital circuitry to implement techniques such as additive synthesis and FM synthesis. Other techniques, such as wavetable synthesis and physical modeling, only became possible with the advent of high-speed microprocessor and digital signal processing technology. Two other early commercial digital synthesizers were the Fairlight CMI, introduced in 1979, and the New England Digital Synclavier II, introduced in 1979 as an upgrade to the original Synclavier. The Fairlight CMI was one of the earlier sampling synthesizers, while the Synclavier originally used FM synthesis technology licensed from Yamaha, before adding the world's first 16-bit, real-time hard drive streaming sampler later in 1982. The Fairlight CMI and the Synclavier were both expensive systems, retailing for more than $20,000 in the early 1980s. The cost of digital synthesizers began falling rapidly in the early 1980s. E-mu Systems introduced the Emulator sampling synthesizer in 1982 at a retail price of $7,900. Although not as flexible or powerful as either the Fairlight CMI or the Synclavier, its lower cost and portability made it popular.

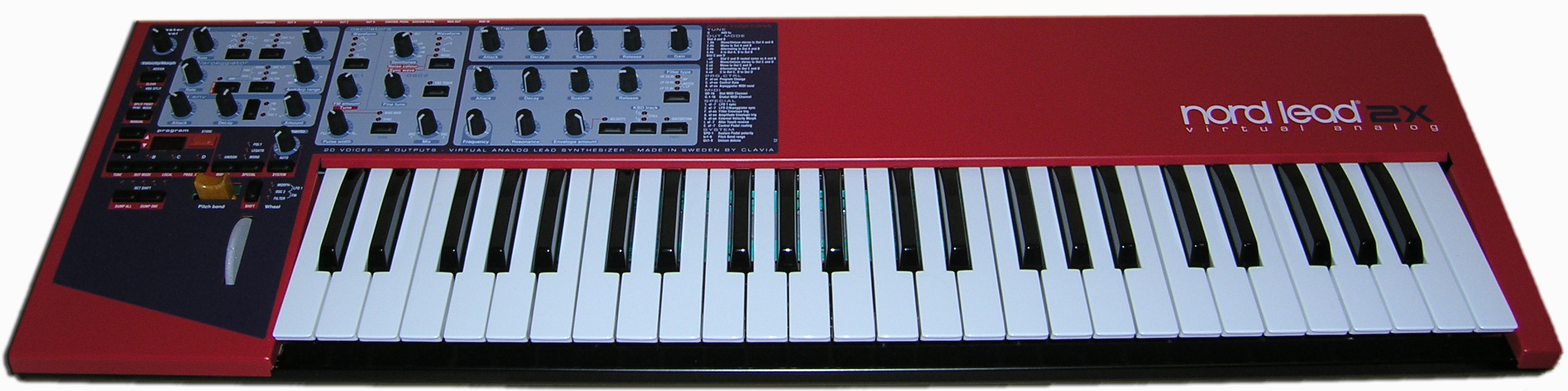
The Clavia Nord Lead is a popular virtual analog synth

With the addition of sophisticated sequencers on board, now added to built-in effects and other features, the 'workstation' synthesizer had been born. These always include a multi-track sequencer, and can often record and play back samples, and in later years full audio tracks, to be used to record an entire song. These are usually also ROMplers, playing back samples, to give a wide variety of realistic instrument and other sounds such as drums, string instruments and wind instruments to sequence and compose songs, along with popular keyboard instrument sounds such as electric pianos and organs.

As there was still interest in analog synthesizers, and with the increase of computing power, over the 1990s another type of synthesizer arose: the analog modeling, or "virtual analog" synthesizer. These use computing power to simulate traditional analog waveforms and circuitry such as envelopes and filters, with the most popular examples of this type of instrument including the Nord Lead and Access Virus.

Digital synthesizers can now be completely emulated in software ("softsynth"), and run on conventional PC hardware. Such soft implementations require careful programming and a fast CPU to get the same latency response as their dedicated equivalents. To reduce latency, some professional sound card manufacturers have developed specialized Digital Signal Processing ([DSP]) hardware. Dedicated digital synthesizers have the advantage of a performance-friendly user interface (physical controls like buttons for selecting features and enabling functionality, and knobs for setting variable parameters). On the other hand, software synthesizers have the advantages afforded by a rich graphical display.

With focus on performance-oriented keyboards and digital computer technology, manufacturers of commercial electronic instruments created some of the earliest digital synthesizers for studio and experimental use with computers being able to handle built-in sound synthesis algorithms.

=== In Japan ===
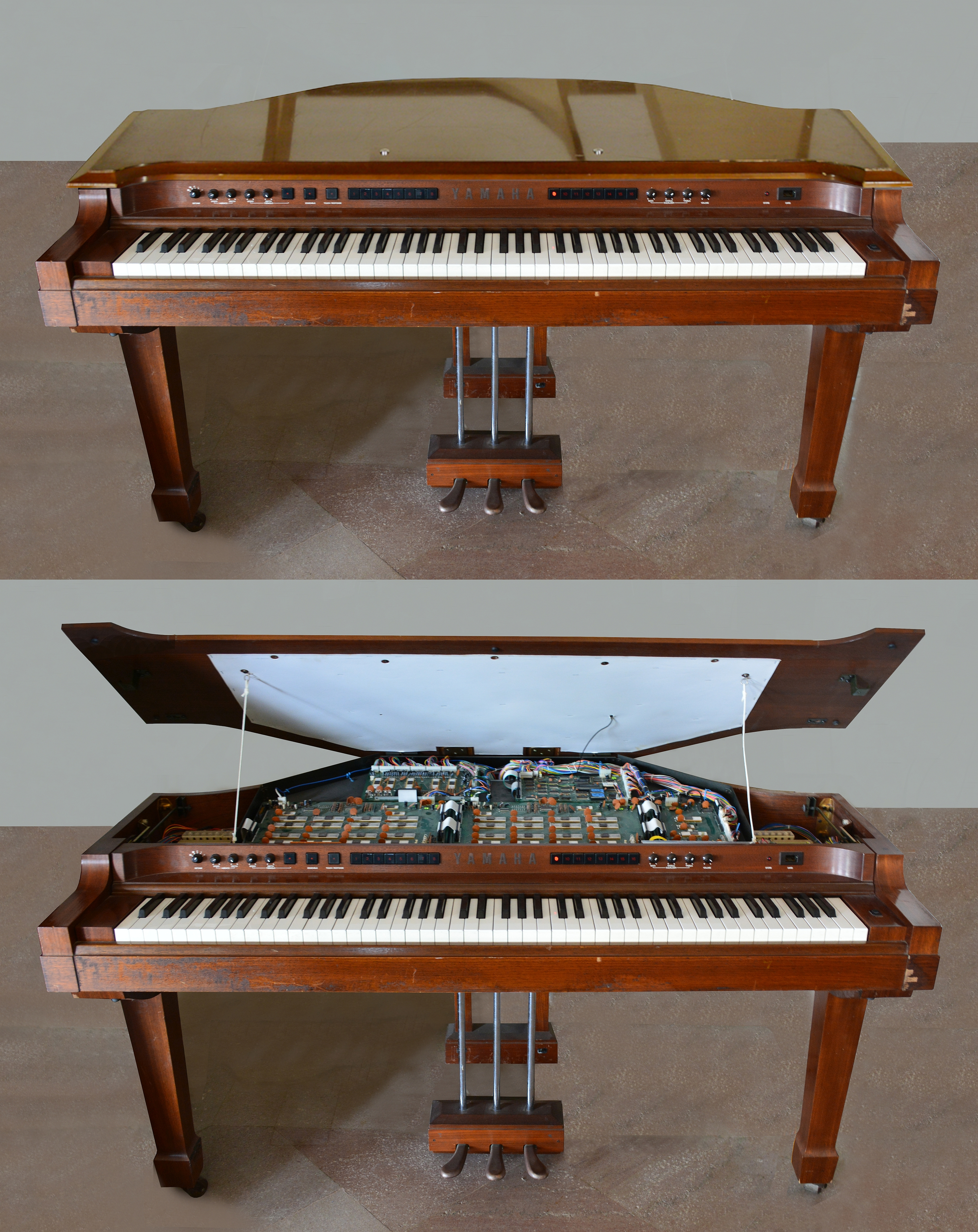
The GS-1 (1980) was the first commercial digital synthesizer by Yamaha based on FM synthesis. For $16,000, the buyer also got a desktop computer for programming it.

In 1973, the Japanese company Yamaha licensed the patent for frequency modulation synthesis (FM synthesis) from John Chowning, who had experimented with it at Stanford University since 1971. Yamaha's engineers began adapting Chowning's algorithm for use in a commercial digital synthesizer, adding improvements such as the "key scaling" method to avoid the introduction of distortion that normally occurred in analog systems during frequency modulation, though it would take several years before Yamaha were to release their FM digital synthesizers. In the 1970s, Yamaha were granted a number of patents, under the company's former name "Nippon Gakki Seizo Kabushiki Kaisha", evolving Chowning's early work on FM synthesis technology. Yamaha built the first prototype digital synthesizer in 1974.

Released in 1979, the Casio VL-1 was the first low budget digital synthesizer, selling for $69.95. Yamaha eventually commercialized their FM synthesis technology and released the company's first FM digital synthesizer in 1980, the Yamaha GS-1, but at an expensive retail price of $16,000.

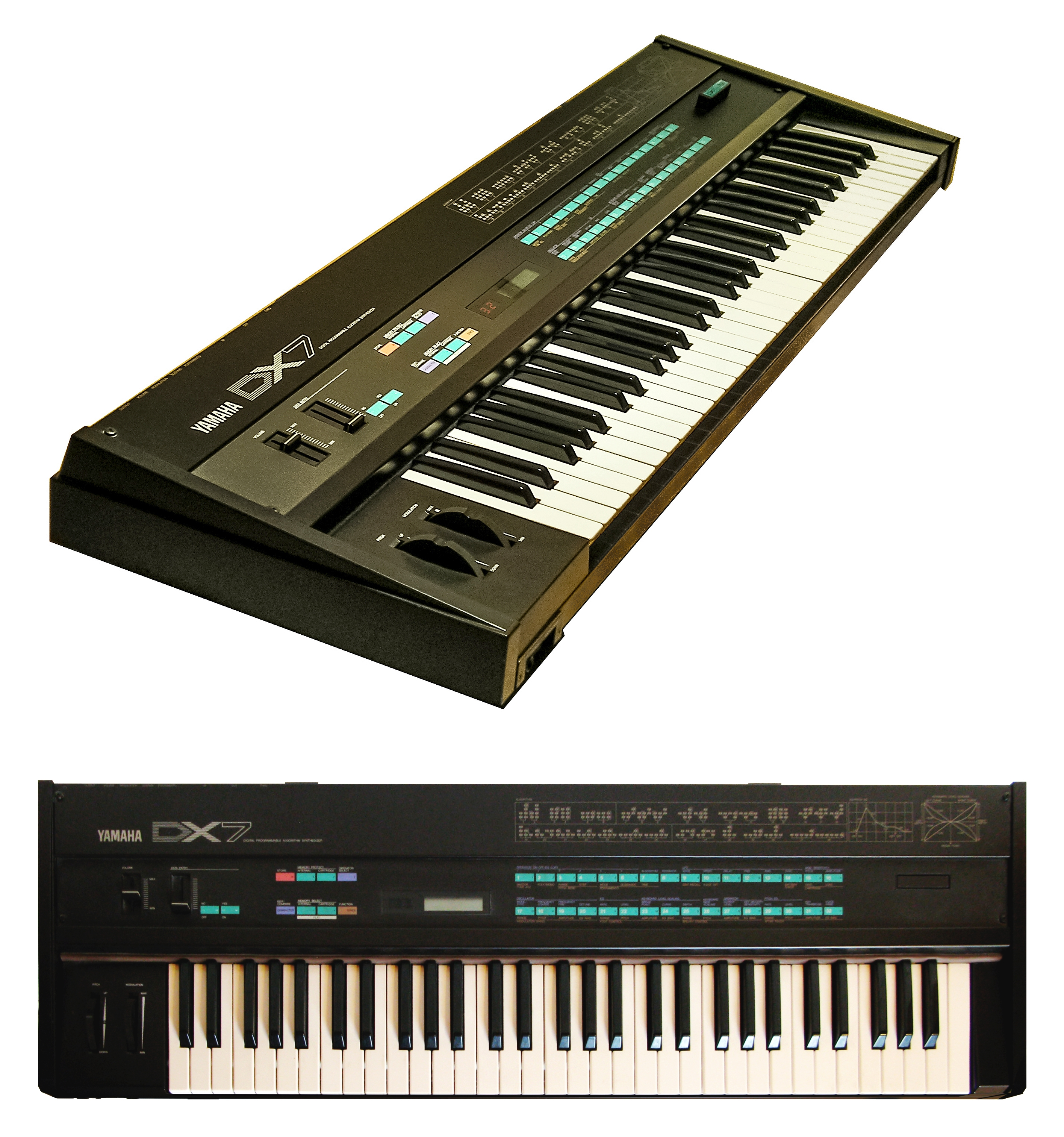
The Yamaha DX7 (1983) signalled the rise of digital synthesizers. Also due to its affordable price of around $2,000, it became a huge success with about 200,000 units sold. While being notoriously difficult to program by the user, its pre-installed sounds significantly influenced 1980s pop and rock music.

Introduced in 1983, the Yamaha DX7 was the breakthrough digital synthesizer to have a major impact, both innovative and affordable, and thus spelling the decline of analog synthesizers. It used FM synthesis and, although it was incapable of the sampling synthesis of the Fairlight CMI, its price was around $2,000, putting it within range of a much larger number of musicians. The DX-7 was also known for its "key scaling" method to avoid distortion and for its recognizably bright tonality that was partly due to its high sampling rate of 57 kHz. It became indispensable to many music artists of the 1980s, and would become one of the best-selling synthesizers of all time.

In 1987, Roland released its own influential synthesizer of the time, the D-50. This popular synth broke new ground in affordably combining short samples and digital oscillators, as well as the innovation of built-in digital effects (reverb., chorus, equalizer). Roland called this Linear Arithmetic (LA) synthesis. This instrument is responsible for some of the very recognisable preset synthesizer sounds of the late 1980s, such as the Pizzagogo sound used on Enya's "Orinoco Flow."

It gradually became feasible to include high quality samples of existing instruments as opposed to synthesizing them. In 1988, Korg introduced the last of the hugely popular trio of digital synthesizers of the 1980s after the DX7 and D50, the M1. This heralded both the increasing popularisation of digital sample-based synthesis, and the rise of 'workstation' synthesizers. After this time, many popular modern digital synthesizers have been described as not being full synthesizers in the most precise sense, as they play back samples stored in their memory. However, they still include options to shape the sounds through use of envelopes, LFOs, filters and effects such as reverb. The Yamaha Motif and Roland Fantom series of keyboards are typical examples of this type, described as 'ROMplers'; at the same time, they are also examples of "workstation" synthesizers.

As the cost of processing power and memory fell, new types of synthesizers emerged, offering a variety of novel sound synthesis options. The Korg Oasys was one such example, packaging multiple digital synthesizers into a single unit.

== Analog vs. digital ==
An analog synthesizer creates sound using electronic circuitry, such as voltage-controlled oscillators and voltage-controlled filters. In contrast, a digital synthesizer generates a stream of numbers, often using some form of digital signal processor, which are then converted to sound using a digital-to-analog converter (DAC).

A digital synthesizer is in essence a computer with (often) a piano or organ keyboard and an LCD as a user interface. Because computer technology is rapidly advancing, it is often possible to offer more features in a digital synthesizer than in an analog synthesizer at a given price. However, both technologies have their own merit. Some forms of synthesis, such as, for instance, sampling and additive synthesis are not feasible in analog synthesizers, while on the other hand, many musicians prefer the character of analog synthesizers over their digital equivalent.

== Usage ==
The new wave era of the 1980s first brought the digital synthesizer to the public ear. Bands like Talking Heads and Duran Duran used the digitally made sounds on some of their most popular albums. Other more pop-inspired bands like Hall & Oates began incorporating the digital synthesizer into their sound in the 1980s. Through breakthroughs in technology in the 1990s many modern synthesizers use DSP.

== Digital synthesis ==
Working in more or less the same way, every digital synthesizer appears similar to a computer. At a steady sample rate, digital synthesis produces a stream of numbers. Sound from speakers is then produced by a conversion to analog form. Direct digital synthesis is the typical architecture for digital synthesizers. Through signal generation, voice and instrument-level processing, a signal flow is created and controlled either by MIDI capabilities or voice and instrument-level controls.
