= Yamaha DX7 =

Synthesizer

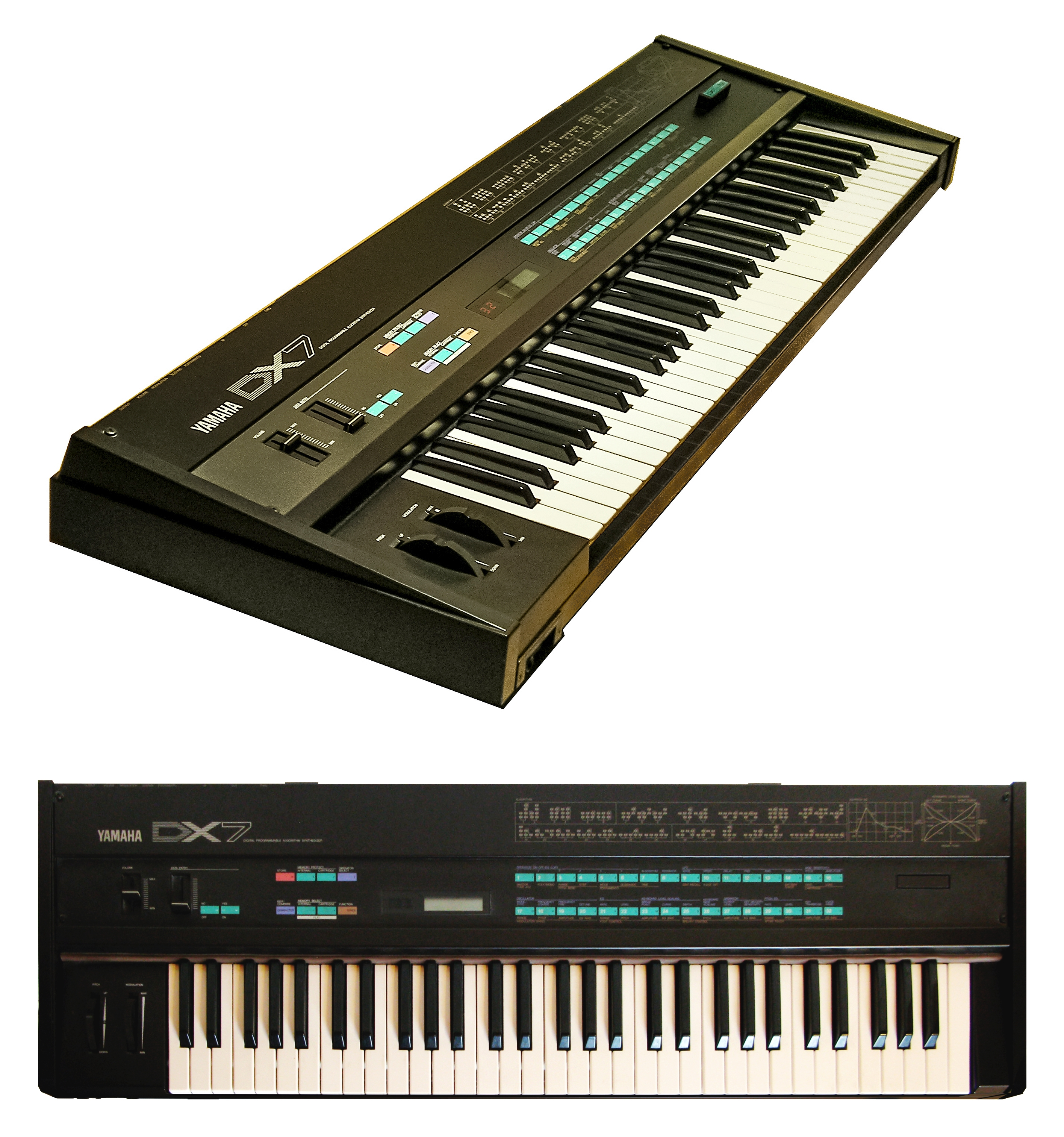
- Manufacturer: Yamaha
- Dates: 1983–1989
- Price: $1,995 US £1,495 GBP ¥248,000 JPY

Technical specifications
- Polyphony: 16-voice
- Timbrality: Monotimbral; Bi-timbral (DX7 II)
- Oscillator: 6 digital sine wave operators per voice, 32 patching algorithms
- Synthesis type: Digital linear frequency modulation / Additive synthesis (alg. #32)
- Filter: none
- Attenuator: 1 pitch envelope & 6 amplitude generators per voice
- Aftertouch expression: Yes (channel)
- Velocity expression: Yes
- Storage memory: 32 patches in RAM (battery backup); front panel ROM/RAM cartridge port
- Effects: none
- Hardware: YM2128 (OPS) operator chip YM2129 (EGS) envelope generator

Input/output
- Keyboard: 61-note with velocity and aftertouch sensitivity
- Left-hand control: pitch-bend and modulation wheels
- External control: MIDI in/out/thru, input for foot controller x2, input for foot switch x2, input for optional breath controller

The Yamaha DX7 is a synthesizer introduced by Yamaha Corporation in 1983. It was the first successful digital synthesizer and is one of the best-selling synthesizers in history, selling more than 200,000 units.

In the early 1980s, the synthesizer market was dominated by analog synthesizers. Frequency modulation synthesis, a means of generating sounds via frequency modulation (FM), was developed by John Chowning at Stanford University, California. FM synthesis created brighter, glassier sounds, and could better imitate acoustic sounds such as brass and bells. Yamaha licensed the technology to create the DX7, combining it with very-large-scale integration chips to lower manufacturing costs.

With its complex menus and lack of conventional controls, few learned to program the DX7 in depth. However, its preset sounds became staples of 1980s pop music; in 1986, it was used in 40% of the number-one singles on the US Billboard Hot 100. Its electric piano sound was particularly widely used, especially in power ballads. The English musician Brian Eno was proficient at programming his own sounds, and it was instrumental to his work in ambient music. Chips based on the DX7 sound chip, such as the YM2612, were used in technologies such as the Sega Genesis game console.

The DX7 was succeeded by FM synthesizers including the DX1, DX21, DX27 and DX100. In later years, its sounds came to be seen as dated or clichéd and its use declined. In 2015, Yamaha released a smaller FM synthesizer, the Reface DX.

== Development ==
By the mid-20th century, frequency modulation (FM), a means of carrying sound, had been understood for decades and was widely used to broadcast radio transmissions. In the 1960s, at Stanford University, California, John Chowning developed FM synthesis, a means of using FM to generate sounds that differed from subtractive synthesis. In 1971, to demonstrate its commercial potential, Chowning used FM to emulate acoustic sounds such as organs and brass. Stanford patented the technology and hoped to license it, but was turned down by American companies including Hammond and Wurlitzer. Chowning felt their engineers did not understand FM.

At the time, the Japanese company Yamaha was the world's largest manufacturer of musical instruments but had little market share in the United States. One of their chief engineers visited Stanford to view the technology. According to Chowning, "In ten minutes he understood ... I guess Yamaha had already been working in the digital domain, so he knew exactly what I was saying." Yamaha licensed the technology for one year to determine its commercial viability, and in 1973 its electric organ division began developing a prototype FM monophonic synthesizer, assisted by Chowning. In 1975, Yamaha negotiated exclusive rights for the technology.

Ikutaro Kakehashi, the founder of the Japanese company Roland, was also interested, but met Chowning six months after Yamaha had agreed to the deal. Kakehashi later said Yamaha were the natural partners in the venture, as they had the resources to make FM synthesis commercially viable.

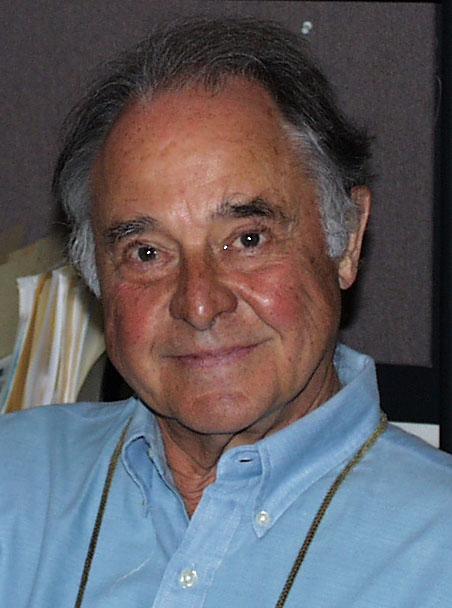
John Chowning, who developed the frequency modulation technology used in the DX7

Yamaha created the first hardware implementation of FM synthesis. The first commercial FM synthesizer was the Yamaha GS1, released in 1980, which was expensive to manufacture due to its integrated circuit chips. At the same time, Yamaha was developing the means to manufacture very-large-scale integration chips. These allowed the DX7 to use only two chips, compared to the GS1's 50. Yamaha also altered the implementation of the FM algorithms in the DX7 for efficiency and speed, producing a sampling rate higher than Stanford's synthesizers. Chowning felt this produced a noticeable "brilliant" sound.

Yamaha displayed a prototype of the DX7 in 1982, branded the CSDX in reference to the Yamaha CS range of analog synthesizers. In late 1982, Dave Bristow and Gary Leuenberger, experts on the Yamaha CS-80, flew to Japan to develop the DX7's voices. They had less than four days to create the DX7's 128 preset patches. The DX7 was released in 1983.

== Features ==
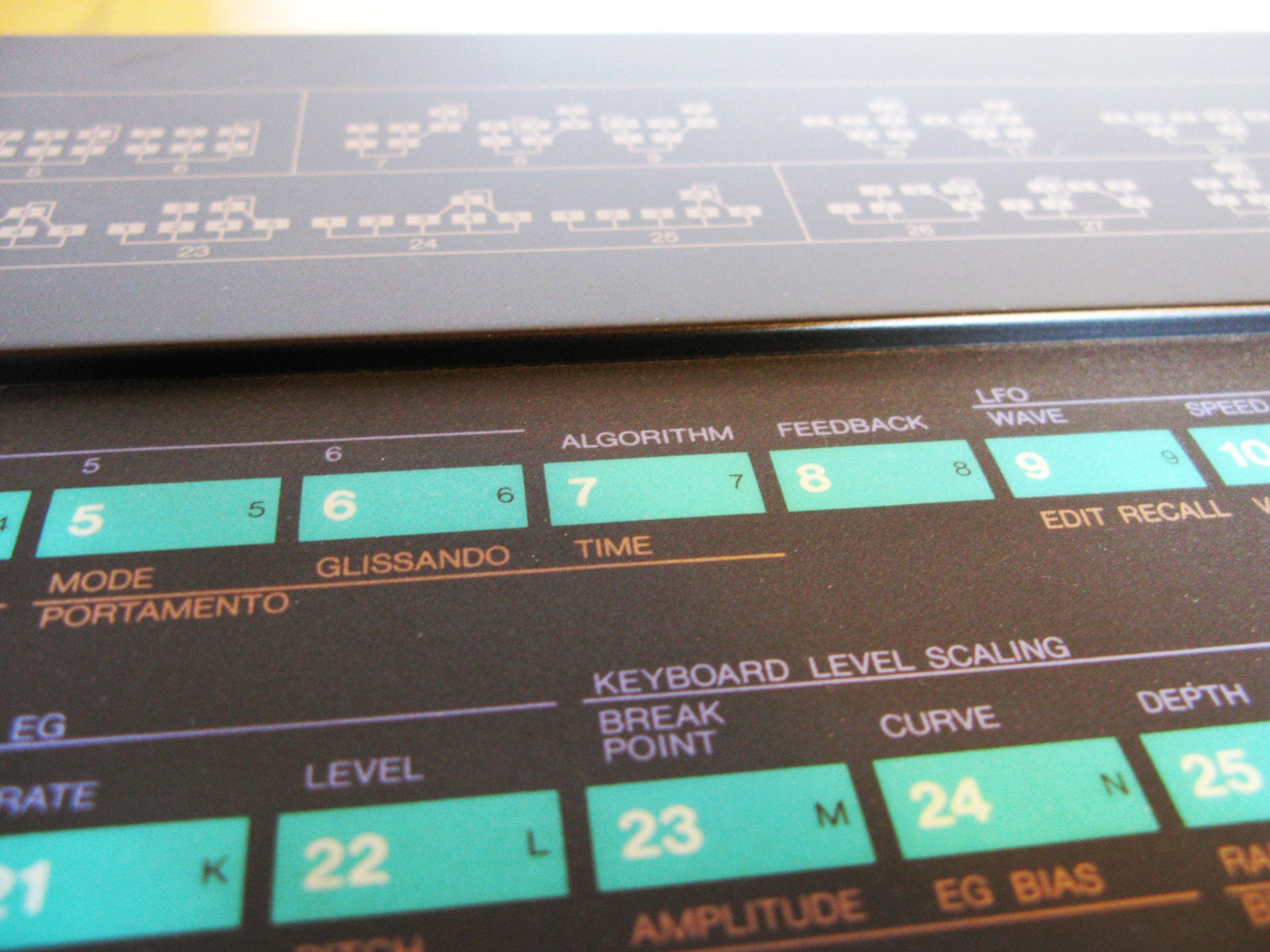
The settings buttons include controls for effects such as portamento.

Compared to the "warm" and "fuzzy" sounds of analog synthesizers, the DX7 sounds "harsh", "glassy" and "chilly", with a richer, brighter sound. Its presets constitute "struck" and "plucked" sounds with complex transients. Its keyboard has five octaves, and the keyboard expression allows for velocity sensitivity and aftertouch. The DX7 has 16-note polyphony, meaning 16 notes can sound simultaneously. It has 32 sound-generating algorithms, each a different arrangement of its six sine wave operators. The DX7 was the first synthesizer with a liquid-crystal display and the first to allow users to name patches. The cartridge slot allows for extra storage and for users to share patches. The cartridges use MIDI-SYSEX, a subset of the MIDI protocol.

== Sales ==
The DX7 was the first commercially successful digital synthesizer. According to Bristow, Yamaha had hoped to sell more than 20,000 units. Within a year, orders exceeded 150,000 units, and Yamaha sold 200,000 in three years. It is one of the bestselling synthesizers.

The DX7 was the first synthesizer to sell more than 100,000 units. Yamaha manufactured units on a scale American competitors could not match; by comparison, the American company Moog sold 12,000 Minimoog synthesizers in 11 years, and could not meet demand. For years, the FM patent was one of Stanford's highest earning patents. Chowning earned royalties for Yamaha's FM synthesizers.

According to Dave Smith, the founder of the American synthesizer company Sequential, the synthesizer industry was "tiny" in the 1970s, which changed with the DX7. Smith said it sold well as it was reasonably priced, had keyboard expression and 16 voices, and was better at emulating acoustic sounds than competing products. Chowning credited the success to the combination of his FM patent with Yamaha's chip technology.

== Impact ==
At the time of release, the DX7 was the first digital synthesizer most musicians had used. It differed from the analog synthesizers that had dominated the market; according to MusicRadar, its "spiky" and "crystalline" sounds made it "the perfect antidote to a decade of analog waveforms". It was praised for its accuracy in reproducing tubular bells, metallophones and the harpsichord, and took over the electric piano market.

"Danger Zone", a 1986 single by Kenny Loggins, uses the DX7 "Bass 1" preset.

With complex submenus displayed on an LCD and no knobs and sliders to adjust the sound, many found the DX7 difficult to program. MusicRadar described its interface as "nearly impenetrable", with complex settings accessed through "tedious menus and a diminutive display". Rather than create their own sounds, most users used the presets. An industry formed around selling cartridges of additional patches.

The Japanese musician Ryuichi Sakamoto was an early user, on Mari Iijima's 1983 album Rosé and Sakamoto's 1984 solo album Ongaku Zukan. The DX7 was widely used in 1980s pop music, in hits such as "When Doves Cry" by Prince, "The Best" by Tina Turner, "Smooth Operator" by Sade and "Smooth Criminal" by Michael Jackson. The "Bass 1" preset was used in songs such as "Take On Me" by A-ha, "Danger Zone" by Kenny Loggins, and "Fresh" by Kool & the Gang. The "Bass 2" preset was used for the main riff on "Take My Breath Away" (1986) by Berlin.

The "E Piano 1" preset became particularly famous, especially for power ballads. It was used by artists including Whitney Houston, Chicago, Phil Collins, Luther Vandross, Billy Ocean, Celine Dion and George Michael. It was also used in the theme tune of the television series Twin Peaks and the 1996 video game Super Mario 64. In 1986, the "E Piano 1" preset was used in 40% of the number-one singles on the US Billboard Hot 100, 40% of country number ones, and 60% of R&B number ones. The preset imitates a Rhodes piano, prompting some to abandon the Rhodes in favor of the DX7.

A few musicians skilled at programming the DX7 found employment creating sounds for other acts. The English musician Brian Eno learned to program the DX7 in depth and used it to create ambient music on albums such as Apollo: Atmospheres and Soundtracks (1983). He shared instructions for recreating his patches in a 1987 issue of Keyboard. Eno used the DX7 on records he produced by U2 and Coldplay.

In later years, the DX7 sounds came to be seen as dated or clichéd, and interest in FM synthesis declined, with second-hand digital synthesizers selling for less than analog. The development of software synthesizers such as Native Instruments FM8 led to a resurgence in the popularity of FM synthesis.

== Successors ==
In the mid-1980s, Yamaha released numerous cheaper FM synthesizers. A desktop module version, the TX7, was released in 1985. In 1987, Yamaha released the DX7II, which did not match the success of the DX7. Further successors include the TX81Z, DX1, DX11, and DX21. Yamaha manufactured reduced versions of the DX7 sound chip, such as the YM2612, for use in technologies such as the Sega Genesis game console. In 2015, Yamaha released a smaller FM synthesizer, the Reface DX. As the DX7 is a digital synthesizer, its sound can be accurately recreated in software synthesizers, such as Dexed, without the need for complex analog synthesis modelling.
