= Vox Continental =

Portable electronic organ

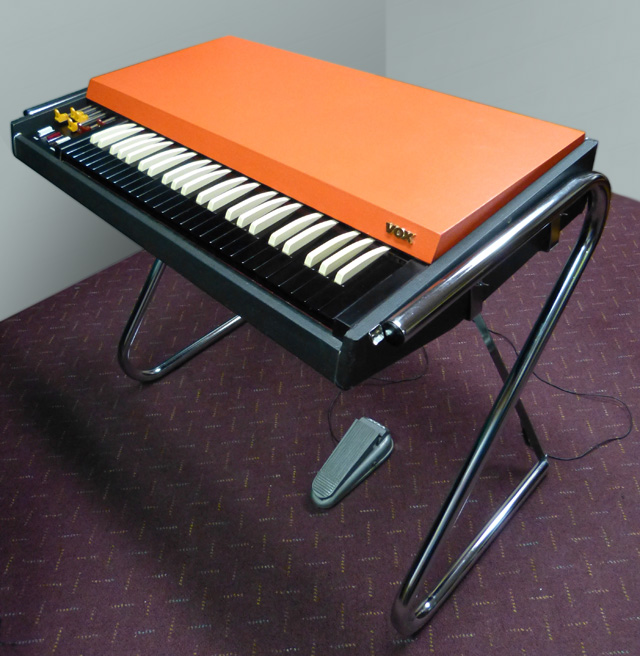
- A single-manual Vox Continental
- Manufacturer: Vox
- Dates: 1962–1971, 2017

Technical specifications
- Polyphony: Full
- Synthesis type: Electronic
- Effects: Vibrato (single speed)

Input/output
- Keyboard: 49 keys (reverse colour)

The Vox Continental is a transistorised combo organ that was manufactured between 1962 and 1971 by the British musical equipment manufacturer Vox. It was designed for touring musicians and as an alternative to the heavy Hammond organ. It supports drawbars in a similar manner to the Hammond, and has distinctive reverse-coloured keys. The sound is generated by a series of oscillators, using a frequency divider to span multiple octaves.

The first Continentals were produced at Vox's manufacturing plant in Dartford, England; after arranging a deal with the Thomas Organ Company, later models were produced in the US and Italy. The most popular model was the single-manual Continental, but other models were produced, such as the budget Vox Jaguar, various dual-manual organs, and the experimental Guitar Organ and Voxmobile, based on the Vox Continental's internals.

The Continental became a popular instrument in the 1960s and 1970s, especially with garage and later new wave bands, and was used by the Beatles, the Animals, the Doors, Iron Butterfly, Elvis Costello, and Madness. After being phased out of production in the early 1970s, the instrument remained a sought-after combo organ by enthusiasts. Japanese manufacturer Korg bought the Vox name, producing a new version of the Vox Continental in 2017, and various modern stage keyboards include an emulation of the organ.

== Description ==
Vox Continental
The sound of a Vox Continental, showing drawbars and vibrato

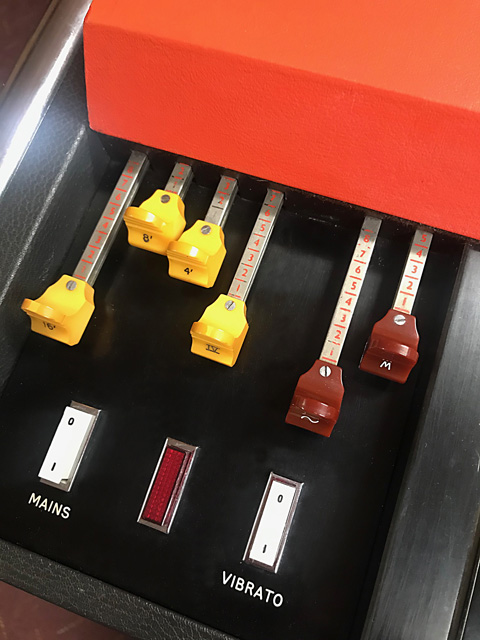
Vox Continental drawbars

The Continental had two basic designs, each with its own variations. They were the single-manual Continental, and the dual-manual model called the Vox Continental II in England and the Vox Super Continental in Italy. Each manual features 49 reverse-coloured keys (black naturals and white sharps) as on a harpsichord. The organ comes with a chrome Z-shaped bolt-on leg stand assembly. The top of the organ is furnished with an orange Rexine cover.

The Vox Continental uses six slider-type, metered volume controls called drawbars instead of the stop-tab rocker switches seen on other combo organs. Two of the drawbars on the righthand side control the voices (flute and reed tones), while the four on the left control the footages (corresponding to ranks of pipes on a pipe organ). The stock Continental has 16', 8' and 4' drawbars, with a fourth one labelled "IV" containing a mixture of higher pitches. There is a single-speed, single-intensity vibrato whose rate can only be adjusted by removing the lid of the instrument and adjusting a potentiometer (Note: The rate of vibrato can be adjusted by removing the lid and adjusting a potentiometer). The Continental has no other internal effects. A bass pedalboard was available as an optional extra.

Dual-manual models also have a 5 1/3' drawbar on the upper manual, an octave of bass keys and a string bass feature. Later models also supported a percussion feature similar to that on a Hammond.

The organ's sound comes from twelve oscillators, one for each note in the chromatic scale along the top octave of the instrument. The signal from each of these is fed into a frequency divider circuit that allows the frequency to be halved, in order to produce the sound an octave lower. This is then halved again for the subsequent octave, and so on down the rest of the instrument's range, except for the lowest note, C, which has a dedicated generator. Each key is connected to four contacts connected to ground; when a key is pressed, it makes a connection to the bus bar which sends a signal to the drawbars to produce a sound.

The first Continentals were manufactured with wooden keys covered with plastic key caps. Musicians complained this gave it an unpleasant playing action. Later models switched to using plastic keys connected to metal shafts.

== History ==
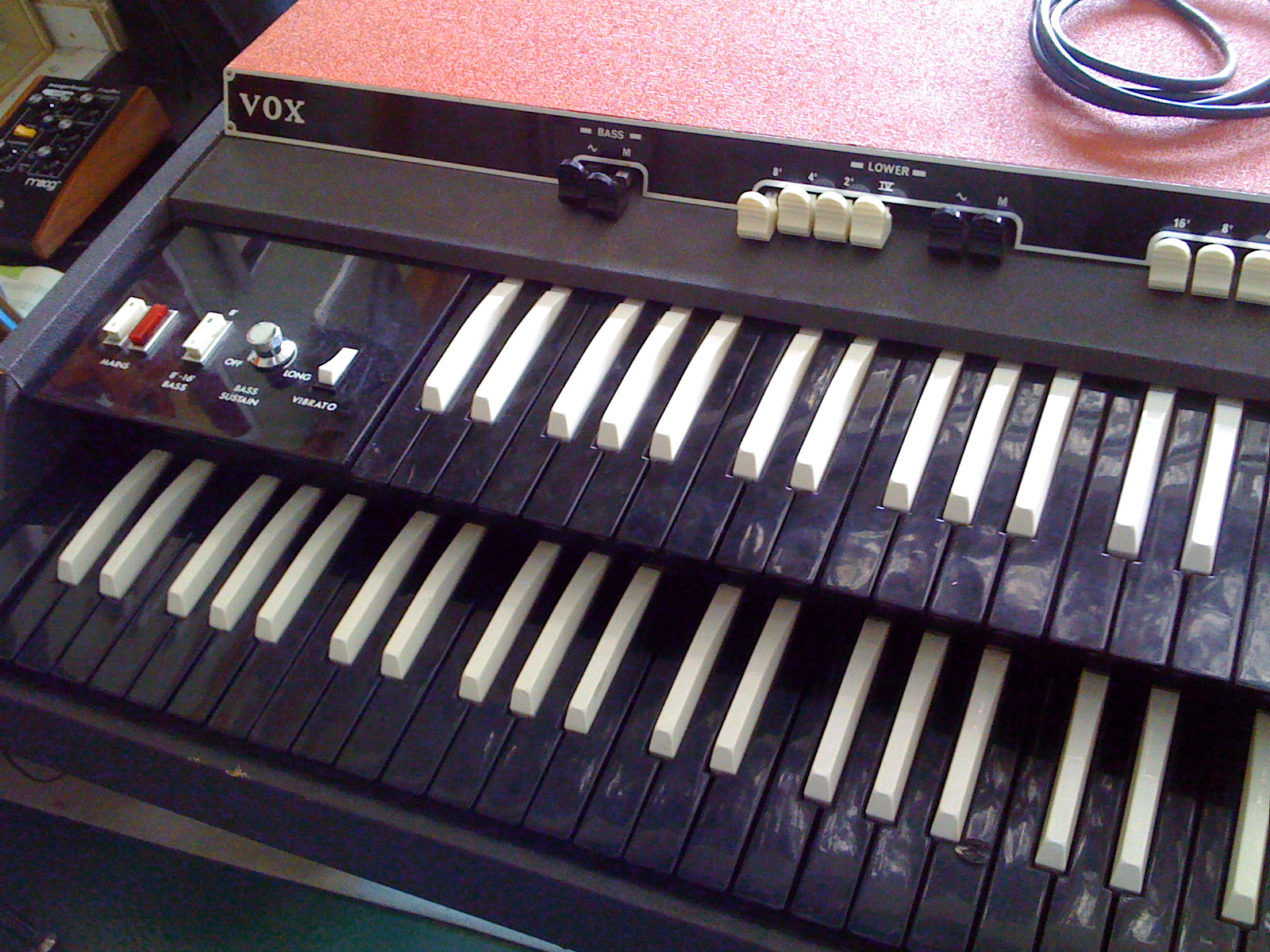
Vox Super Continental, a dual manual organ

The Vox Continental was first manufactured by the Jennings Musical Instruments factory in Dartford, Kent, in 1962. Most of the components for the organ were subcontracted to other companies, with Jennings working on the final assembly. The original cabinets were constructed by Heathpoint Timer in Rayleigh, Essex, while some of the electrics were made by Kimber-Allen in Swanley, Kent. Jennings sold part of the company to the Royston Group in 1963. Production later moved to Vox Sound in Erith, Kent. The dual-manual Continental II was introduced in 1965. That same year, the single-manual model sold for $995 ($10,200 in 2025).

The Vox Jaguar was introduced as a budget version of the Continental the following year, retailing at $495 ($4,900 in 2025), which used rocker tabs instead of drawbars. Only fundamental frequencies could be produced on the Jaguar, as it lacked the circuitry to generate additional harmonics like the Continental. The tabs allowed a choice of "flute", "bright", "brass" and "mellow", a "bass chords" option and the vibrato as found on the Continental. The bottom octave could be switched to a monophonic sub-octave bass generator, which was routed to a separate audio jack. Though the Jaguar superficially resembled the Continental, the sound was significantly different. However it was still popular, particularly in the US. The Jaguar was also sold in DIY kit form, allowing musicians to save money by finishing certain aspects of the assembly on their own.

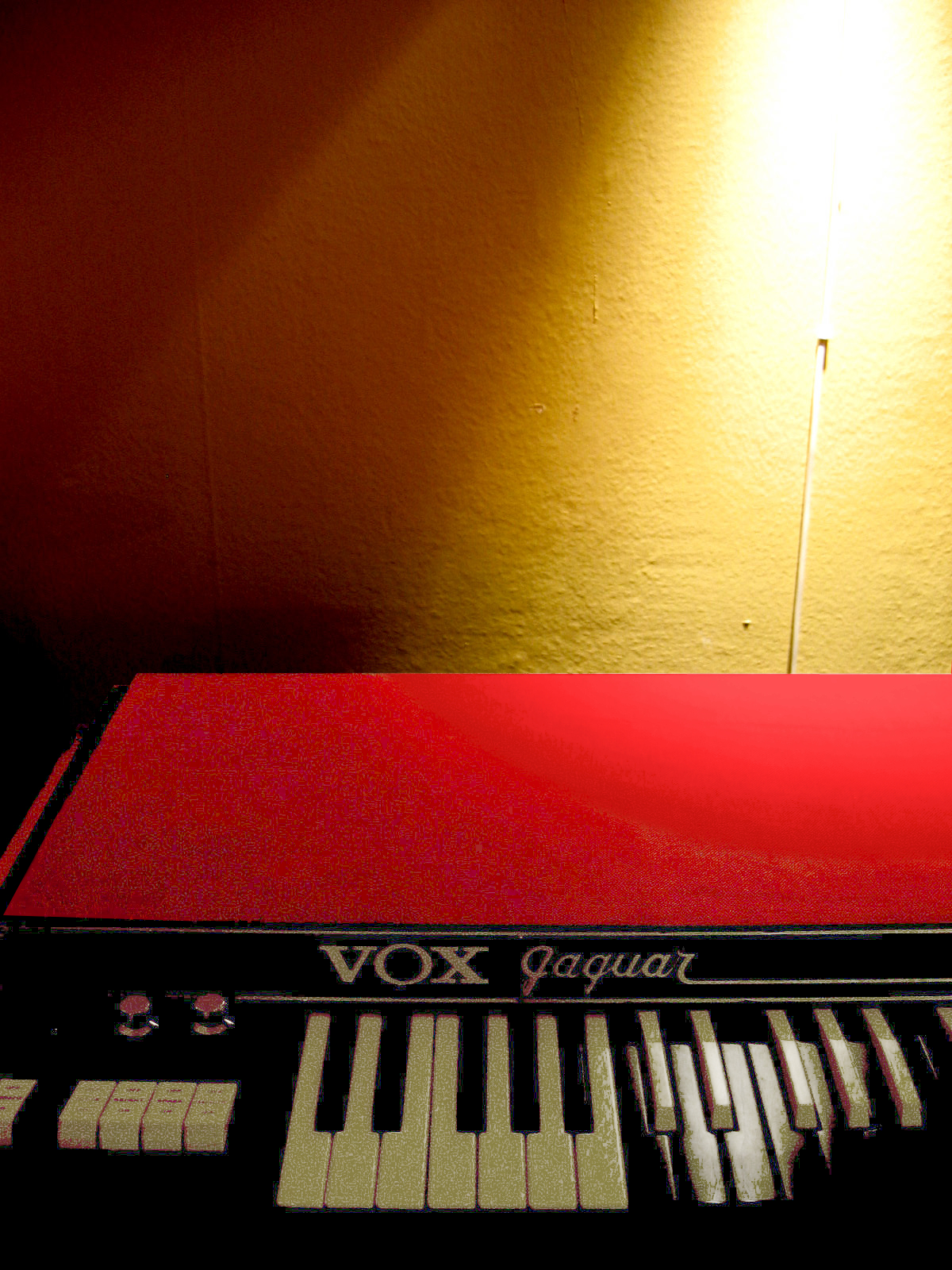
The budget Vox Jaguar used rocker tabs instead of drawbars.

The Continental quickly became popular, as it was advertised as part of the British Invasion of the mid-1960s, particularly after being endorsed by the Beatles. In order to increase supply, a licensing deal was signed between Jennings and the Thomas Organ Company in the US in 1966. Later that year, production for the US market was moved to EME in Italy for economic reasons; Thomas held a 30% stake in the EME factory, with Jennings and Royston holding 22%. The Italian Continentals used cheaper plastic keys glued to metal shafts, that were easier to break. There were also some minor cosmetic differences compared to older models, including a different vinyl covering, colours on the drawbar tips and construction of the stand. By 1969, the price of the Continental had dropped to $599 ($8,700 as of 2025).

In 1966, Vox produced the Guitar Organ, which put the internals of a Vox Continental in a Vox Phantom guitar body, and used a series of contacts along the frets so that a note would sound when a string was depressed onto a fret. John Lennon was given a sample instrument in the hope he would promote it, but it was never recorded and the instrument never entered full production.

In 1967, Thomas manufactured the Voxmobile as a promotional instrument, designed by custom car designer George Barris. It combined a dual-manual Vox Continental mounted on the rear, with two oversized Vox basses forming the sides of the vehicle, and a 289ci Ford Cobra engine. The Continental Baroque was introduced in 1968, which combined the usual Continental manual with a multi-timbral one similar to that on other Thomas organs, and included a built-in amplifier. It sold for $1,598 ($14,800 as of 2025), significantly more than the Super Continental. The additional sounds included banjo, harpsichord and celeste. It was considered unreliable and expensive, and did not sell well.

Jennings struggled to retain control of Vox, and chief designer Dick Denney was fired on 19 September 1967, with employees loyal to him leaving shortly afterwards. Royston filed for bankruptcy two years later. The company was bought by Corinthian Securities, who attempted to reintroduce a range of Vox Continentals, with the price of the Super Continental reduced from $999 ($7,900 as of 2025) to $265 ($2,100 as of 2025). By then, groups were preferring to use a Hammond organ and Leslie speaker instead of a Vox. Most of the remaining assets were sold at a liquidation sale in 1971.

There are no definitive figures for how many Vox Continentals were manufactured. However, estimates based on serial numbers indicate 9,100 single-manual organs were manufactured. Around 4,100 of these come from the UK, followed by 4,000 from Italy and 1,000 in the US.

The Vox name was later sold to Rose Morris, who in turn sold it to Korg in 1992. Since then new products carrying the trademark Vox have been primarily for the guitar player, and the Korg trademark appears on most keyboards. In September 2017, Korg released a workstation-style keyboard named in honour of the Vox Continental and highlighting the particular Continental organ sound, competing with contemporary keyboards such as the Nord Electro. The original Vox Continental is still used by collectors of vintage instruments.

== Maintenance ==
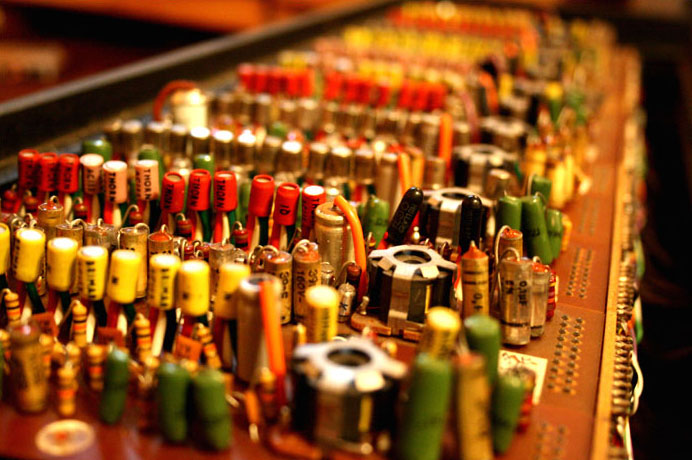
Vox Continental internal circuits and components

The Vox Continental used relatively unstable germanium transistors in its oscillators, which can occasionally drift in pitch and required to be re-tuned. The wooden keys on earlier models are more durable than later plastic ones. The organ is connected to the mains via a round three pin Bulgin connector, which was standard for the time but is no longer in general use because it does not meet modern safety standards. Some technicians have retrofitted the power supply on a Continental to take a standard IEC 60320 C14 "kettle plug" lead. The later US and Italian Continentals have a hinged lid, which allows servicing without having to dismantle the instrument.

Because the Continental was designed to be played in concert and used in touring, there are relatively few of them in good condition unless they have been repaired. Several surviving models are missing the original case carrying the stand and volume pedal.

== Clones ==
Several modern keyboards feature emulation of the Vox Continental, including the Yamaha Reface YC, and the Nord Stage and Nord C Series, and the Hammond SK series. There are also some software emulations of the instrument, including the Arturia Vox Continental V, a Virtual Studio Technology plugin that uses modelling to accurately recreate the electronics of the original.

== Notable users ==
Vox Jaguar used by The Lemon Twigs (2018)

The instrument was commonly heard in 1960s rock music, and played by the Beatles' John Lennon, the Dave Clark Five's Mike Smith and the Animals' Alan Price. Lennon played the Continental on Rubber Soul's "Think for Yourself", and regularly used it on "I'm Down" as a live set closer, such as their 1965 concert at Shea Stadium. In 2008, this model was sold at auction for $182,500. Price used it prominently on the Animals' hit arrangement of "The House of the Rising Sun". The Doors' Ray Manzarek played a Vox in combination with a Rhodes Piano Bass early in the group's career, including "Light My Fire". Paul Revere Dick of Paul Revere & the Raiders switched from a Farfisa organ to a Vox, and became endorsed by the company. John Cale used the organ with distortion on the Velvet Underground's "Sister Ray". Other hit singles released in the 1960s and featuring the Vox Continental include the Monkees' "I'm a Believer", Van Morrison's "Brown Eyed Girl", ? and the Mysterians' "96 Tears" and Iron Butterfly's "In-A-Gadda-Da-Vida". Augie Meyers' use of the instrument drove the Sir Douglas Quintet's instantly distinguishable sound.

The Grateful Dead's Pigpen switched from the Farfisa to the Continental, before moving on to a Hammond. Tom Constanten also played a Vox Continental during his tenure in the Dead, but did not like playing it and switched to a Hammond as well. Yes' Tony Kaye played a Vox Continental when the group formed in 1968, and disguised it in a Hammond organ style casing on stage, before upgrading to a real one six months later.

The Vox Continental was revived during the punk and new wave movements in the late 1970s. It was used by Steve Nieve, keyboard player for Elvis Costello & the Attractions, particularly in the early years up to This Year's Model. It was also used by several 2-Tone groups, including the Specials' Jerry Dammers and Madness' Mike Barson. Benmont Tench of Tom Petty and the Heartbreakers has also frequently used a Vox Continental, and sometimes prefers its "drier, thinner, more cutting sound". On "Don't Do Me Like That", he played one through a Leslie speaker.

In the 21st century, the organist Rhys Webb, of the UK band the Horrors can be seen using the Continental.

OMD used the Jaguar variant on their singles "Electricity" (1979), "Messages" and "Enola Gay" (both 1980).
