= Nord Stage =

Digital keyboard manufactured by Clavia

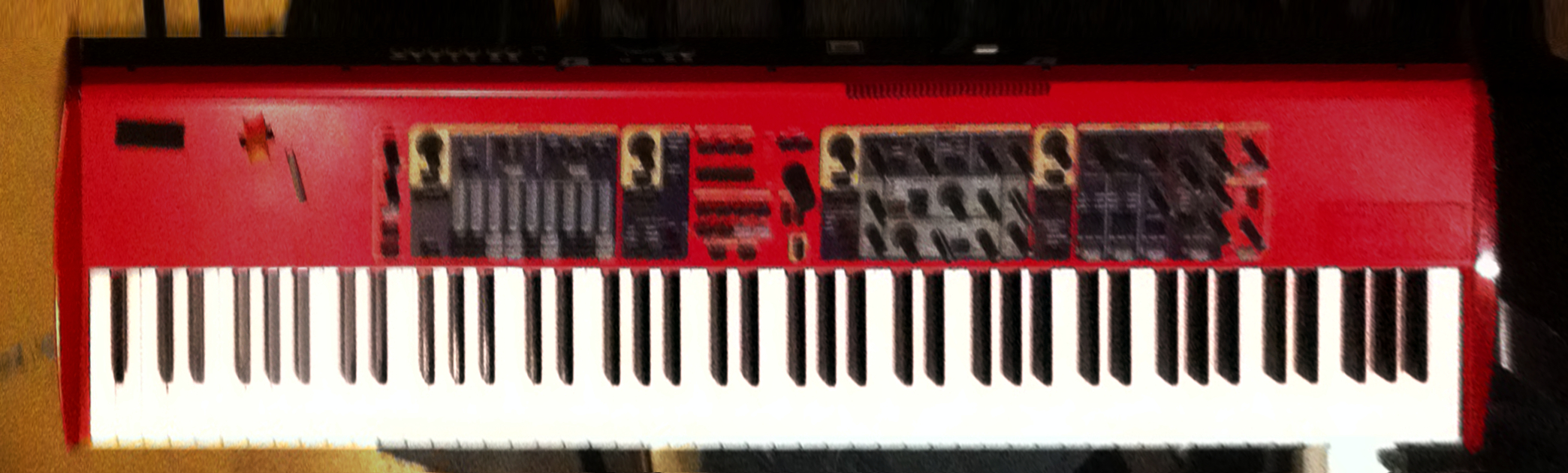
- Nord Stage 88
- Manufacturer: Clavia
- Dates: 2005–2008 (Nord Stage); 2008–2011 (Nord Stage EX); 2011–2015 (Nord Stage 2); 2015–2017 (Nord Stage 2 EX); 2017–2023 (Nord Stage 3); 2023-present (Nord Stage 4)

Technical specifications
- Timbrality: 6
- Oscillator: Square, sawtooth, wavetable, FM, modelling, sample
- LFO: Wave, sawtooth
- Synthesis type: Sample-based synthesis, Physical modeling synthesis, Analog modeling synthesis, FM modeling synthesis
- Filter: High-pass, low-pass 12/24, notch, resonance
- Aftertouch expression: Yes
- Velocity expression: Yes
- Storage memory: 400 programs
- Effects: 6 modulations, 6 effects, overdrive, rotary speaker, EQ, delay, compressor, reverb

Input/output
- Keyboard: 88-key hammer action, 76-key hammer action or 73-key semi-weighted
- External control: Sustain pedal, control / swell, rotary speed

The Nord Stage is a digital keyboard or stage piano, manufactured by Clavia Digital Music Instruments of Stockholm, Sweden. There have been six editions of the instrument: the original Nord Stage in 2005, the Nord Stage EX in 2008, the Nord Stage 2 in 2011, the Nord Stage 2 EX in 2015, the Nord Stage 3 in 2017, and the Nord Stage 4 in 2023.

The Nord Stage follows the success of earlier keyboard instruments from Clavia and contains similar emulations of vintage electromechanical keyboards such as the Hammond Organ and electric pianos as found on the Nord Electro 2, with additional functionality including a weighted piano-like keyboard on certain models, a synthesizer section based on the Nord Lead, a more versatile organ section and extended effects processing. The Nord Stage is multitimbral, which means that it can play more than one sound at once, either by splitting the internal keyboard or connecting an external MIDI controller.

The Nord Stage 2 and 3 also have the ability to play samples, allowing it to reproduce the functionality of a Mellotron or Chamberlin. Individual samples can be downloaded from Clavia's website, and a community has developed that provides new instruments and sounds.

== History ==
By 2005, Clavia had found commercial success with the Nord Lead synthesizer, which emulated analog synthesis, and the Nord Electro virtual electromechanical keyboard, which emulated the Hammond Organ and Rhodes and Wurlitzer electric pianos. The goal of the Nord Stage was to combine these two technologies together into a flagship instrument.

The Nord Stage was unveiled in April 2005 at the Musikmesse music instrument convention in Frankfurt, Germany. A full-range, 88 weighted key version, the Stage 88, began shipping in July 2005; a 76 weighted key version, the Stage 76, was announced at the NAMM Show in January 2006, and a 73 semi-weighted key version, the Stage Compact, started shipping in August 2006. An expanded version, the Nord Stage EX, was released in November 2008. It included an increased memory size.

A revised edition, the Nord Stage 2, appeared in September 2011, containing an improved synthesizer model and sampler functionality, as seen in the Nord Wave. The three models of the Stage 2 are the HA-88, containing 88 fully weighted keys, the HA-76, containing 76 weighted keys, and the SW-73, containing 73 semi-weighted keys. An updated model, the Stage 2 EX, with extended memory capacity, was announced in 2015.

The Nord Stage 3 series was announced in April 2017. It features doubled memory for the piano section (2 GB) and increased sample memory (480 MB). It also features the Lead A1 synth engine and the C2D organ engine. The models for the Stage 3 are the Nord Stage 3 88, with 88 Hammer Action keys, the smaller and lighter HP 76, with 76 Hammer Action Portable keys, and the Compact, with 73 semi-weighted waterfall keys and, like the Electro 5D, physical drawbars for the organ section.

In February 2023, the Nord Stage 4 series was announced. The Nord Stage 4 includes a new effects section, a third synth panel, and 1 GB of synth sample memory. Its synth engine is based on the Nord Wave 2 instead of the Nord Lead A1 engine used in the previous model. The keybed was updated to include a triple-sensor. The Nord Stage 4 is offered in three sizes: A 88 weighted hammer action version, a 73 weighted hammer action version, and a 73 semi-weighted waterfall version.

Like all other Nord keyboards, the Stage's metal panel is bright red, and the Stage also features similar red wood panels to the Nord Electro.

Feature history
Version	Piano sample memory	Piano polyphony (stereo/mono)	Synth sample memory	Synth polyphony	Year
Stage	128 MB	40/60	—	16	2005
Stage EX	256 MB	40/60	—	16	2008
Stage 2	500 MB	40/60	380 MB	18	2011
Stage 2 EX	1 GB	40/60	380 MB	18	2015
Stage 3	2 GB	120	480 MB	34	2017
Stage 4	2 GB	120	1 GB	48	2023

== Sound sections ==
The Nord Stage is divided into three sound groups: the Organ section, the Piano section, and the Synthesizer section. Each section can be played independently or simultaneously, divided into specific key ranges (splitting), and blended with independent volume controls.

=== Organ section ===
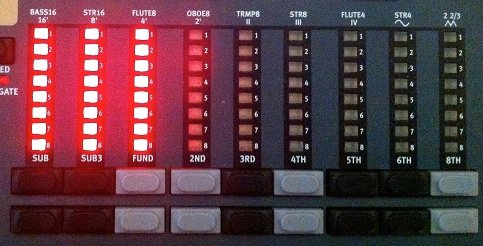
The drawbuttons in the Nord Stage's Organ section. In this example, the 16', 5 1/3' and 8' drawbuttons have been "pulled out" fully.

Farfisa Compact Organ
The Nord Stage's Farfisa Compact organ with added delay, played in the style of early Pink Floyd

The Nord Stage Organ section provides physical models of three electric organs – the Hammond B3, the Vox Continental, and the Farfisa Compact. Instead of physical drawbars, the Organ section features "drawbuttons" with a set of red LED strips to indicate the position of each drawbar from 0 (fully in) to 8 (fully out). For the Hammond and Vox organ emulations, pressing the "down" button illuminates more LEDs to visually emulate a drawbar being pulled out, while pressing the "up" button does the reverse. Since a real Farfisa organ selects sounds via rocker tabs instead of drawbars, the drawbuttons behave as tabs when the Farfisa emulation is selected on the Stage. The standard set of Percussion, Chorus and Vibrato settings as found on each of the three organs are available, and a rotary speaker emulation (similar to a Leslie speaker), including speed selection and overdrive, is also available. The Organ section is fully polyphonic. The Stage 3 Compact features physical drawbars, replacing the “drawbuttons”. These give the performer much more accurate and responsive real time control of the timbre of the organ sound.

=== Piano section ===
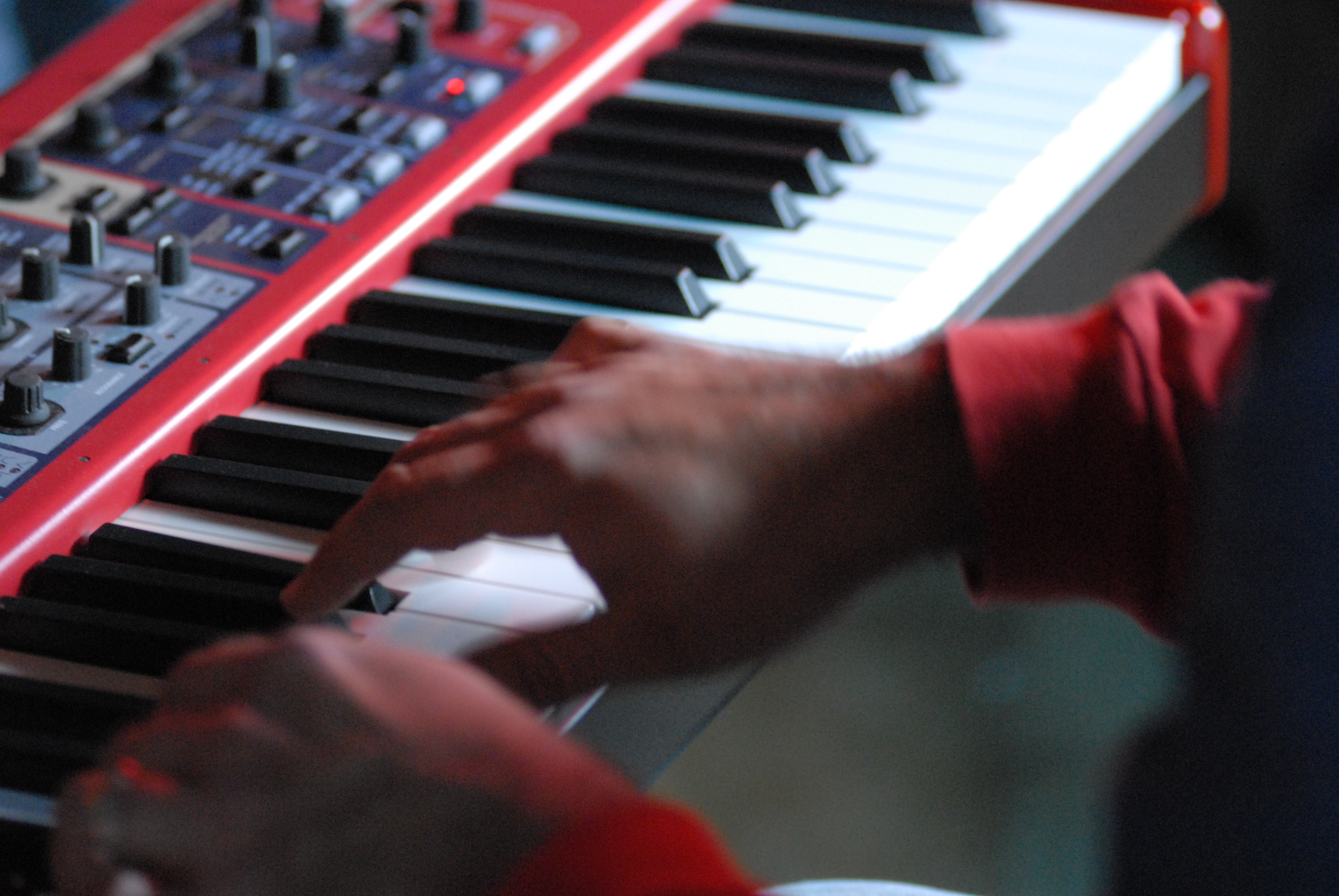
Playing a Nord Stage 88

The Piano section uses samples of acoustic and electromechanical pianos. The Stage's in-built memory allow multiple sample sets to be installed. While additional sampled piano sets are available as free downloads from Clavia's website, the Stage ships with Yamaha C7 and Steinway Concert Model D grand pianos, Svenska Pianofabriken and Yamaha M5J upright pianos, Yamaha CP80 Electric grand piano, Rhodes Piano, Wurlitzer Electronic Piano, and Hohner Clavinet samples. The Clav EQ buttons allow users to adjust the sound of the Clavinet. Acoustic Piano sounds are stereo samples, which can be switched manually to "Mono Mode", and can be played at 40-note polyphony; Electric Piano samples are mono and can be played with 60-note polyphony.

=== Synthesizer section ===
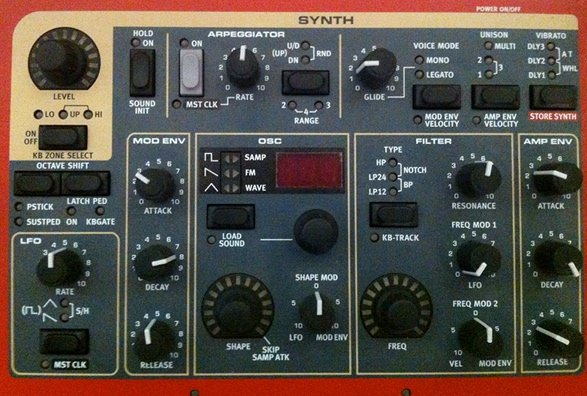
The synthesizer panel on a Nord Stage

The Stage Synthesizer combines wavetables with analog oscillators and FM operators. Featuring filter and envelope controls, the Synth section's timbre knob allows users to move through different sound groups. A number of programs are available to store sounds under three categories – Synth, Pad or Bass. The Synth also includes a 2-band EQ, a glide (portamento) function, and a unison function which is used to thicken the sound. The Synth section is 16-note polyphonic.

Mellotron Strings
Mellotron strings on a Nord Stage 2

The Nord Stage 2 introduced the additional capability to act as a sampler, playing back pre-recorded instrument sounds. Samples can be downloaded from both Clavia's and third-party websites, and installed using a software application running on a PC or a Mac. Amongst the samples included as standard with the Nord Stage 2 and 3 are those for the Mellotron and Chamberlin tape-based keyboards, which have been exclusively licensed to Clavia. Users can also create their own samples and load them into the Stage using the tools supplied.

=== External section ===
The External section, unlike the others, does not directly generate sound. Instead, it allows users to control other gear connected via MIDI. Common parameters such as zone, channel, and volume are controllable from the Stage.

== Other features ==
=== Effects ===
Wurlitzer + phaser + tremolo
The Nord Stage's Wurlitzer electric piano emulation, with phaser and tremolo effects, in a similar style to Supertramp

The Stage's Effects section expands on the Electro's effects selection. Included are the Electro's modulation effects (tremolo, auto-pan, ring modulation, auto-wah, and two manual wah algorithms), "stomp box" effects (two algorithms each of phaser, flanger and chorus). The Stage adds a delay module, amplifier modeling (Wurlitzer speaker, Fender Twin Reverb and Roland Jazz Chorus), overdrive, and expands the Electro's 2-band EQ to 3-band. Piano, Organ, and Synth sections can be independently routed through these groups. Two Master Effects are included – a simple compressor, and a five-algorithm reverb.

=== Programs ===
Sounds can be stored as Programs, which include the instrument source, effects types, and settings. There are 400 storage locations – 4 banks with 100 programs in each – all of which can be overwritten with user programs. There are 300 independent storage locations for Synth patches.

The Nord Stage is multitimbral – each of the Piano, Organ, and Synth sections can sound independently. There are two Panels – A and B – each of which provides a separate configuration of the three sections within a single Program. Panels can be played independently, with one of the panels being controlled via an external MIDI keyboard controller, or they can be layered together, allowing for a maximum of 6 part multitimbral. Most of the buttons and knobs on the Stage, such as volume, instrument selection, drawbar levels (for organ) or filter controls (for synthesizer) can also be adjusted by the external keyboard.

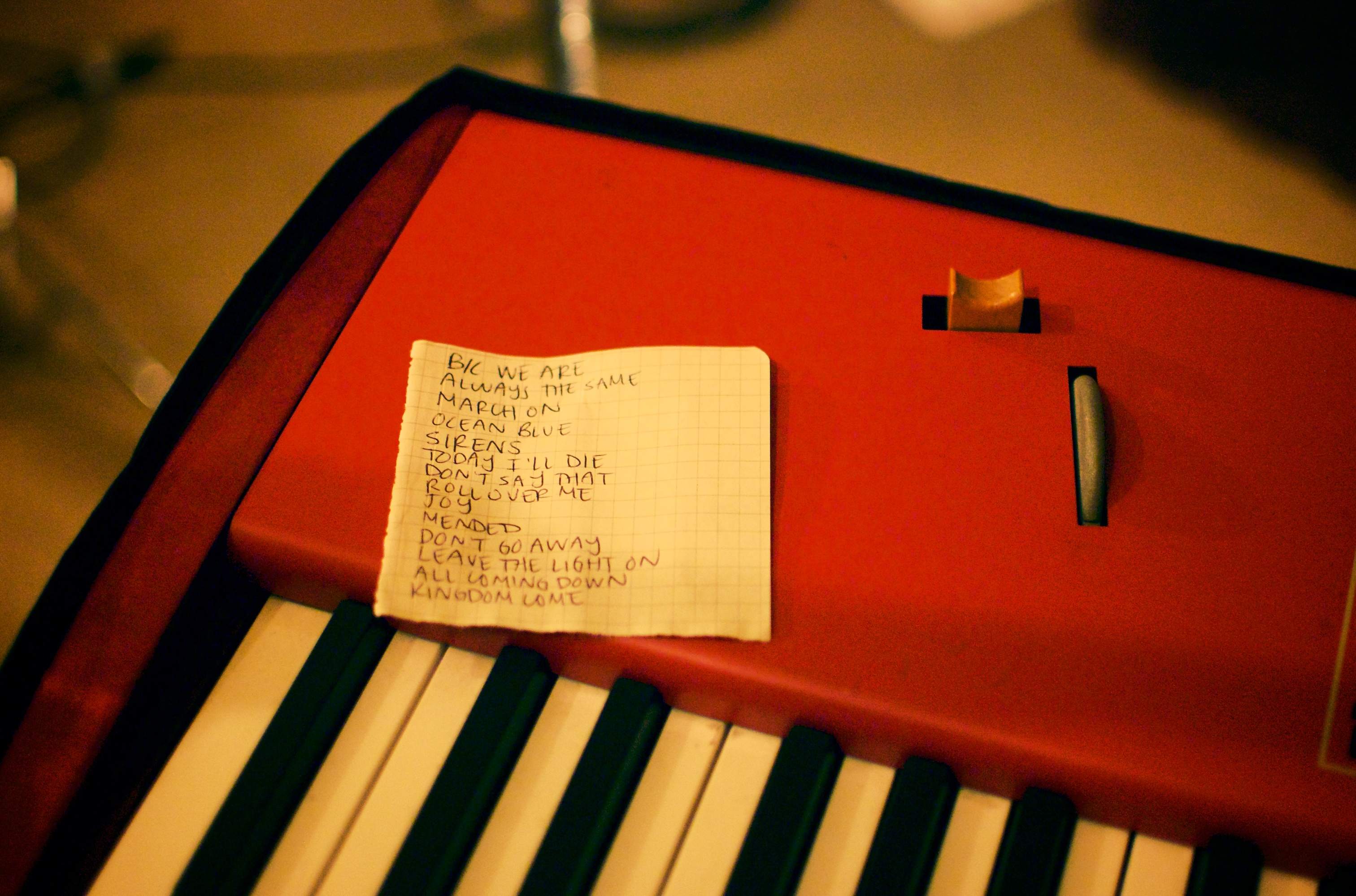
The left hand side of a Nord Stage 88, showing the custom pitch stick and ceramic wheel controller

=== Controllers and accessories ===
The Nord Stage includes a spring-mounted wooden pitch stick, and a ceramic mod wheel, similar to the Nord Lead and Nord Modular synthesizers.

Many of the parameter knobs are simple potentiometers, however there are several 360-degree lighted rotary encoders. These rotary encoders control parameters that can be "morphed". Morph Grouping is Clavia's technology that allows users to assign multiple parameters to one control, such as the mod wheel, a control pedal, or aftertouch.

The connectors at the back of the Stage allow the connection of a sustain pedal, a swell pedal for organ, a footswitch to select the rotary speaker emulation speed, and a control pedal to modify effects such as wah-wah. A set of screw-in legs are an available option for the 88 and 76 note models and a custom designed soft case is also available from Clavia. A third party company, Ocean Beach Digital, has manufactured a set of MIDI controlled drawbars for the Nord Stage, for users who prefer to use real drawbars instead of the buttons provided as standard.

== Reception ==
The Nord Stage 2 received a Platinum award from Future Music magazine (who described it as "A huge upgrade, cementing its status as the most authentic stage piano/organ/synth available"), and won the 2011 MIA Award for best hardware, and the 2011 MIPA Award for best Stage Piano.

Derek Sherinian, already well known for using Nord keyboards, started using the Nord Stage 2 in 2011. Other notable musicians who have used the Nord Stage include Little Feat's Bill Payne, Scott Kinsey, The Ark's Jens Andersson (who played a Nord Stage 2 on the band's final tour), Bryan Ferry and Elbow.

Sound on Sound criticised the pitch stick on the Nord Stage, noting its range is permanently fixed to two semitones and cannot be adjusted. Performing Musician magazine felt that the piano sound "is a little uneven in places", particularly towards the lower end, and were concerned it wouldn't work well as a music workstation, describing its External section as "useless in any real-world situation", though they did praise the quality of the organ sounds. Reviewing the Stage 2, Keyboard Magazine criticised the lack of MIDI thru and said "even with dedicated controls for most functions, it can be difficult to grasp at first. The few hardware buttons for changing programs are shared with Live settings." However, they also stated the acoustic pianos sounded "beautiful". Reviewing the Stage 3, Sound on Sound found it a significant upgrade from previous models, though still raised concerns about the high price tag.
