= Synth1 =

Software synthesizer

- Synth 1 version 1.12 screenshot
- Developer: Ichiro Toda (戸田一郎) / Daichi Laboratory
- Stable release: 1.13 beta 3 (Windows) / 1.13 beta 7 (Mac) / July 10, 2014
- Type: Software synthesizer
- Website: daichilab.sakura.ne.jp/softsynth/index.html

Synth1 is a software synthesizer designed by KVR user Daichi (Real name: Ichiro Toda 戸田一郎). It was originally designed as an emulation of the Nord Lead 2 synthesizer, and has since become a unique Virtual Studio Technology instrument and one of the most downloaded VST plug-ins of all time. The software used to be a DirectX instrument plugin, but became solely VSTi from version 1.08 on. Version 1.13 was the first version to introduce a native 64-bit version of the plugin.

== History ==
Synth1 was first released as a DXi plug-in on October 9, 2002. It was updated to support the VSTi format six days later, on October 15, 2002.

Version 1.02 was released on October 27, 2002, and dealt with some of the major bugs that arose from converting the software to VST, such as a memory leak and the LFO waveform selector not working. The next three versions dealt primarily with compatibility issues.

Version 1.05a was a major update which added the ability to modulate the FM parameter, added fine tuning to the VCOs, added synchronization to the LFOs, and fixed quality issues with the ADSR envelope. The next version would not be released until September 20, 2003.

Version 1.06 added a unison mode, an automatic portamento, and new voltage-controlled filter parameters. This was the first version when Synth1 became noticeably different from the Nord Lead 2, upon which it was based.

Version 1.07, released May 3, 2006, added new parameters and effects, primarily the chorus/flanger, as well as cleaning up the GUI.

Version 1.07 would be the last version with DXi support, as version 1.08, released on April 23, 2010, discontinued the DXi version and removed the now unnecessary installer.

One week later, on the first of May, 2010, the now solely VSTi program was updated to version 1.09, which added a Phase Control function and expanded the number of voices in the polyphony and unison modes. May 2010 would contain the last of Synth1's updates for Windows, with the bug-fix version 1.10 released on the fourth, version 1.11 on the ninth, and the current version 1.12 on the twenty-third of that month. Version 1.11 added a sub-oscillator and version 1.12 added the ability to read sound banks from .zip files.

The last update, version 1.13 beta, was released October 2, 2011, and allowed Synth1 to function on Macintosh operating systems.

Toda announced on October 28, 2012 that he intended to release an iPhone/iPad version of Synth 1 "by the Spring of next year", although there have been no version updates or blog posts since.

== Synthesis ==
Synth1 is a digital synthesizer based on the Clavia Nord Lead 2 which is also a digital synthesizer. Synth1 combines the common sound synthesis method of subtractive synthesis with FM synthesis, with the first oscillator having a parameter for frequency modulation. Structurally, the software behaves as though it were a modular analogue synthesizer. MIDI from the host music sequencer goes into the arpeggiator, which then sends the final MIDI information to all active voices, which each consist of the oscillators, filter, and amplifier. The LFOs exist outside of the chain, and can modulate certain parameters of the oscillators, filter, and amplifier. The information from the voices, after the LFO modulation has been added, is then sent to the mixer. From the mixer, the sound information is sent through the equalizer, delay, and chorus modules, after which the sound data is output to be turned into audible sound by the sound card associated with the host program.

== Specifications ==
- Three oscillators, one with an FM modulation, one with ring modulation and synchronization, and one sub-oscillator. Osc 1 can operate as detuned supersaw.
- One filter section, with distortion. Five filter types: one high-pass 12 db , three low-pass: 12db - 24 db -lpdl, and a band-pass filter 12 db
- Two assignable LFOs, which can be synchronized to a host tempo.
- An arpeggiator which can be synchronized to a host tempo.
- Several built-in effects, including a tempo delay, distortion, phaser, and chorus/flanger.
- Polyphony, monophony, and legato voices.
- Unison and portamento modes
- 32 notes polyphony
- Automation
- Low CPU usage

== Recognition ==
Synth1 is the all-time most downloaded VST plug-in on KVR Audio, and was ranked number 5 on MusicRadar's list of "The 27 best free VST plug-ins in the world today".

It has over 25 thousand free patches to download online. Because Synth1's versatility, there are a wide variety of patches available.
