= Nord C Series =

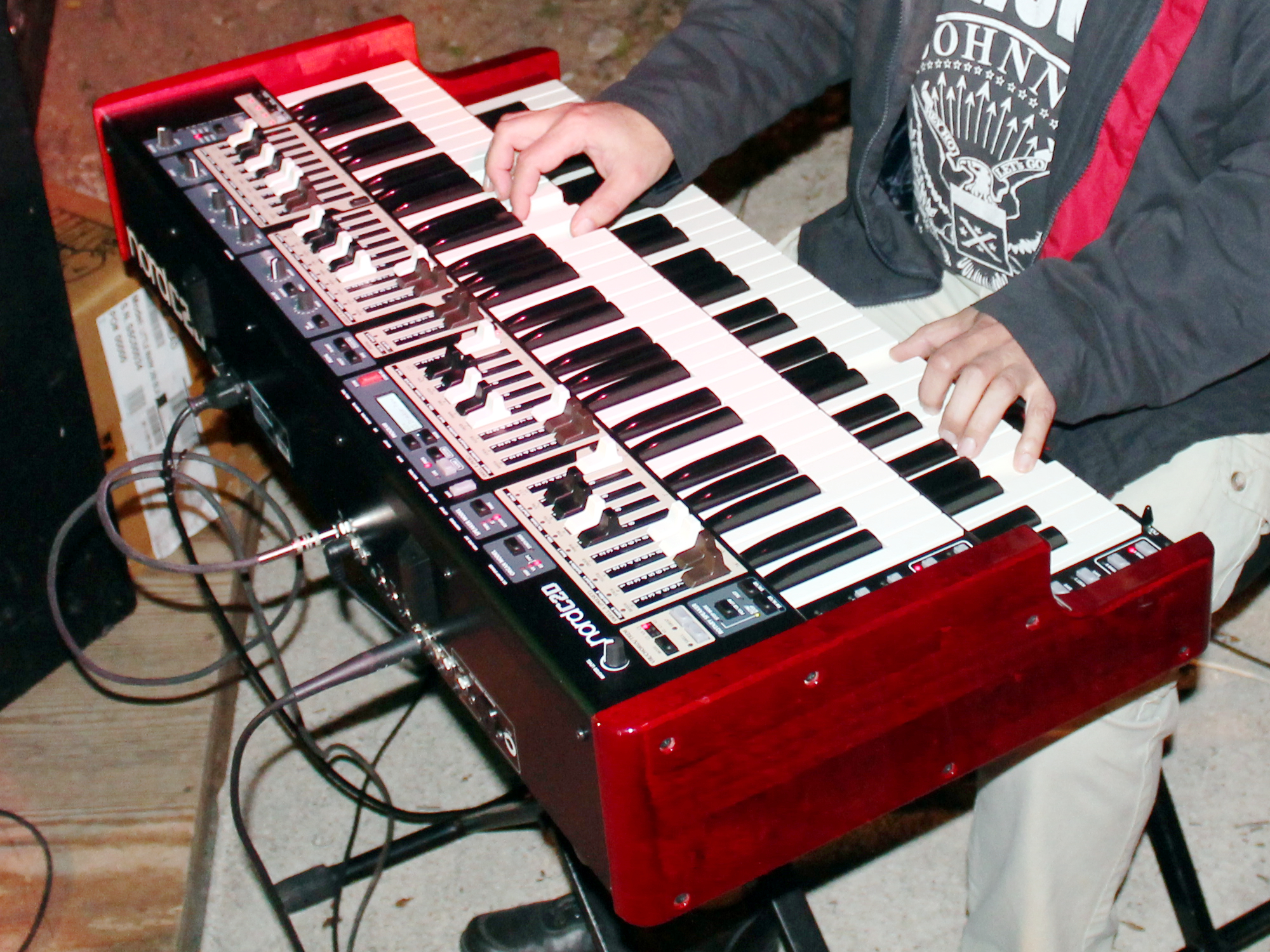
- Clavia Nord C2D (from rear)
- Manufacturer: Clavia
- Dates: 2007-2009 (Nord C1); 2009-2013 (Nord C2); 2012-2020 (Nord C2D); 2025- (Nord Organ 3)

Technical specifications
- Timbrality: 1
- Synthesis type: Physical modeling synthesis, Sample-based synthesis
- Aftertouch expression: No
- Velocity expression: No
- Storage memory: 126 programs, 400 programs
- Effects: Rotary speaker, delay, reverb, amp drive

Input/output
- Keyboard: Two 61-key manuals
- External control: Sustain pedal, rotary control, swell pedal

The Clavia Nord C1, Nord C2, Nord C2D, Nord Organ 3 are digital keyboards aimed at emulating various vintage organs. The Nord C1 was released in 2007, aimed mainly at the "gigging musician" as a digital replacement for the Hammond, Vox and Farfisa electric organs. In 2009 it was replaced by the Nord C2, which added emulation of a baroque pipe organ to widen its appeal to "churches, concert and congregation halls".

== Features ==
The original C1 contains two 61-key manuals, laid out in a similar style to a Hammond Console Organ such as the B3 or A100. The "Pedal Keys 27", an optional 27-note MIDI pedal keyboard is also available to purchase separately from Clavia.

A set of drawbuttons, similar to those found on the Nord Electro and Nord Stage control the drawbar levels of the Hammond and Vox emulations, or the voice tabs of the Farfisa emulation. Only one type of organ can be selected at once, though each manual has individual controls for the type of organ selected. There is an internal emulation of the Leslie speaker, or a real Leslie can be attached to an 11-pin amphenol connector.

The Hammond B3 emulator was improved in the C2 by providing additional click levels and emulations of other models of Leslie Speaker.

The C2's pipe organ emulation, unlike the electric organs, is generated using samples instead of physical modeling. It includes 21 stops, and provides an emulation of the swell pedal (which behaves differently from a Hammond organ) and tremulant.

In 2012 Clavia released the Nord C2D. It has the same form factor as the C2 model, but adds two sets of nine physical drawbars per manual and a set of two for the pedal board. This follows the Hammond B3 standard. Preset selection buttons has been added to the cheek blocks. The sound engine was also enhanced, including an improved key click and percussion model.

All organs have adjustable delay and reverb.
