= Nord Drum =

Drum synthesizer

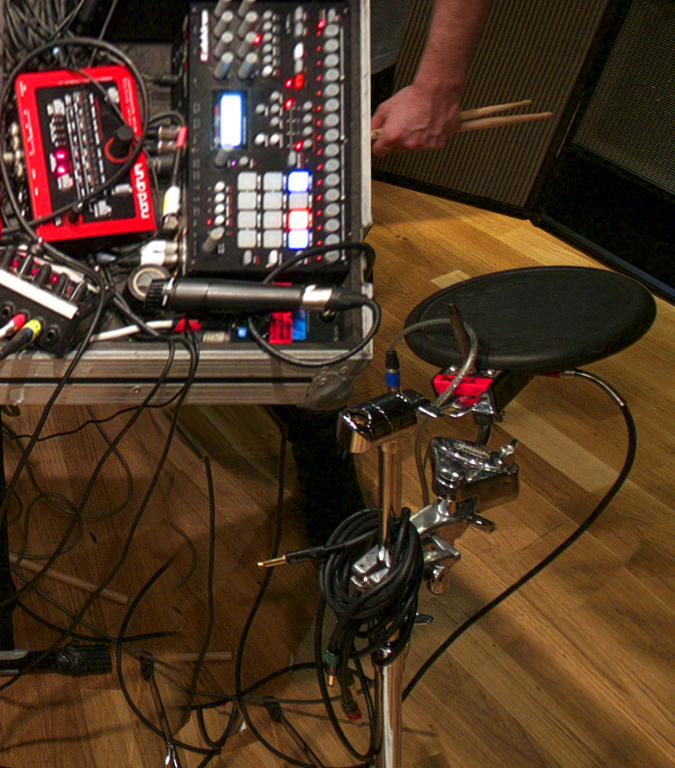
- Nord Drum (played by Aucan, 2013)
- Manufacturer: Clavia
- Dates: Nord Drum: 2012-2014; Nord Drum 2: 2014-2016; Nord Drum 3P: 2016-Present

Technical specifications
- Polyphony: 4 (Nord Drum); 6 (Nord Drum 2/3P)
- Timbrality: 4 (Nord Drum); 6 (Nord Drum 2/3P)
- Oscillator: 3: Body + Click + Noise
- Synthesis type: Virtual Analog; Physical Modelling
- Filter: 2 Low-pass filters
- Attenuator: 3 Gate + Decay
- Velocity expression: Yes
- Storage memory: 99 patches

Input/output
- Keyboard: No
- External control: MIDI in/out, 4 trigger inputs

The Clavia Nord Drum is an analog modeling percussion synthesizer. It was first introduced at the NAMM Show in 2012, and was made available in March 2012. Since then, two updated versions have been released; the Nord Drum 2 & Nord Drum 3P.

== Features ==
The Nord Drum has four channels; in other words, it is capable of playing four different drum sounds at once. Each channel can be triggered either via MIDI, or by incoming analog signals; this allows the module to be interfaced with electronic drum pads, piezo triggers, or any suitable analog signal source (such as a modular synthesizer), or controlled by a MIDI sequencer, keyboard, or other MIDI controller.

Each sound is made up of three parts: Tone, Click, and Noise. Tone is the main section of the sound, and provides the most parametric control of the three. It offers several different oscillator types, and can be tuned to give each sound a distinctive pitch. Noise allows for the addition of harsher, more percussive textures to the sound, suitable for snares, shakers, hi-hats, and the like. Click is mainly concerned with the attack of the sound, and many different click types are available, to allow the attack portion to be fine tuned.

Several of the sound parameters have the ability to respond to velocity, but notably, there is no facility for controlling parameters externally via MIDI. This issue was addressed with the introduction of the Nord Drum 2, which includes a much more robust MIDI implementation, among other improvements.

== Nord Drum 2 ==
In April 2013, an updated version of the Nord Drum was announced, dubbed the Nord Drum 2. This version added two more percussive voices, as well as two additional channel inputs for triggering each voice (giving a total of six trigger inputs, one per voice). It also added stereo outputs, mute groups, an improved synthesis engine with updated parametric controls, higher patch storage count, and individual effects per channel. The Drum 2 also features a much more complete MIDI implementation than the original, allowing for precise, individual control of nearly all synthesis engine parameters via incoming MIDI CC messages.

== Nord Drum 3/3P ==
In April 2016, Nord announced the Drum 2's successor, the Nord Drum 3, along with a version featuring six integrated trigger pads, dubbed the 3P. Both editions include an updated user interface for sound editing, 8 individual sound storage banks (in addition to 8 banks for kits), and new delay & reverb master effects. The engine was also modified slightly, seeing the removal of the attack rate/attack mode parameters, reduction in the available "click" types from 36 to 12, and addition of four new "tone" oscillator types - two modelled T-bridge oscillators, and two others based on ring modulation. Notably, the 3P lacks the analog channel trigger inputs of its predecessors, relying on MIDI for input from external pads. Though two versions (the 3 & 3P) were both originally announced, the former has yet to be made available, and is currently absent from Nord's own product catalog. To date, the 3P is the only available successor to the Nord Drum 2.
