= Nord Piano =

Digital piano developed in Sweden

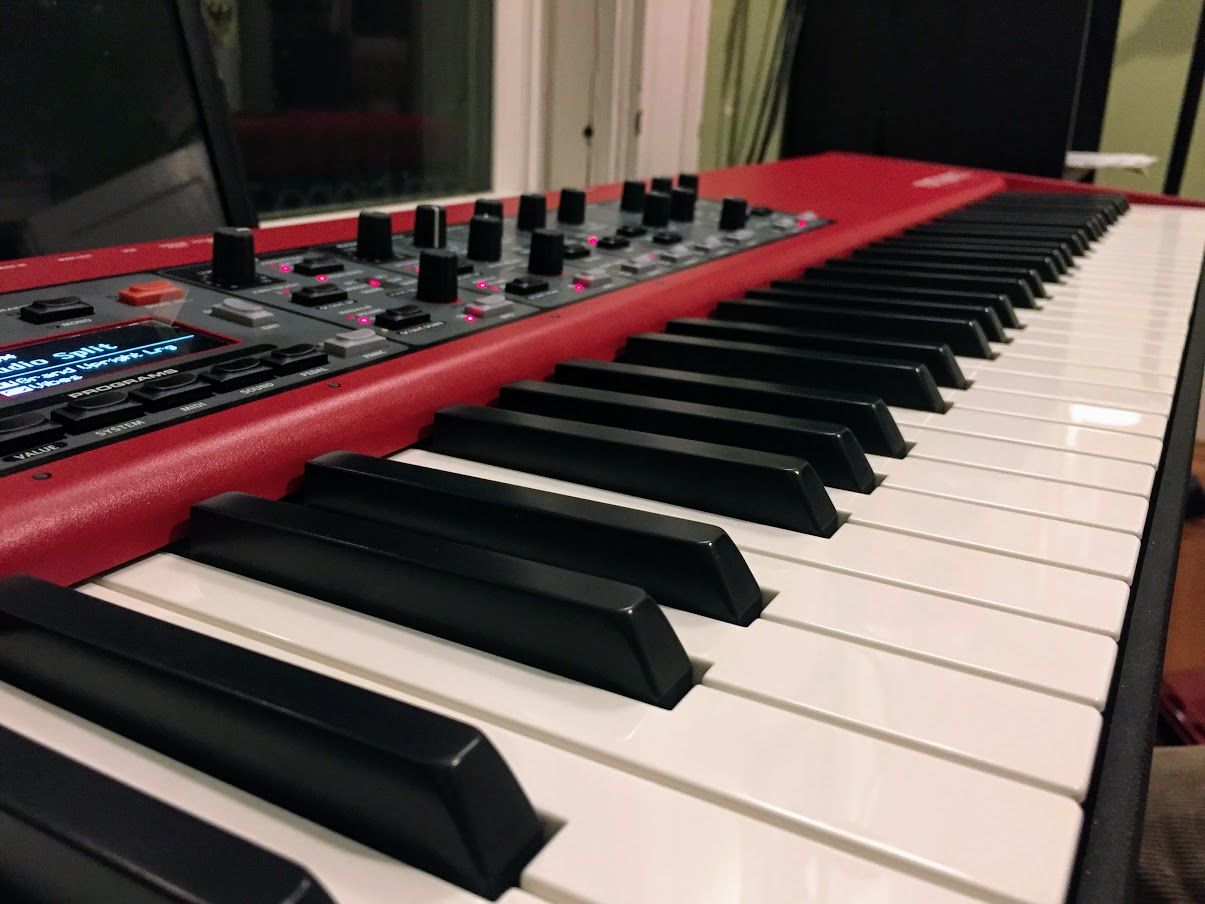
- Nord Piano 3
- Manufacturer: Clavia
- Dates: 2010 - present

Technical specifications
- Synthesis type: Sample-based synthesis
- Velocity expression: Yes

Input/output
- Keyboard: 88-key hammer action

The Nord Piano is a digital piano developed in Sweden, by Clavia. Although the Nord Pianos are sample players that can play any of the sounds in the Nord Sample Library, it is primarily intended as a replacement for the electronic or acoustic piano.

== Models ==
The Nord Piano, released in 2010, has 88 keys with hammer action, an effects section with effects such as reverb and amplifier simulations. It also has some unusual features designed to make the piano sounds more realistic, such a simulation of unplayed strings resonating in sympathy with the played strings, and samples of the pedal noises. Up to 120 programs can be used in 24 banks, with a total of 500MB RAM available for samples.

In 2012 Clavia released the Nord Piano 2. The main differences are that the Nord Piano 2 adds a second section of samples dedicated to playing non-piano samples either layered with the piano sounds or by splitting the keyboard.

At the 2016 NAMM Show Clavia launched the Nord Piano 3, which includes an improved 88-key keybed and an expanded memory (1 GB dedicated to piano samples, with 256 MB dedicated to additional samples).

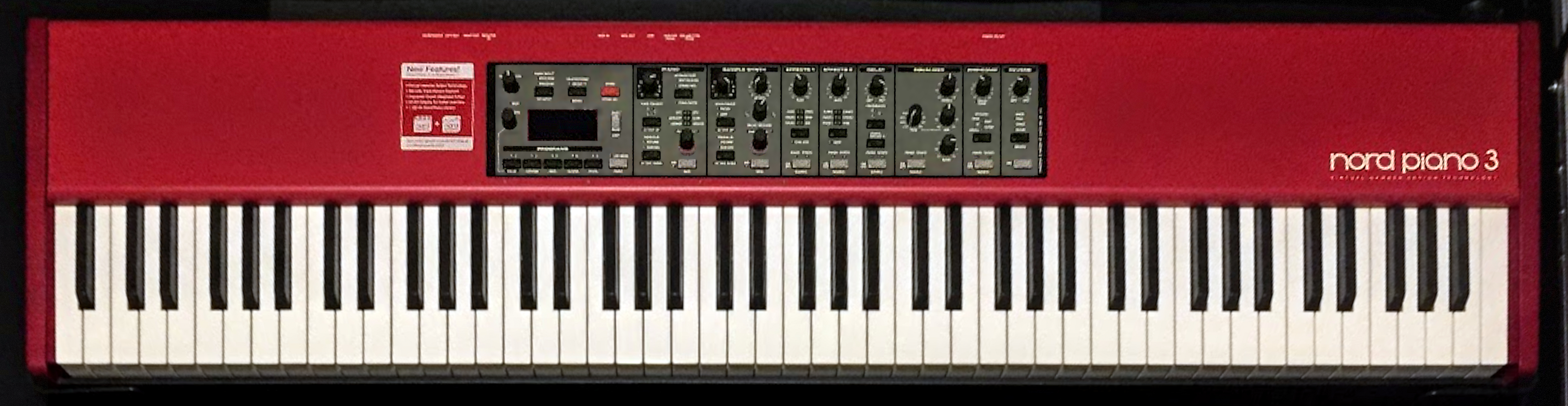
Clavia Nord Piano 3

The Nord Piano 4 was introduced physically at MusicMesse 2018 and on the web on April 11, 2018 by the manufacturer. to be available for purchase by the summer of 2018. Some of the improvements to the previous model include: 120 voice polyphony, creative piano filters, seamless transitions, 7 split points with optional split point crossfades, a doubled 512 MB memory for the sample synth section, refined organize mode, and a numeric pad mode for direct program access.

In March 2021 Nord announced the release of Nord Piano 5, adding a 73 keys version.
