= Nord Modular =

Line of synthesizers

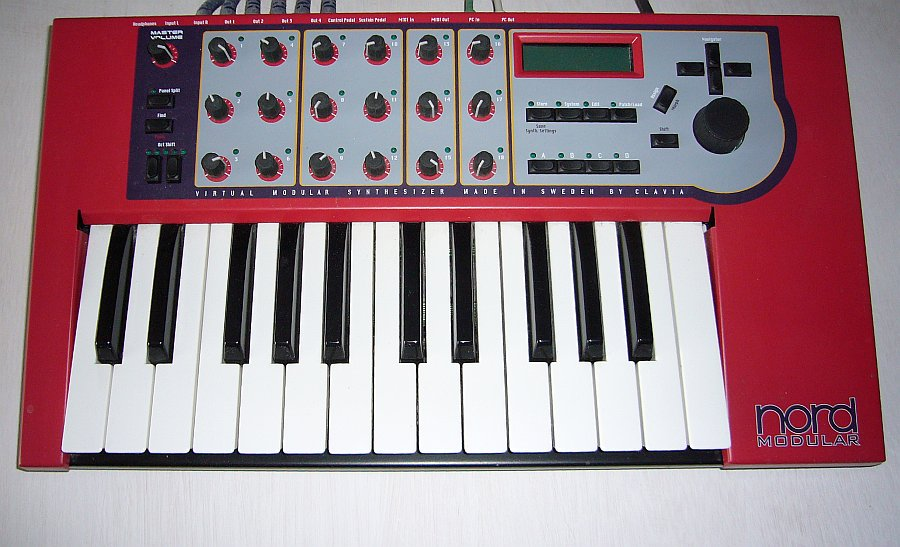
Nord Modular (Classic, keyboard version)

The Nord Modular series is a line of synthesizers produced by Clavia, a Swedish digital synthesizer manufacturer. The Nord Modular series, in common with their sister range the Nord Lead series, are analogue modelling synthesizers, producing sounds that approximate those produced by conventional analogue synths by using DSP chips to digitally model analogue circuitry.

== Overview ==
The Nord Modular range approximates the much more flexible capabilities of modular synthesizers. Unlike most other analogue modeling synth hardware, which generally simulates one or a small number of (usually subtractive ) synth circuit layouts, the Nord Modular provides an almost unlimited variation of synth architectures, with the facility to simulate, in addition to subtractive synthesis, additive, FM, and, in the second generation of the series, physical modelling synthesis methods, as well as a number of other sound generation and processing techniques.

Patch editor

Because of the flexibility offered by these synths, patches cannot be programmed from the control panel. Instead, patch editing is performed on a PC (connected via 2 dedicated MIDI ports in the case of the first generation and USB in the second generation or G2 systems), running editor software bundled with the synths.

The editor software is in appearance and function not dissimilar to computer-based modular synthesis environments like Reaktor which offer a graphical representation of the simulated modules and the associated connections between them. Unlike those systems however, the Nord Modulars are capable of functioning independently of a computer — the host computer plays no part in sound generation and is needed only to provide the patch editing interface.

Modules

The Nord Modular line of synthesizers features a range of modules familiar to users of hardware modulars: audio input and output modules, Oscillators, Low Frequency Oscillators (or LFOs), envelope generators, filters of various kinds, mixers, audio effects such as distortion and chorus, logic gates and four sequencer modules, which can be connected in almost any configuration- there is for example no restriction on connecting audio signal outputs to control signal or logic inputs (or vice versa), allowing for a great deal of flexibility in patch creation. Patches are only limited in complexity by the available DSP resources.

Polyphony

However, the more complex a patch is in general, the smaller the available polyphony is and, in practice, the specified full polyphony of the unit is only achievable when using a very small number of modules in a given patch. However, because of the flexible nature of the unit 'polyphony' does not correspond strictly to 'number of different notes sounding at one time'- indeed with some thought and careful programming it is possible to exceed the specified polyphony of the unit (by this definition of polyphony at least).

=== Nord Modular G2 ===
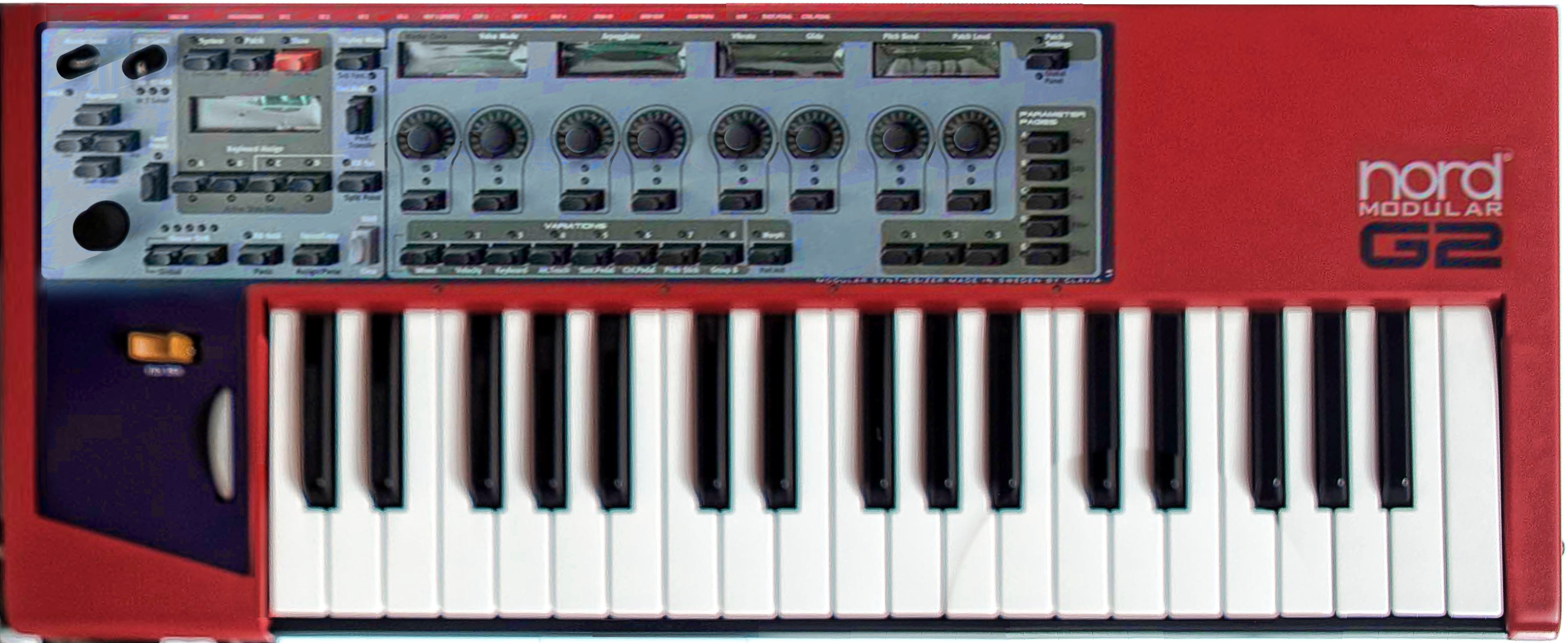
Nord Modular G2

Clavia introduced the first generation in 1998. The series was discontinued in 2004 upon the release of the next generation Nord Modular G2 series. The G2 is an updated and more powerful version of the original Modular (the G2 uses a new version of the Editor software as well), with greater polyphony and a large number of new modules to address the perceived limitations of the first generation, most notably a range of MIDI sequencing and output modules (the first generation's sequencing capabilities were limited to control of internal parameters, a restriction which many users felt to be the system's biggest limitation), time-based effects (reverb, delay, etc.), and physical modelling oscillators. However, there has been some debate in the NM community as to which generation produces the best raw sound, with many users feeling, for example, that the original series' filters had a more subjectively pleasing, grittier sound. The first G2 Modular serial number 001 was presented to Derek Sherinian by Bengt Lilja in 2004 to honor Sherinian for his high profile usage of Nord/Clavia products.

G2 series was discontinued in 2009.

== The original Nord Modular (or 'Classic') series ==
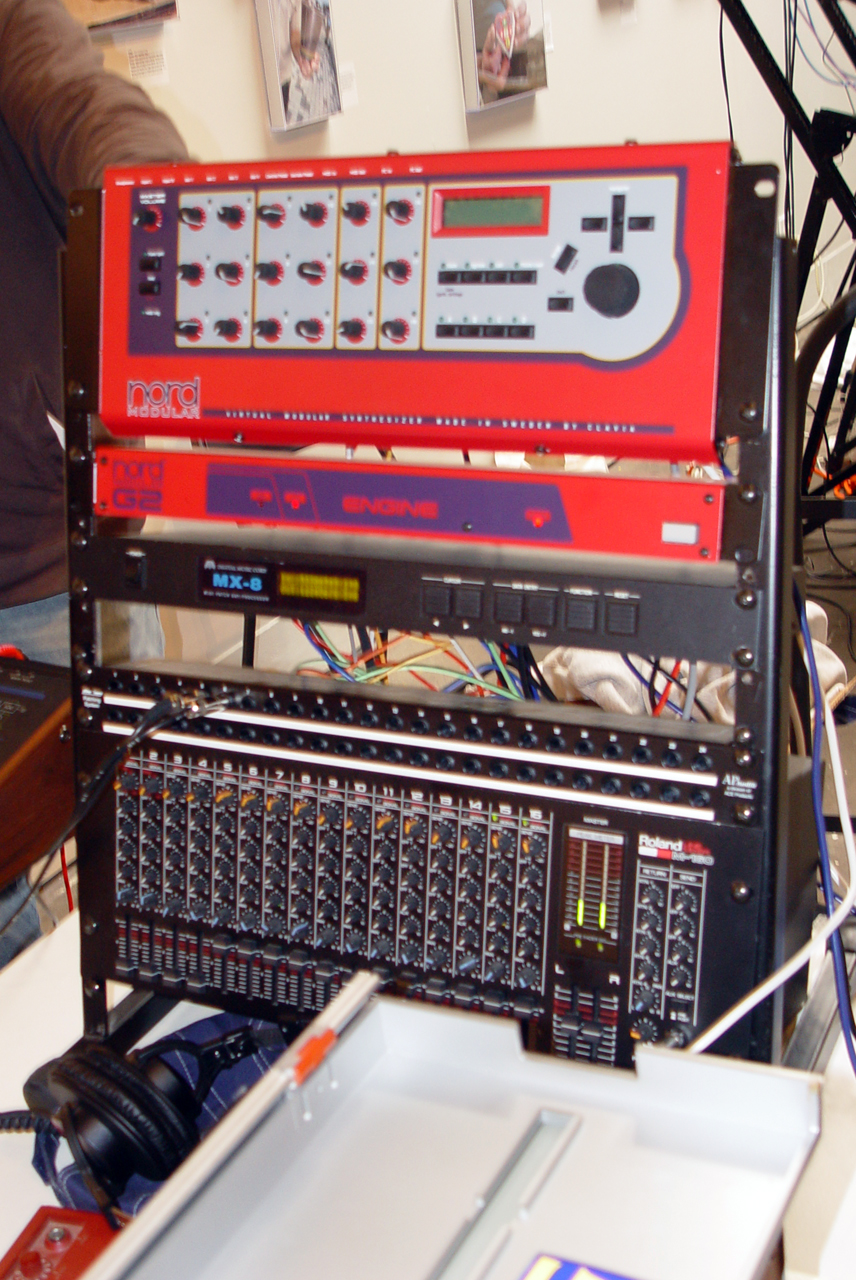
Nord Modular Rack and G2 Engine

(from the Clavia website)

The (first generation) Nord Modular family consists of three hardware models: Nord Modular Key, Nord Modular Rack and Nord Micro Modular. They are all built around the same type of electronics and use the same type of DSP. Nord Modular Key and Rack have 4 DSPs as standard (can be expanded to 8 with the Nord Modular Voice Expansion Board), and the Nord Micro Modular has 1 DSP (non-expandable).

=== Nord Modular Key and Rack ===
General

- Programmable polyphonic modular synthesizer
- Minimum 4 voices expandable to minimum 8 voices
- Maximum 32 voices depending on patch complexity
- 4-part multi-timbral
- Holds patches (sounds) and operating system in flash ram.
- Software upgradable via computer.
- Dynamic patch storage in 9 banks with 99 memory locations. The number of patches which can be stored depends on their size (i.e. number of modules used).
- 24-bit internal processing at 96kHz sampling frequency

MIDI features

- All parameters, except for the Master Level, can transmit and receive MIDI Control Change messages.
- Notes can be received over the entire MIDI range.
- MIDI clock sync.

Hardware

- 18 user-assignable editing knobs
- 18 dedicated function buttons
- Rotary dial
- 2×16 character backlit LCD
- Two audio inputs, analog, line level.
- 16-bit Sigma-Delta ADCs, 48kHz sampling frequency
- Four audio outputs, assignable, line-level.
- 18-bit linear DACs, 96kHz sampling frequency
- Headphone output
- MIDI In and Out for "public MIDI"
- PC In and Out for communication with computer Editor
- Control pedal, Sustain or ON/Off pedal inputs
- 2 octave velocity sensitive keyboard with octave shift buttons (+/- 2 octaves) (Nord Modular Key)
- MIDI In trig indicator (Nord Modular Rack)

Dimensions (Nord Modular Key)

- 473 mm (18.6 in)W × 264 mm (10.4 in)D × 90 mm (3.5 in)H
- Weight: 4.7 kg (10 lb)

Dimensions (Nord Modular Rack)

- 423 mm (16.7 in)W × 176 mm (6.9 in)D × 118 mm (4.6 in)H
- 19" rack mountable with supplied rack ears
- Weight: 3.2 kg (7.1 lb)

=== Nord Micro Modular ===
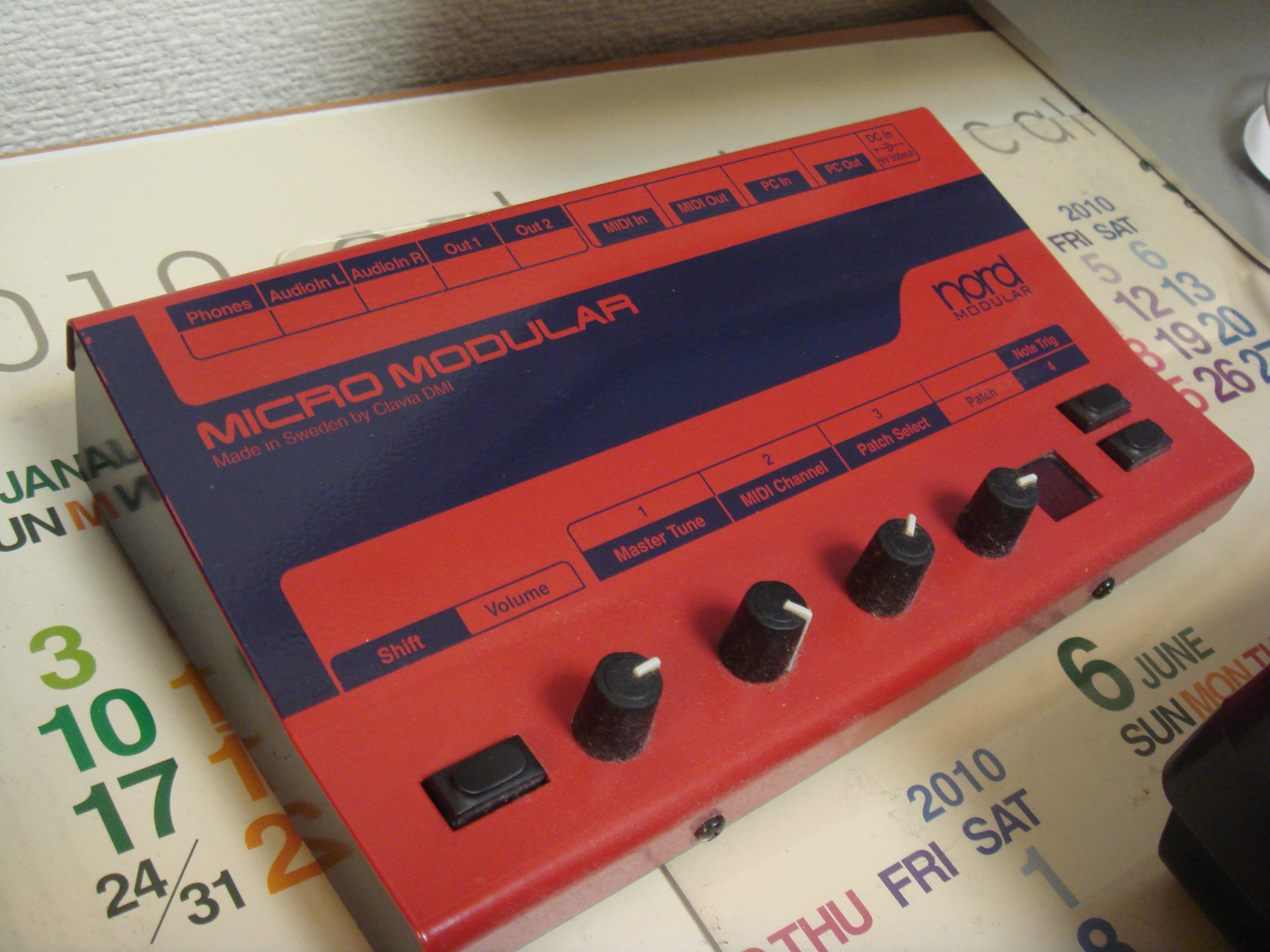
Nord Micro Modular

General

- Programmable modular synthesizer with polyphonic capacity
- 24-bit internal processing at 96kHz sampling frequency
- Maximum 4 voices (practical limit) depending on patch complexity
- 3 user-assignable editing knobs and one user-assignable button
- 3 dedicated function buttons
- 2×7-segment LED display
- Holds 99 user patches (sounds) and operating system software in flash ram. Software upgradable via computer.

MIDI features

- All parameters, except the master level, can transmit and receive MIDI Control Change messages.
- Notes can be received over the entire MIDI range.
- MIDI clock sync.

Hardware

- Two analog audio inputs, line level. 16-bit Sigma-Delta ADCs, 48kHz sampling frequency
- 2 assignable outputs, line-level. 18-bit linear DACs, 96kHz sampling frequency
- Headphone output
- MIDI In and Out for "public MIDI"
- PC In and Out for communication with computer Editor

Dimensions

- 210 mm (8.3 in)W × 120 mm (4.7 in)D × 40 mm (1.6 in)H

Used Nord Modulars can still be found for sale online.

The Nord Modular appears in the Nine Inch Nails video for Into The Void. Other known users are Autechre and Apparat.
