= Nord Wave =

The Nord Wave is a 49-key polyphonic synthesiser developed by Clavia. It integrates the playback and manipulation of samples into a virtual analog and FM synth engine, which is a rare combination on keyboard synthesizers.

== Sound generation ==
The Wave has two oscillators, each with six different sound banks. Five of these banks are common to both; these are the three analog waveforms provided (sawtooth, triangular and square), as well as noise generation and FM synthesis (with many different algorithms provided). Oscillator One's unique bank is a wavetable bank, with a sample-playback bank being unique to Oscillator Two (the latter of which is full of Mellotron tapesets, amongst other things).

== Performance control ==
There is an extensive, comprehensive user interface on this keyboard, with plenty of dials and switches at one's fingertips. Shown below is a list of these features.

- Polyphony Selection (Poly/Mono/Legato) with Glide control.
- Routable Vibrato.
- Octave Shifter, Pitch Bend and Modulation Wheel.
- Live Patches (Two Slots).
- Modulation Envelope.
- Two routable LFO's (with five waveforms).
- Oscillator Mixer, Osc 2 Detune and Pitch Shift.
- Variable keyboard tracking.
- Amplitude and Filter Envelopes (both with ADSR configuration).
- Variable (Cut-off and Resonance) filter (with six types of filter).
- Two-band EQ.
- Four effects engines (Chorus, Drive, Reverb and Delay).
