= Clavia =

Swedish manufacturer of synthesizers

Clavia DMI AB
- Company type: Private
- Industry: Synthesizers
- Founded: 1983; 43 years ago in Stockholm, Sweden
- Founders: Hans Nordelius; Mikael Carlsson
- Products: Virtual analog synthesizers; Virtual electromechanical pianos; Stage pianos
- Divisions: ddrum (until 2005)
- Website: nordkeyboards.com

Clavia Digital Musical Instruments (Clavia DMI AB) is a Swedish manufacturer of virtual analog synthesizers, virtual electromechanical pianos and stage pianos, founded in Stockholm, Sweden in 1983 by Hans Nordelius and Mikael Carlsson. Since 1995, Clavia's keyboards have been branded Nord.

== Company history ==
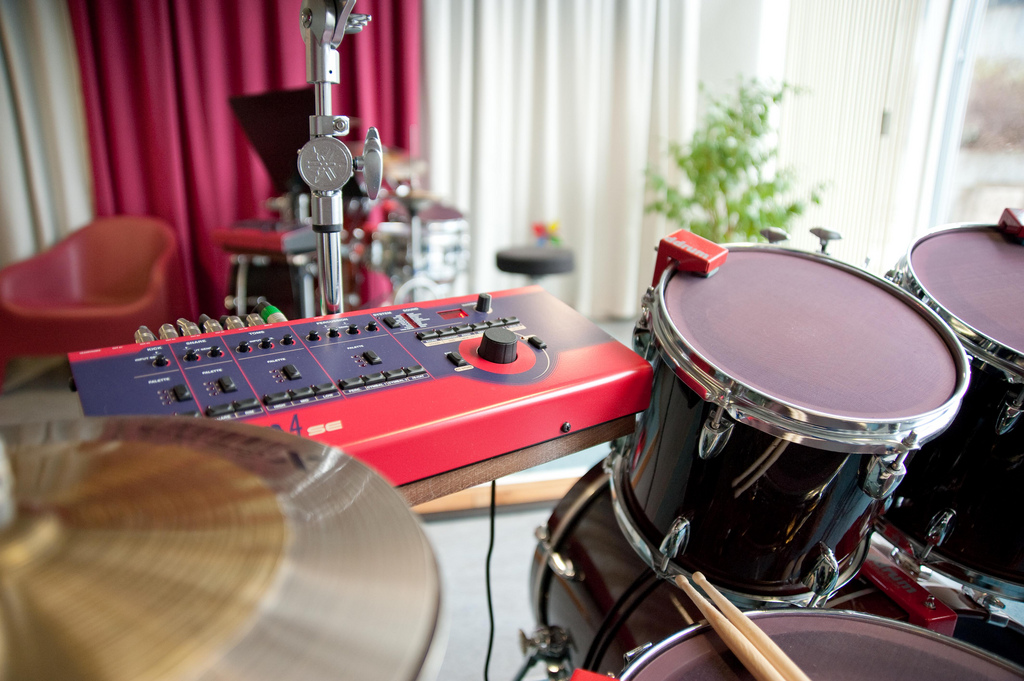
ddrum4 SE

=== Digital drums ===
In 1983, Hans Nordelius and Mikael Carlsson began to work in the basement of a home located in the southern suburbs of Stockholm, creating the world's first dedicated digital drum for the commercial market, called the "Digital Percussion Plate 1". In 1984 an improved version that could play four sounds from an EPROM was released under the "ddrum" name with the now-signature red coloring. The same year a drum system was released with several sound modules in a rack, each with its own EPROM. The pads used to trigger the sounds were unusual for the time, since they used real drum heads, whereas other electronic drum kits of the time used rubber pads. This, together with a separate trigger for the snare drum's rim, made for a more realistic playing experience. The ddrum brand and products were sold in 2005 to their US distributor, Armadillo Enterprises, who continues to manufacture drum products under the name.

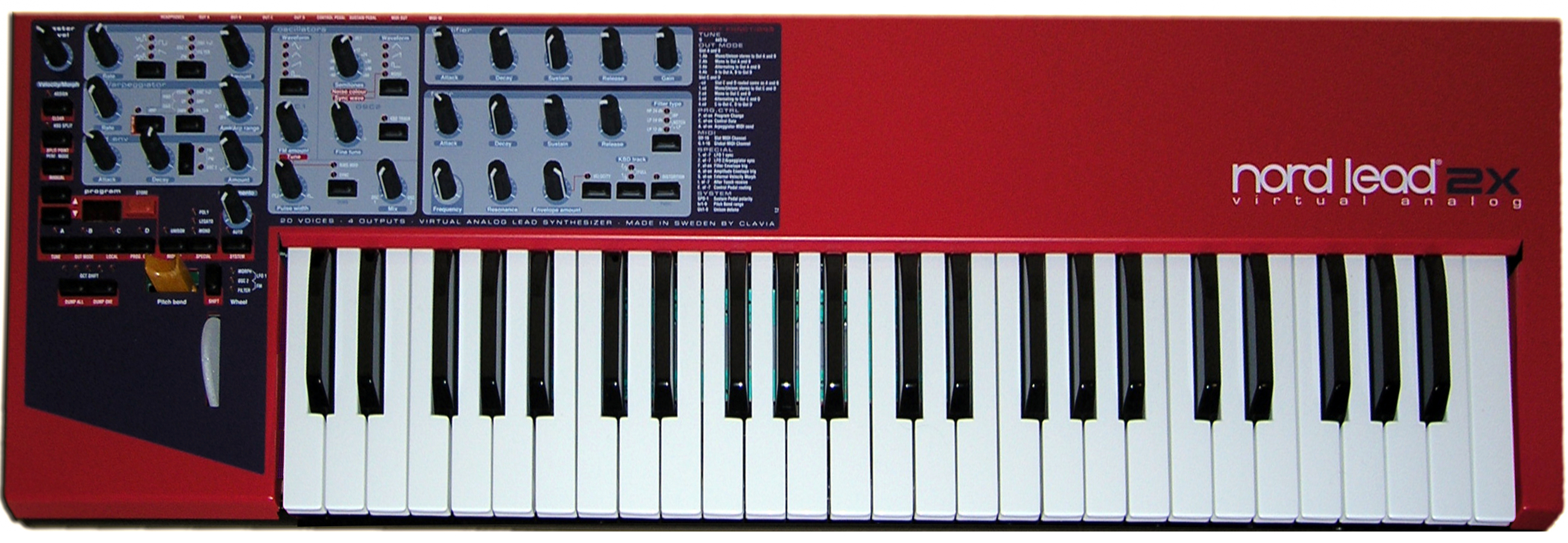
Nord Lead 2x

=== Nord keyboards ===
In 1995, Clavia released the Nord Lead. Called "a magic piece of electronics" by Sound on Sound, it popularized the virtual analog type of synthesis. In 1997 the Nord Lead 2 was released, with many improvements, including increasing polyphony from 4 to 16 notes. The Nord Lead 3 was released in 2001, with a reworked sound engine, better D/A converters and monophonic aftertouch. The most striking aspect of the Nord Lead 3 was that the sound editing knobs had been replaced with infinite rotary knobs, where the value of the parameter was indicated by an LED "collar" around the knob. The rotary knobs, LED collars and keyboard with aftertouch made the Nord Lead 3 an "absolute delight", but because of the higher price, the Nord Lead 2 remained in demand. And as some of the parts of the Nord Lead 3 were getting harder to source, Clavia released an updated version of the Nord Lead 2, called the Nord Lead 2x, with faster processors, better D/A converters and an upgraded polyphony to 20 voices. The Nord Lead 3 was discontinued in 2007, but the Nord Lead 2x remains in production.

In 1997 Clavia released the Nord Modular, a virtual analog modular synthesizer. Called a "landmark in synthesis" by Paul Nagle in Sound On Sound, it allowed the user to build their own virtual analog synthesizer. It too was later upgraded with the 2004 release of the Nord Modular G2, that gave it the same endless rotary knobs as the Nord Lead 3 and a larger keyboard with aftertouch.

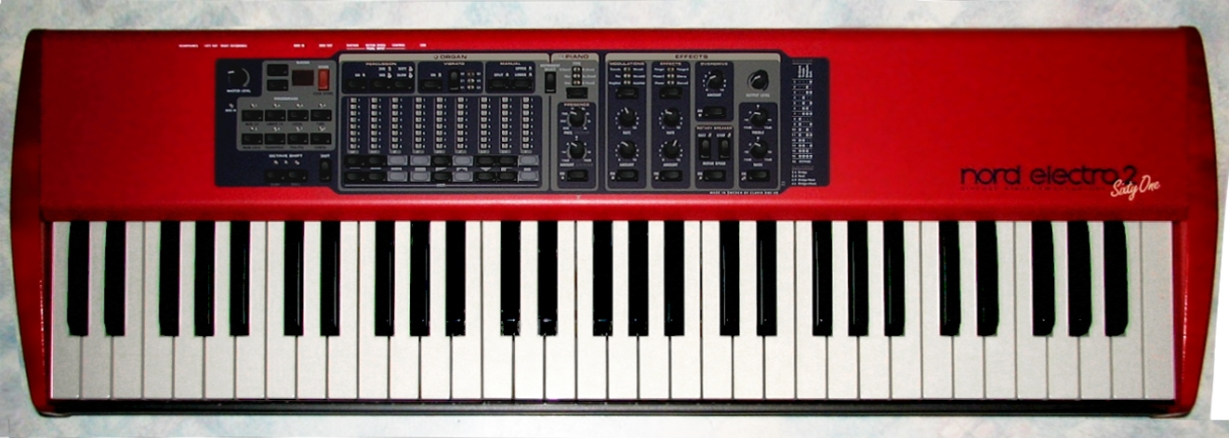
Nord Electro2

In 2001 the Nord Electro was released. It was designed to emulate the classical electromechanical keyboards like the Hammond organ, the Rhodes Stage 73, the Wurlitzer electric piano and the Hohner Clavinet. The pianos are sampled, but the organs are modeled using a "digital simulation".

In 2005, Clavia produced the Nord Stage, combining the organ and piano functions of the Electro with some of the synth functionality of the Lead, while adding other piano functionality and a version with 88 weighted keys.

In October 2007 Clavia released the Nord Wave, which adds sample-player functionality to the virtual analog engine of the Nord Lead series and in March 2012 Clavia released the Nord Drum, a virtual analog drum synthesizer. and the Nord C1 Organ, a dual manual instrument containing the organ section from the Nord Electro 3, to which an emulation of a Baroque pipe organ was added in 2009.

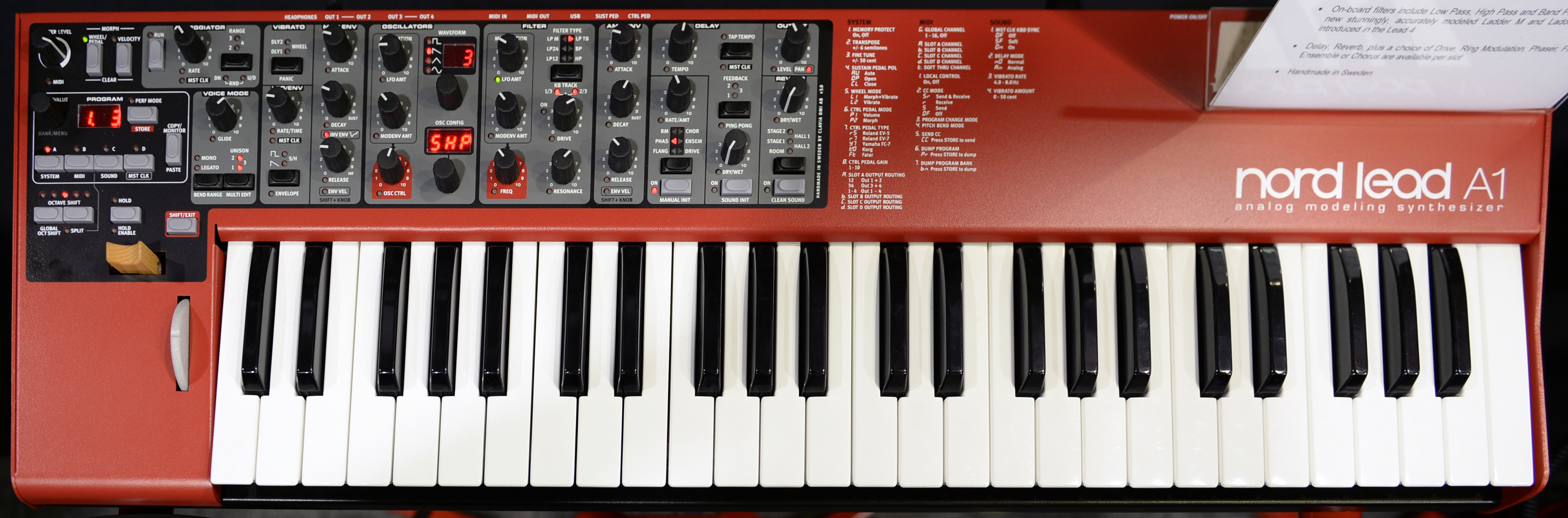
Nord Lead A1

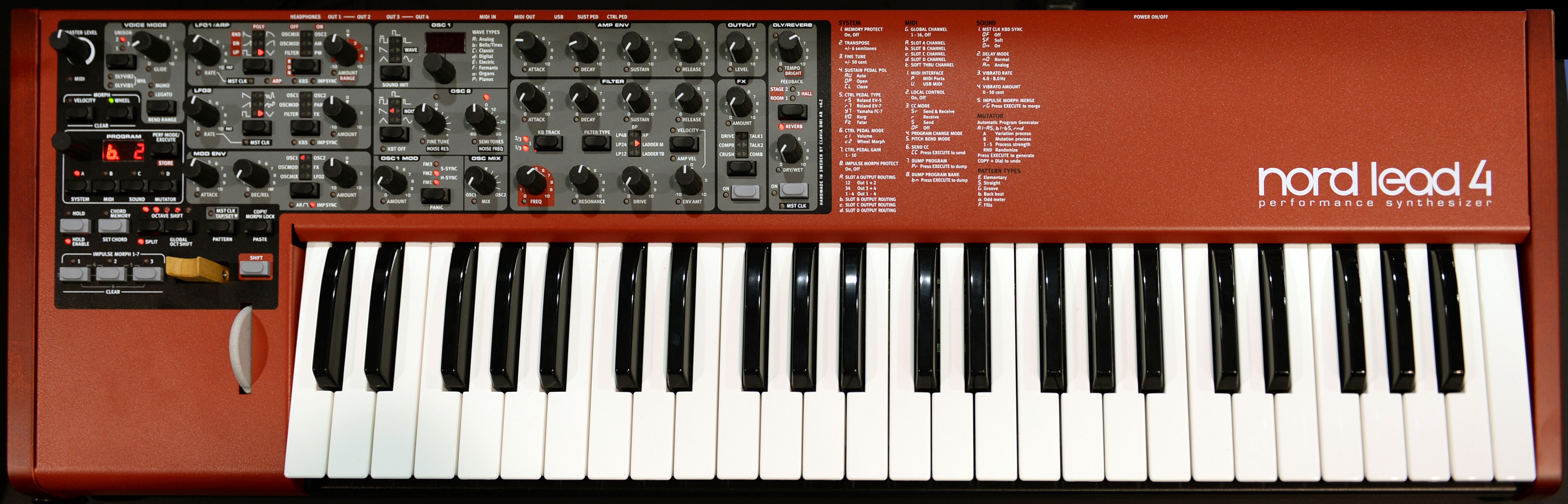
Nord Lead 4

The Nord Piano was released in 2010, which contained the piano section from the Nord Electro 3 with an 88-key hammer-action keyboard.

Clavia has continued to update each of these models, and in 2025 the Nord range included the Nord Stage 4, the Nord Piano 5, the Nord Grand 2, the Nord Electro 6, the Nord Lead A1 and the Nord Wave 2.

== Products ==
- Nord Lead A1 - Performance synthesizer
- Nord Wave 2 - Performance synthesizer
- Nord Electro 6 - Virtual electromechanical keyboard instrument
- Nord Grand 2 - Stage piano
- Nord Piano 5 - Stage piano
- Nord Stage 4 - Stage keyboard
- Nord Piano Monitor - Monitor boxes
- Nord Organ 3 - Dual Manual Virtual Combo Organ
- Nord Pedal Keys 27 - MIDI organ pedalboard
- Nord Drum 3P - Modelling percussion synthesizer
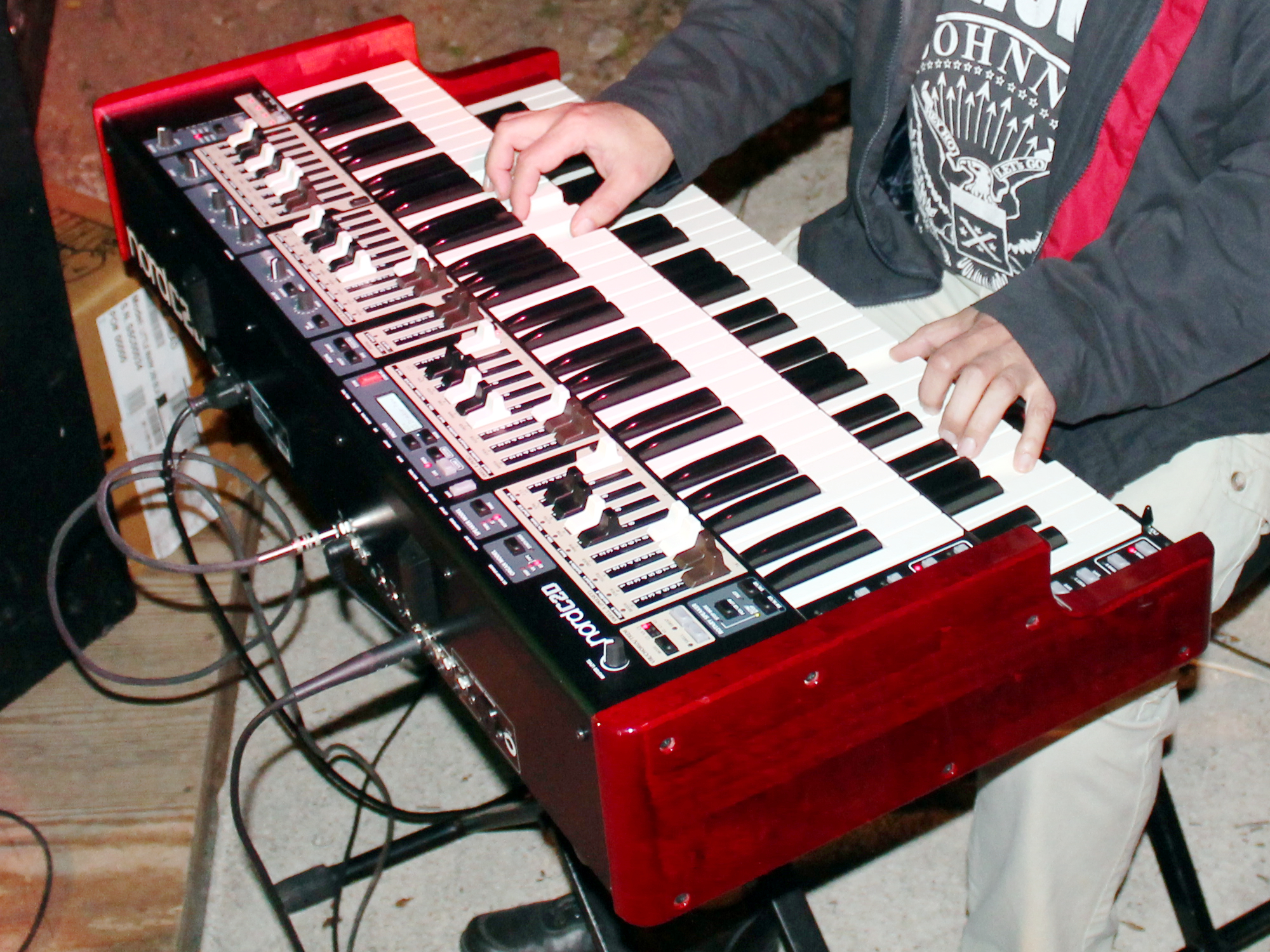
Nord C2D Combo Organ

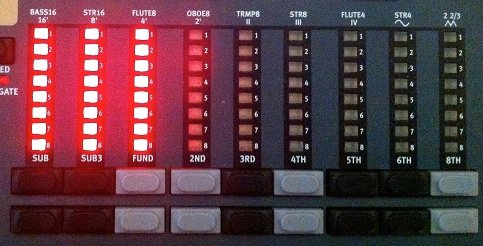
Nord Stage 2 Draw-buttons

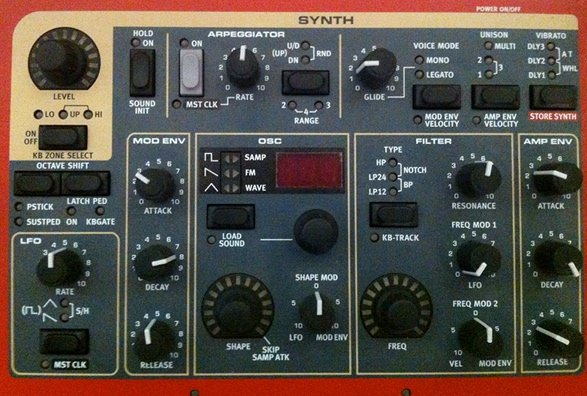
Nord Stage 2 Synth panel

== Discontinued products ==
Discontinued products list:

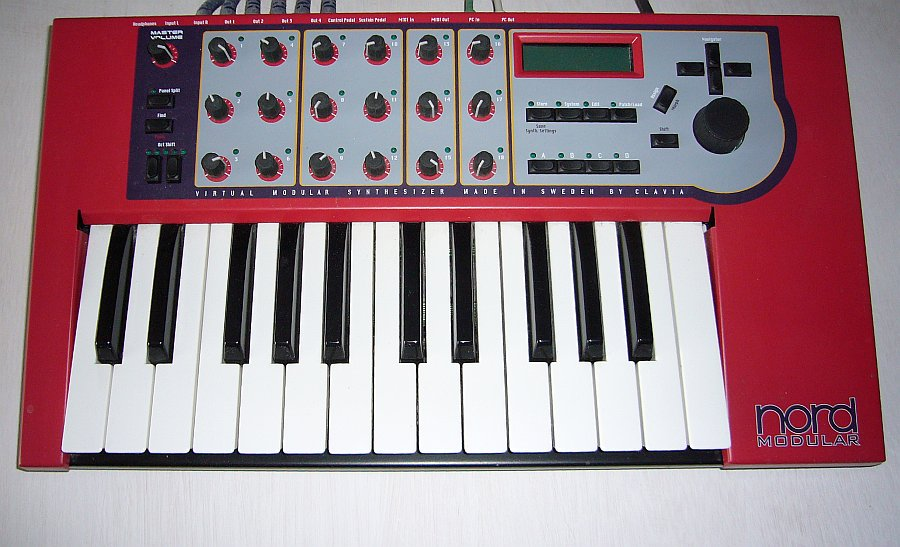
Nord Modular

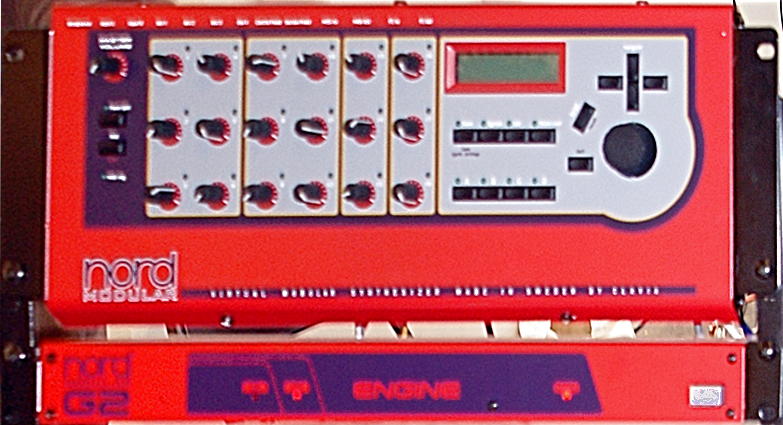
Nord Modular Rack & G2 Engine

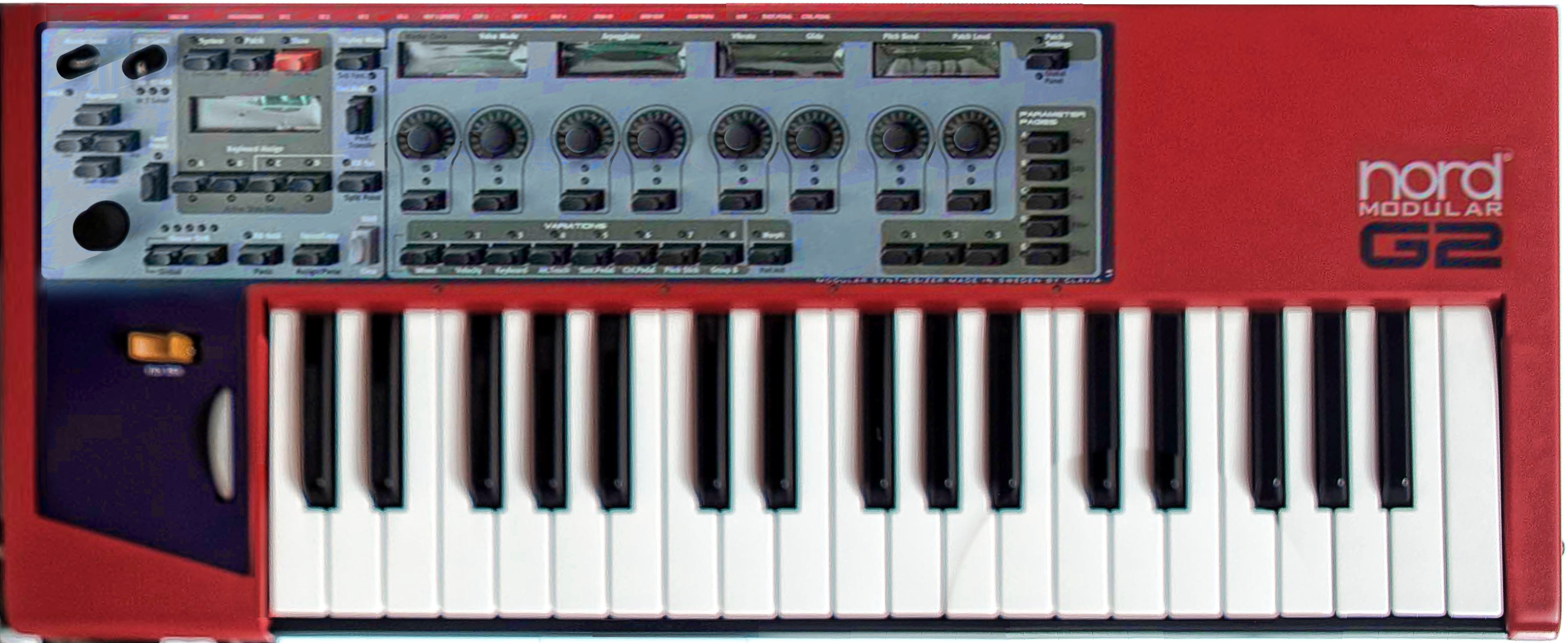
Nord Modular G2

- Ddrum series by Clavia - sold in 2005
- Nord Piano - Stage piano
- Nord Piano 2 - Stage piano
- Nord Piano 3 - Stage piano
- Nord Piano 4 - Stage piano
- Nord Grand - Stage piano
- Nord C1 - Dual Manual Virtual Combo Organ
- Nord C2 - Dual Manual Virtual Combo Organ
- Nord C2D - Dual Manual Virtual Combo Organ
- Nord Electro - Virtual electromechanical keyboard instrument
- Nord Electro Rack - Virtual electromechanical MIDI module
- Nord Electro 2 - Virtual electromechanical keyboard instrument
- Nord Electro Rack 2 - Virtual electromechanical MIDI module
- Nord Electro 3 - Virtual electromechanical keyboard instrument
- Nord Electro 4D / HP - Virtual electromechanical keyboard instrument
- Nord Electro 5D / HP - Virtual electromechanical keyboard instrument
- Nord Wave - Performance Synthesizer & Sampler
- Nord Lead (1995) - Virtual analog synthesizer
- Nord Lead Rack (1995) - Virtual analog synthesizer
- Nord Rack - Virtual analog MIDI module
- Nord Lead 2 (1997) - Virtual analog synthesizer
- Nord Rack 2 - Virtual analog MIDI module
- Nord Lead 2X - Virtual analog synthesizer
- Nord Rack 2X - Virtual analog MIDI module
- Nord Lead 3 - Virtual analog synthesizer
- Nord Rack 3 - Virtual analog MIDI module
- Nord Lead 4 - Performance synthesizer
- Nord Stage - Stage keyboard
- Nord Stage EX - Stage keyboard
- Nord Stage 2 - Stage keyboard
- Nord Stage 2EX - Stage keyboard
- Nord Stage 3 - Stage keyboard
- Nord Modular - Software-based semi-modular synthesizer
- Nord Modular G2 - Software-based semi-modular synthesizer
- Nord Modular G2x - Software-based semi-modular synthesizer
- Nord Micro Modular - Software-based semi-modular synthesizer
- Nord Drum - Modelling percussion synthesizer
- Nord Drum 2 - Modelling percussion synthesizer
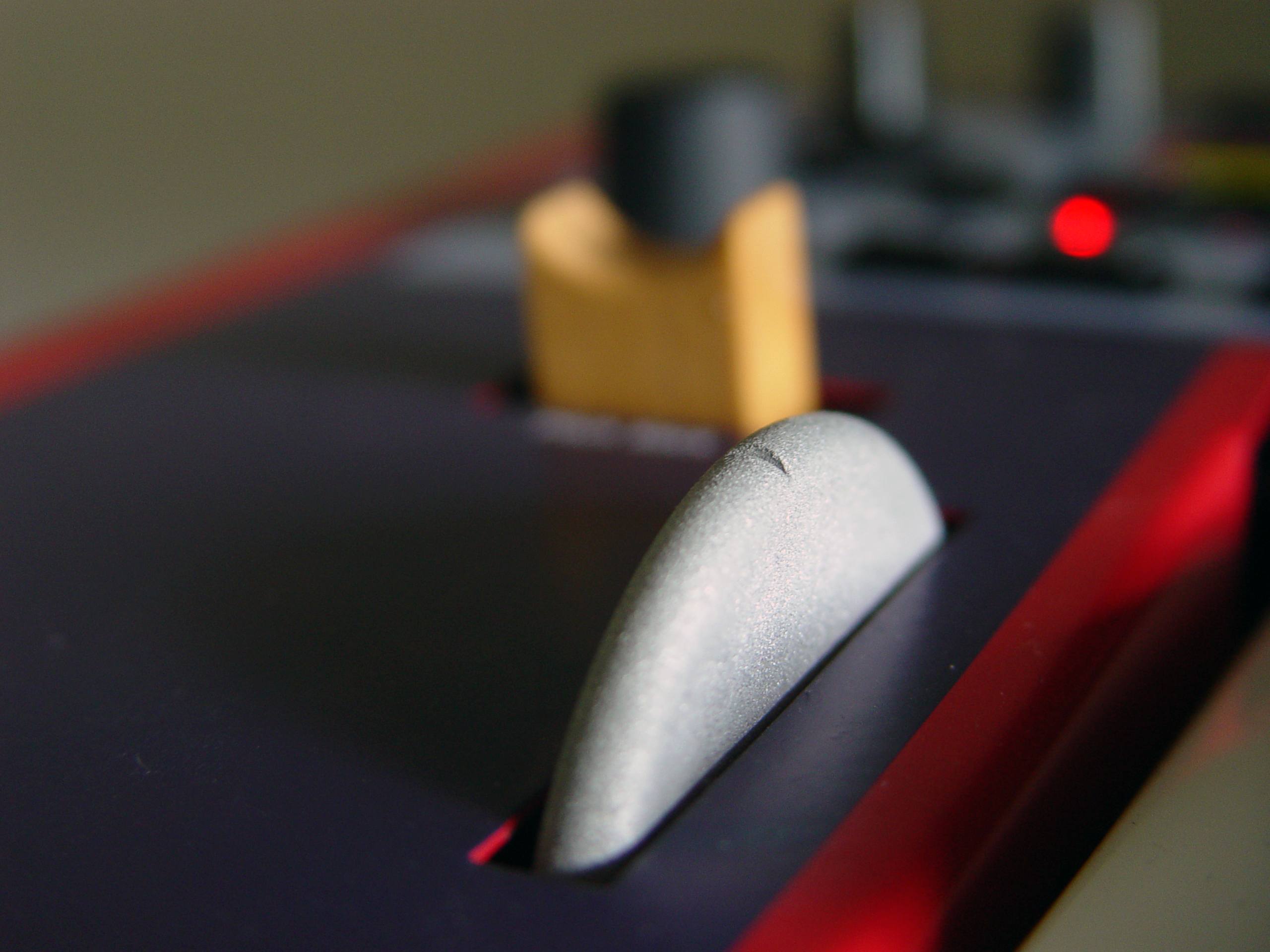
Pitch stick & wheel
(Nord Modular G2)

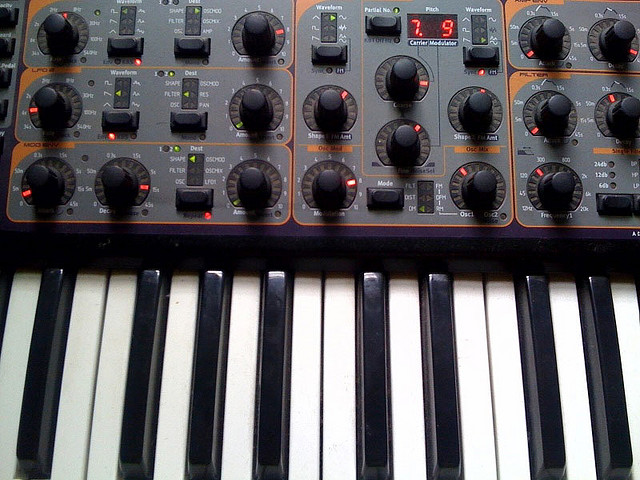
Nord Lead 3

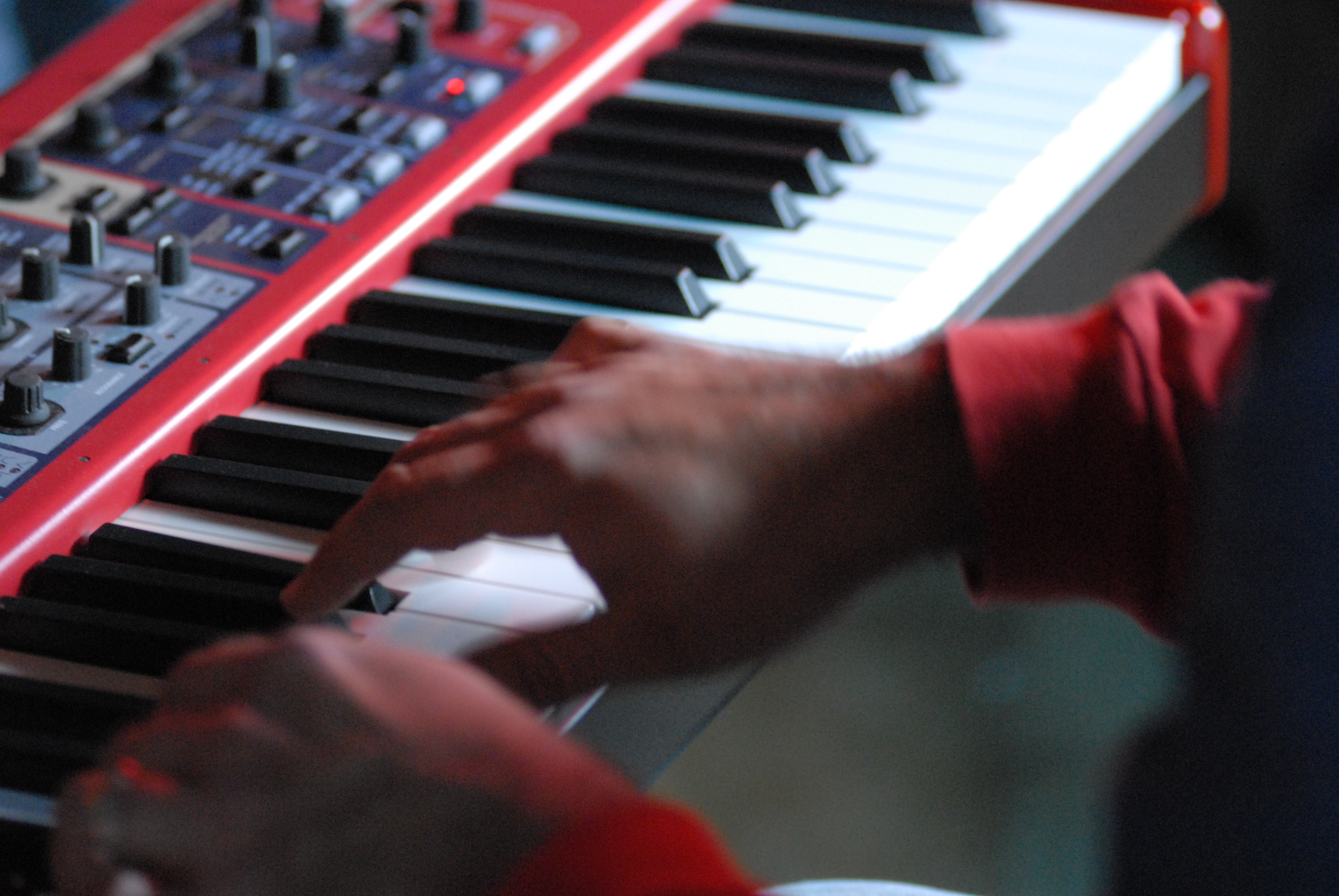
Nord Stage 88

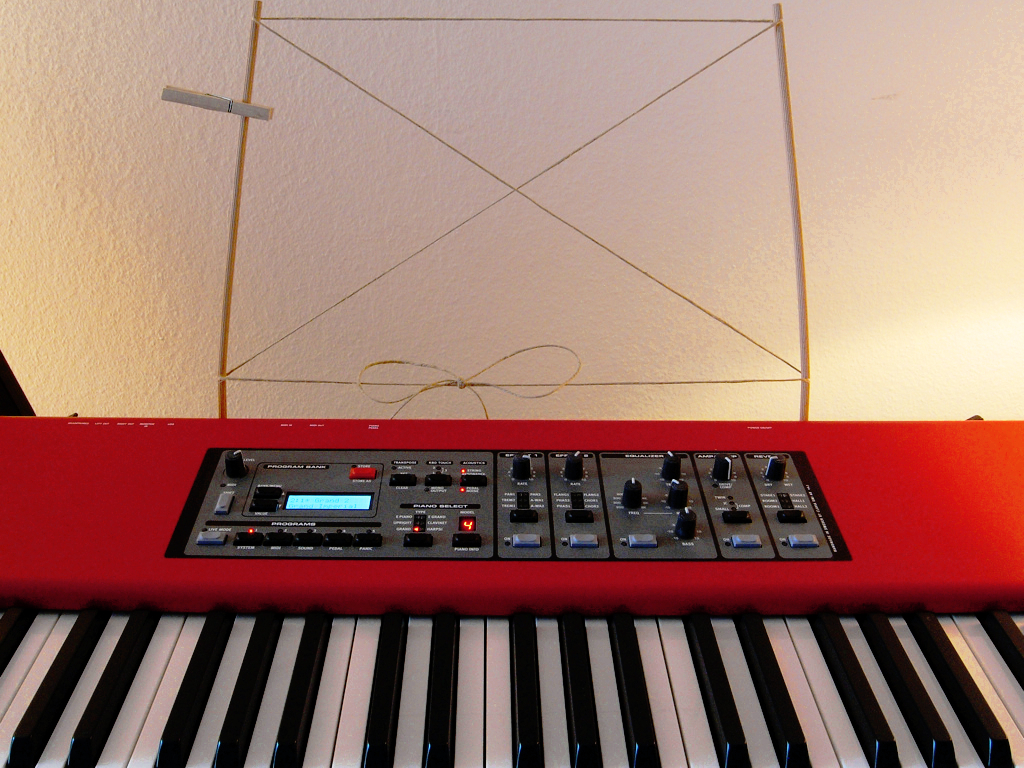
Nord Piano 88
