= Nord Lead =

Line of synthesizers

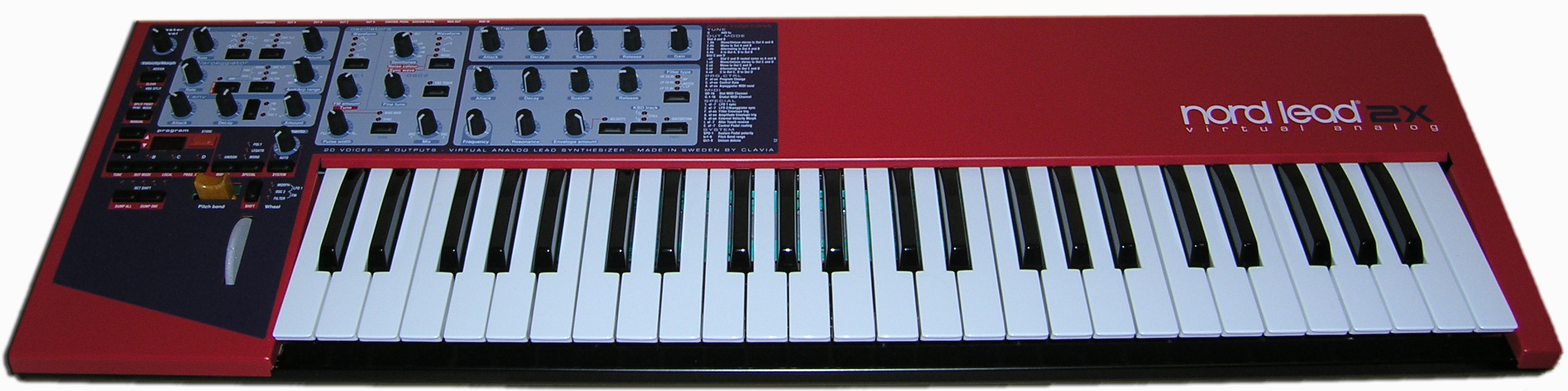
- Nord Lead 2X
- Manufacturer: Clavia
- Dates: 1995 –

Technical specifications
- Polyphony: Nord Lead : 4 (12 expanded); Nord Lead 2 : 16; Nord Lead 2X : 20; Nord Lead 3 : 24; Nord Lead 4 : 20; Nord Lead A1 : 26
- Timbrality: 4
- Oscillator: 2 per voice
- LFO: Triangle, sawtooth, square, random, sample and hold
- Synthesis type: Virtual analog subtractive
- Filter: 1 Digital multi-mode filter
- Attenuator: ADSR envelope generator
- Aftertouch expression: Nord Lead 3 only
- Velocity expression: Yes
- Storage memory: Nord Lead 1/2: 99 patches Nord Lead 2X: 4x99 patches Nord Lead 3: 1024 patches Nord Lead 4: 4x99 patches Nord Lead A1: 8x50 patches

Input/output
- Keyboard: 49 keys
- Left-hand control: Pitch bend, mod wheel
- External control: MIDI in/out

The Nord Lead is a series of virtual analog subtractive synthesizers, manufactured by Clavia.

Released in 1995, the original Nord Lead popularized the term "virtual analog synthesis". The phrase was coined by Clavia at the release of the Nord Lead. This synthesizer is distinctive for its red body, knob-laden surface, and unique pitch-stick and modulation wheel. The model received several updates, including the Nord Lead 2, Nord Lead 3, and Nord Lead 2X.

== Models ==
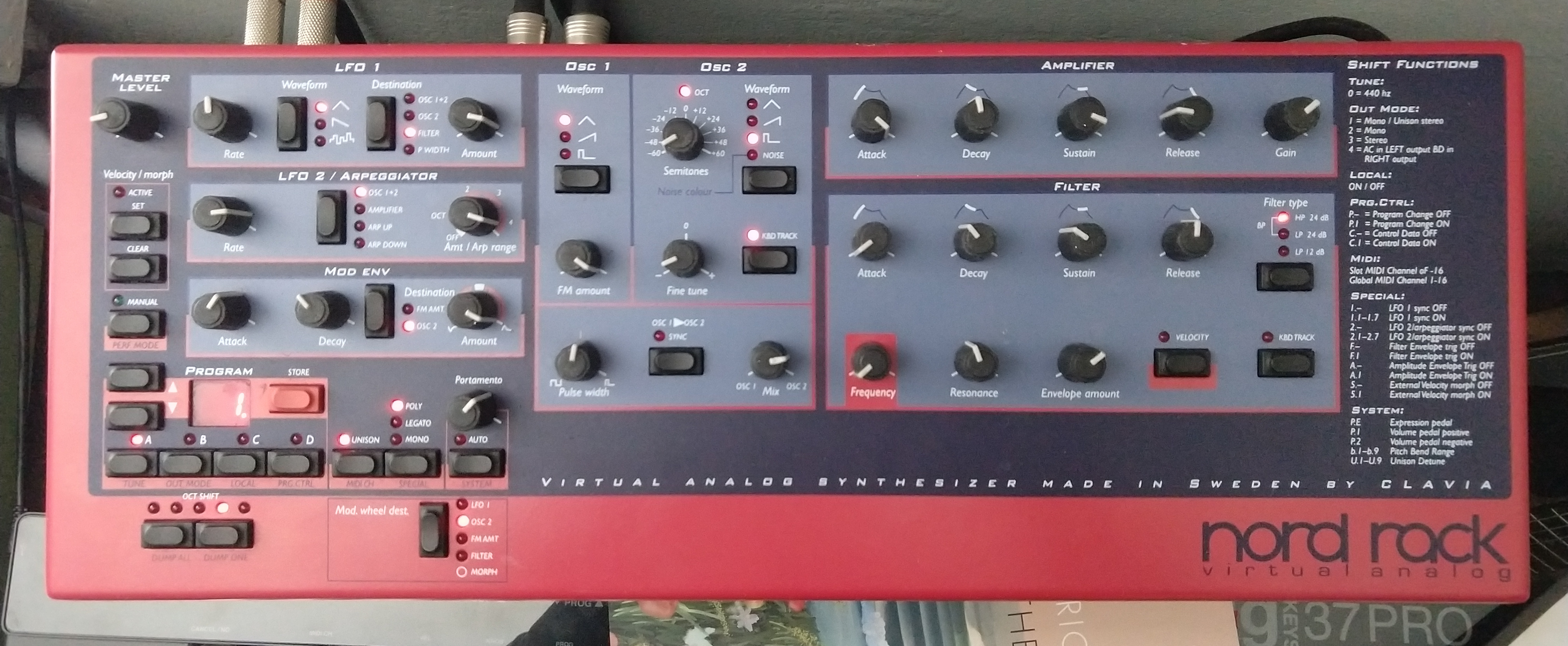
Nord Rack (rack version of Nord Lead)

=== Nord Lead ===
The first Nord Lead was released in 1995 to positive reviews. It was created with the help of Peter Jubel, who also co-founded Propellerhead Software. Compared to synthesizers being constructed via analog components, the Nord Lead uses digital signal processors (DSPs) programmed to emulate both Subtractive and analogue FM synthesis (cross-modulation) to reproduce the warmth and richness of a traditional analog sound. The Nord Lead was also unusual for its time in being "covered in knobs", which gave the player a direct access to all sound parameters without having to walk through editing menus.

The Nord Lead featured four notes of polyphony. A later hardware upgrade increased the polyphony to twelve voices. The expansion also added PCMCIA card storage of patches and a drum map feature.

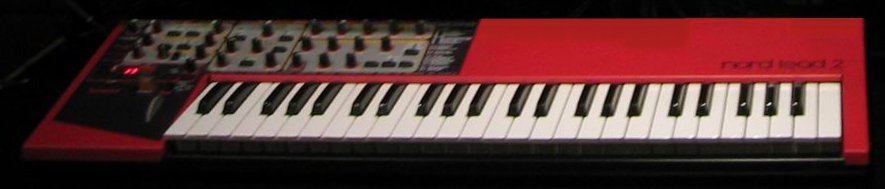
Nord Lead 2

=== Nord Lead 2 ===
The Clavia Nord Lead 2 was launched in 1997, two years after the production of the original Nord Lead. It updated the polyphony from four to 16 voices. Also added were a ring modulator, OSC 1 sync-able with the white noise generator, Sine waveform added for OSC 1, increased LFO and arpeggiator waveforms and patterns, filter distortion and 4 individual outputs. Patch storage was also increased. A PCMCIA storage slot was also added.

=== Nord Lead 3 ===
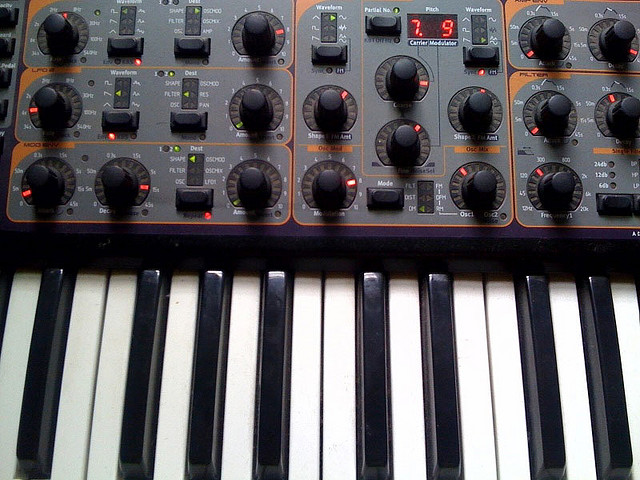
Nord Lead 3

The Nord Lead 3 was a more advanced version introduced in 2001, with many new features like 4 operator FM Synthesis (Sinus Modulation), and an arpeggiator. The most visible new feature was replacing all the control knobs with endless rotary knobs surrounded by a lighted indicating collar to show the current setting. The Nord Lead 3 was however much more expensive than the Nord Lead 2, so the Nord Lead 2 and later Nord Lead 2X was sold in parallel to this flagship product. The Nord Lead 3 was discontinued in 2007, leaving the Nord Lead 2X the only remaining product in the Nord Lead series.

=== Nord Lead 2X ===
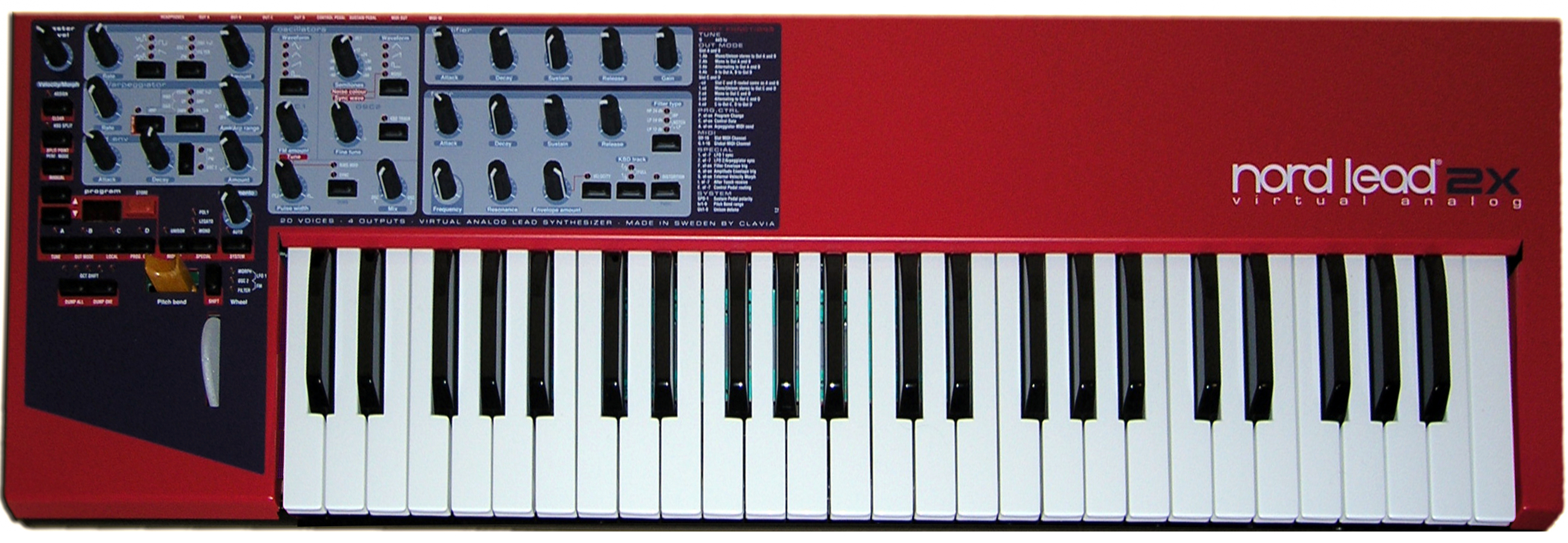
Nord Lead 2X

In 2003 Clavia introduced the 2X, a refresh of the Nord Lead 2. It included increased polyphony (20 voice), high-resolution 24-bit 96 kHz DACs, and vastly expanded patch memory. The PCMCIA patch storage was removed. The 2X retains the synthesis engine of its predecessor and consequently its sound characteristics.

==== Nord Lead 2X Anniversary Edition ====
In 2008, Clavia released a special limited edition of the Lead 2X with inverted key colors (black keys and white sharps/flats) and special logos to commemorate the 25-year history of the Clavia company. Each unit (of only 300) came with an individually numbered certificate.

=== Nord Lead 4 ===
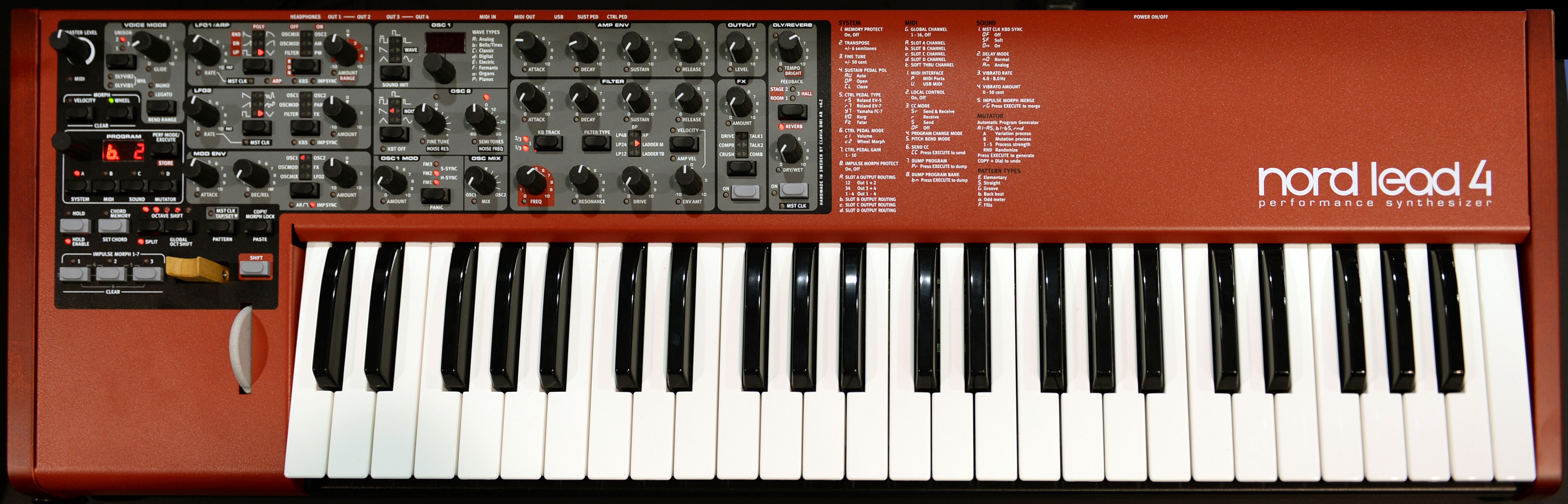
Nord Lead 4

In 2013 Clavia announced the Nord Lead 4 at the annual Musikmesse show in Germany. The new variant boasts an updated sound engine, new filter sections and a "True Voice Unison" mode which can support up to 4 oscillators simultaneously. Furthermore, similar to the Nord Wave, the Lead 4 has a dedicated FX section featuring reverb, delay, crush and distortion. The ability to quickly edit sounds whilst performing live is made possible as a result of the new "variation" controls in which the user can map up to 7 control parameters per program. Also similar to the Nord Wave, the Lead 4 supports MIDI I/O over USB 2.0.

=== Nord Lead A1 ===
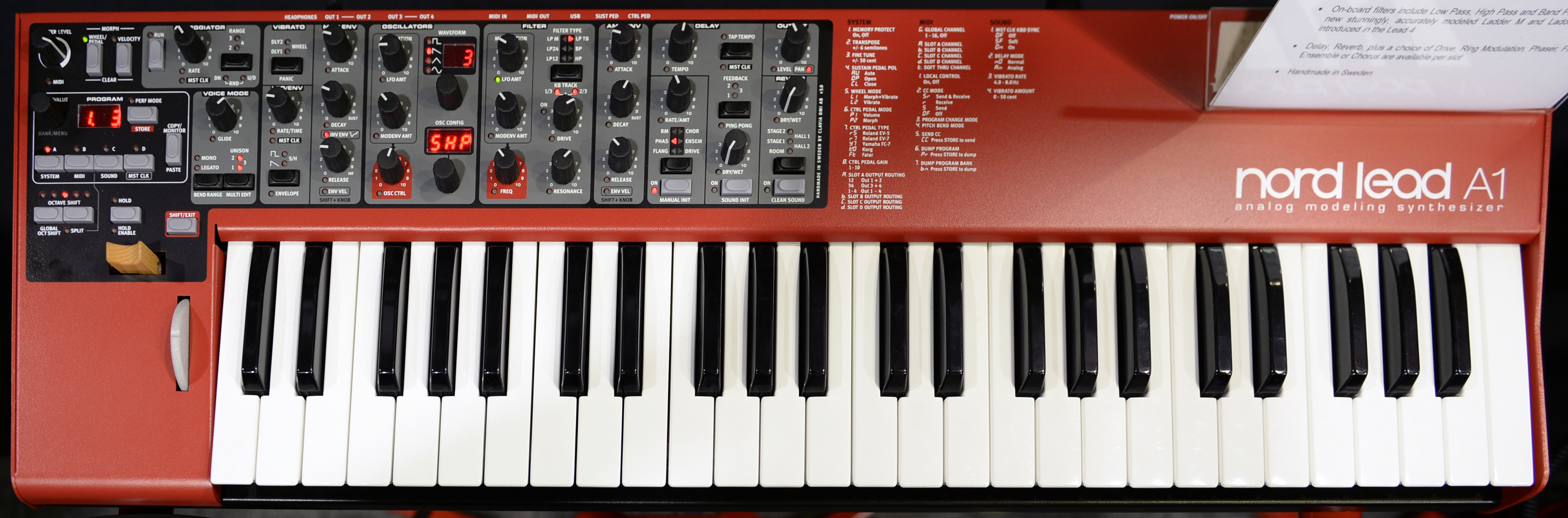
Nord Lead A1

At the 2014 NAMM Show, Clavia announced the Nord Lead A1. The model attempts to make the Nord Lead line accessible to a wider user base, with a new oscillator interface and numerous enhancements intended to facilitate quick and creative sound design.

== See also ==
- Official website of Clavia
- Synth1
