= Nord Electro =

Series of electronic music keyboards

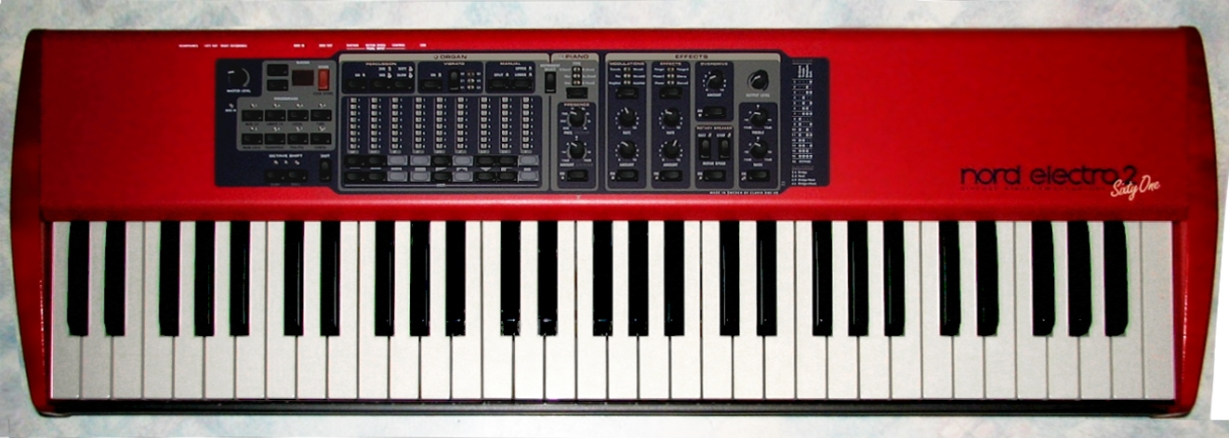
- A Nord Electro 2 with 61 keys
- Manufacturer: Clavia
- Dates: 2001–2002 (Nord Electro); 2002–2009 (Nord Electro 2); 2009–2013 (Nord Electro 3); 2011–2013 (Nord Electro 3 HP); 2012–2015 (Nord Electro 4D and 4 HP); 2015-2018 (Nord Electro 5 and 5D); 2018-present (Nord Electro 6D and 6 HP)

Technical specifications
- Timbrality: 1
- Synthesis type: Sample-based synthesis, Physical modeling synthesis
- Aftertouch expression: No
- Velocity expression: Yes
- Storage memory: 64 programs
- Effects: 6 modulations, 6 effects, overdrive, rotary speaker, EQ

Input/output
- Keyboard: 61-key, 73-key semi-weighted and 73-key hammer action portable
- External control: Sustain pedal, control / swell, rotary speed

The Nord Electro is a series of electronic keyboards, developed in Sweden by Clavia, that digitally emulate electro-mechanical keyboards, such as electric pianos and electronic organs, while being much more portable.

== Features ==
The original Nord Electro has two sections. One was a sample-player intended for electric pianos, although samples of acoustic grand and upright pianos are also available. The sample libraries are exchangeable, and Clavia has made several samples libraries available for free for Nord Electro owners. The second section is a digital emulation of electronic organs. This is not sample based, but instead generated by the digital modelling of several types of organs. Unlike many other keyboards that feature tonewheel organ emulation, the drawbars on some models of the Nord Electro are represented by LED bar graphs and up/down buttons instead of the traditional mechanical drawbars. The Electro 3 added a sample player which offered the ability to play a wider range of sounds, notably including those from the Mellotron and Chamberlin libraries.

There is an effect section that emulates popular "stomp box" effect pedals from the '70s and amplifiers including the Leslie rotary speaker cabinet. These can be applied to piano, organ or samples. Reverb and Delay effects are also available. As with other Clavia products, it is distinctive for its red color. Unlike the Clavia Nord Stage, earlier models could only play one instrument at a time, although a second keyboard could be attached via MIDI as an additional organ manual. The Electro 5 allows for a maximum of two sound sources to be used simultaneously in layered or split-keyboard configuration while the Electro 6 allows for a maximum of three sound sources (organ+piano+sample).

== Models ==
The original Nord Electro was released in 2001. It contained emulations of a Hammond B3 as well as samples of a Rhodes Stage 73, a Wurlitzer electric piano, a Hohner Clavinet and an acoustic grand piano. The Electro was released in 61- and 73-key versions as well as a rack version, which featured all the same controls as the keyboard versions.

In 2002, the Nord Electro 2 was released. It contained new and updated software, but the electronics were identical to the original Electro, which permitted the original Electro to be updated to Electro 2 functionality through a software update. Like the original Electro, the Electro 2 was also released in 61- and 73-key versions as well as a rack version.

In 2009, the Nord Electro 3 was released. It expanded the functionality of the Nord Electro 2 with Farfisa and Vox organ emulations as well as improved B3 emulation and more effects. It also includes samples from the Mellotron library and support for the entire Nord Sample Library. It was initially released only in 61- and 73-key semi-weighted versions.

In 2011, the Nord Electro 3 HP (Hammer Portable) was released, which replaces the organ-style semi-weighted "waterfall" keys of the original models with a light-weight 73-key hammer-action keyboard.

In 2012, the Nord Electro 4D was released, which replaces the digital organ drawbars of prior models with physical drawbar sliders and has updated Hammond B3 emulation. It has a 61-key organ-style semi-weighted "waterfall" keyboard. Later in 2012, the Nord Electro 4 HP and 4 SW were released. They have the same features as the Electro 4D, except with the digital drawbars of the Electro 3 and earlier, increased sample memory, and 73-key keyboards like the Electro 3 HP and SW.

On January 16, 2015, Clavia announced the Nord Electro 5 on their website: two 5D models, one with 61 (5D 61) and the other with 73 keys (5D 73), and a 5 HP with 73 hammer-action keys.

On January 19, 2018, Clavia announced the Nord Electro 6. As with the previous generation, there are two models with physical drawbars and waterfall keys (Electro 6D 61 and 6D 73) and one with a 73-note hammer-action keybed (Electro 6 HP). This model has for the first time multi-timbrality (3 parts) and a "Dual Organ" mode to allow the player quick access to split keyboard setups to emulate a dual-manual organ on a single-manual instrument.

Feature History
Version	Piano sample memory	Synth sample memory	Year
Electro	—	—	2001
Electro 2	—	—	2002
Electro 3	256 MB	68 MB	2009
Electro 4	185 MB (D) / 380 MB (HP)	68 MB / 128 MB	2012
Electro 5	1 GB	256 MB	2015
Electro 6	1 GB	512 MB	2018
