= Dia Frampton =

American musician (born 1987)

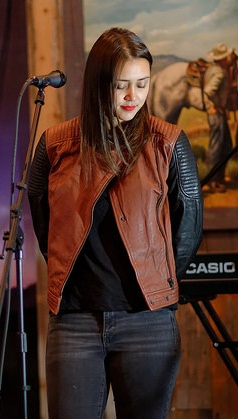
- Frampton performing at Tinhorn Flats in Hollywood, California in May 2015

Background information
- Born: October 2, 1987 (age 38); Draper, Utah, U.S.
- Genres: Folk pop
- Occupations: Musician; singer; songwriter
- Instruments: Vocals; piano; guitar
- Years active: 2004–present
- Labels: Universal Republic; Nettwerk; Pure Noise
- Website: www.diamusic.net

Dia Frampton (born October 2, 1987) is an American musician, singer and songwriter. Frampton is the lead singer of the band Meg & Dia, was the runner-up in the inaugural season of The Voice, and is also known for her presence and collaborations in the EDM world, having worked with DJs such as Illenium and Kaskade among many others.

== Life and career ==
=== Early life ===
Dia Frampton grew up in St. George, Utah and Draper, Utah. She attended Dixie High School in St. George, Utah and Shadow Ridge High School in Las Vegas, Nevada. Dia graduated early by homeschooling her senior year, and at the same time attending public school. Dia then moved to Salt Lake City with her sister to further their music career. She cites Modest Mouse, Tom Petty and the Heartbreakers, Joni Mitchell, The Avett Brothers, Rocky Votolato, Ben Folds, Etta James, Death Cab for Cutie, The Cranberries, and Cursive as influences. During live performances, Frampton plays percussion instruments, such as the cowbell and tambourine, and occasionally a Casio Privia keyboard. She almost always performs without shoes on. She also does not like to eat anything within two hours of performing. Her father is an American of English and Dutch ancestry and her mother is Korean, originally from Seoul.

Frampton often recorded a "song diary," an impromptu recorded song, on her MySpace page. She explained, "It was something very raw, and to be honest, something that I was slightly embarrassed to put up because of the quality but I did anyways, for any of our listeners who would care to hear something not hot off the production belt, but something more organic and 'home made.' It made me feel better to share my feelings with people who could connect, and I think that is what happened with many."

=== 2005–2011: Meg and Dia ===
Along with her sister Meg Frampton, Dia was part of the five-piece alternative rock band Meg & Dia. The band released their debut album "Our Home is Gone" in 2005 (at the time the band was just a two-piece) and later released Something Real under Doghouse Records, which peaked at No. 12 on the Billboard Heatseekers Chart. The band found success by promoting their music on MySpace, leading them to become the official MySpace band on the Warped Tour 2006.

Meg & Dia's profile in the rock scene continued to grow, leading to continued appearances at the Warped Tour, touring with bands such as Angels & Airwaves and a record deal with Warner Bros. Records. This deal yielded the pop-rock leaning Here, Here and Here, which charted at No. 103 on the Billboard 200.

In 2010, Warner Bros. dropped the band, reverting the group back to their indie status. Nonetheless, the band released their fourth studio album, Cocoon, which was received positively by fans and critics, but failed to perform well commercially, leading to Dia's manager, Mike Kaminsky, suggesting her audition for The Voice.

=== 2011: The Voice ===
Dia Frampton was a contestant (and eventual runner-up) on the first season of The Voice on NBC, introduced as a children's story author. Frampton stated that she had originally joined the show only with the intention of promoting Cocoon and had not expected that she would make it that far in the competition. She was selected to be on the team of coach Blake Shelton, who stated, "when I heard your voice, I started to smile." Frampton advanced through the show's quarter-finals and semi-finales after renditions of "Heartless" and "Losing My Religion". Notably, the aforementioned singles were the highest charting iTunes digital songs by any contestant on The Voice during its respective voting eligibility period, with "Inventing Shadows" topping the charts at No. 1. Following the season finale on June 29, 2011, "Inventing Shadows" debuted at No. 20 on the Billboard Hot 100 with 137,000 downloads sold. As of July 7, 2011, Frampton's The Voice digital releases have sold 480,000 downloads.

Frampton subsequently won the title of Entertainment Weekly's 2011 'Favourite Reality Show Personality' over Michael Stagliano from the second season of Bachelor Pad.

==== Performances on The Voice ====
Stage	Song	Original Artist	Date	Order	Result
Blind Audition	"Bubbly"	Colbie Caillat	May 3, 2011	2.16	Cee Lo Green and Blake Shelton turned Joined Team Blake
Battle Rounds	"You Can't Hurry Love" (vs. Serabee)	The Supremes	May 24, 2011	5.2	Saved by Coach
Quarter-finals	"Heartless"	Kanye West	June 7, 2011	7.4	Saved by Public Vote
Semi-finals	"Losing My Religion"	R.E.M.	June 21, 2011	9.3	Saved by Coach and Public Vote (106 Points)
Finals	"I Won't Back Down" (with Blake Shelton)	Tom Petty	June 28, 2011	11.2	Runner-up
Finals	"Inventing Shadows" (Original)	Dia Frampton	June 28, 2011	11.5	Runner-up

=== 2011–2013: Red and embarking on solo career ===
"The Broken Ones" (2011)
A 21-second sample of Frampton's debut single, "The Broken Ones".

Frampton's debut single, "The Broken Ones", was released on November 15, 2011, and her solo album, Red, was released on December 6. Frampton co-wrote every song on the album. Notable co-written songs include "Billy the Kid", which she wrote with Mark Foster and Isom Innis, lead singer and keyboard player for Foster the People respectively, "Hearts out to Dry", which she wrote with her sister, Meg, and "Bullseye", which she wrote with Isabella Summers, the keyboard player for Florence and the Machine.

She was the opening act for her coach, Blake Shelton, on his Well Lit & Amplified tour. Shelton insisted that she had earned her spot on his tour and he was not doing her any favors. She later was a supporting act for The Fray in their sold out US tour in the Midwest and the West Coast from April to May 2011. Her own solo US tour took place from February to July 2012, with Canadian singer-songwriter Andrew Allen as her opening act.

Meg & Dia, whose members had joined Dia on the Blake Shelton tour, confirmed their disbandment in October 2012.

She covered the Korean song, "Lonely" by 2NE1, as an acoustic ballad in English for Allkpop.com to promote her later concert in Seoul, Korea. On December 30, 2012, she sang a solo of "Heartless" and performed "We Are The Champions" with the final 8 of The Voice of Vietnam. In January 2013, Dia held a small tour, staging concerts across Southeast Asian countries Vietnam, Singapore, Philippines, Thailand, Malaysia and Indonesia. She also collaborated with Singto Numchok on his singles "Gift" and "Coffee Mate" in Thailand.

=== 2013–2015: Archis and new EP ===
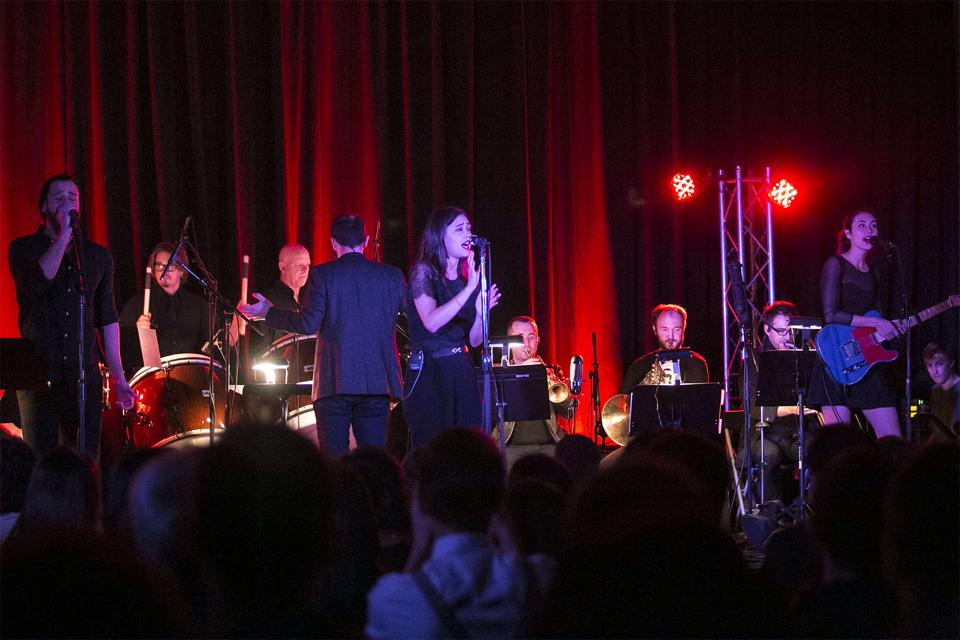
Archis EP Release Show, February 2015

Frampton was featured on "Heart On the Floor", which is a track on The Summer Set's new album, Legendary. The album was released on April 16, 2013. She was also featured on Never Shout Never's Christmas EP, singing "Under the Mistletoe" and on The Crystal Method's new single "Over It", which was featured on their self-titled album on January 14, 2014. As of January, Dia was an opening act for the James Blunt Moon Landing Tour. On April 29, Lindsey Stirling released her album Shatter Me on which Dia collaborated on the songs "We Are Giants" and "Shatter Me". She was also featured in the single "Stay" by Australian DJ tyDi which was released on April 8.

In June, it was announced that after the release of "Red," Frampton had been dropped from Universal Republic. It was also announced that her new album would be an EP, and not a solo album but under the name of her new band, Archis. Two singles were released on this EP, "Blood" and "I Need You". The music video for "Blood" was released on June 2. In August, Frampton announced that Archis had been signed to a new label, and that the EP would be released in January 2015. The EP was produced by her frequent collaborator Joseph Trapanese.

On March 17, Interscope Records released Insurgent: Original Motion Picture Soundtrack. The song "Holes In the Sky" was written by Anthony Gonzalez and Dia Frampton and is performed by M83 and Haim.

=== 2015–2018: Bruises ===
After the release of Archis' EP, the band began working on a full-length LP, to be released in early 2016. However, after releasing a personal essay in August 2016 it was revealed that the LP would be released under her own name and would be titled Bruises. Frampton also revealed that the LP would be produced by Dan Heath. On October 5, 2016, she premiered the lead single off the LP, titled "Golden Years". The single was released on October 7, as part of an EP with the same name, serving as a preview for the LP which was released on March 3, 2017. To coincide with the pre-order of "Bruises" becoming available, Frampton released another single, "Gold & Silver". After the album's release, Frampton released music videos for the tracks "Don't Look Back", "Dead Man" and "Crave"; the latter two being given official single treatment. Throughout 2017 and 2018, Frampton continued to release music in the form of collaborations and guest appearances with other artists. It included Jason Ross, Witt Lowry, Illenium, Kaskade, tyDi, Dabin and Christopher Tin. Frampton has also pursued acting, appearing in Criminal Minds and several short films. In December 2017, Frampton released Yule Tunes as an EP, consisting of 3 cover songs and one original Christmas song – "The Nice List".

=== 2019–present: Meg & Dia reunion ===
On April 1, 2019, it was announced that Meg & Dia were to reunite for select dates of the 2019 Warped Tour. On July 26, the group (now a duo, with former guitarist Gimenez returning as a touring member) surprise-released their fifth studio album "happysad" through Pure Noise Records and released music videos for tracks "American Spirit" and "Teenagers". The group also embarked on the Happysad Tour in support of the record. The group also released a Christmas single, "December, Darling" on November 1 – with the full length December, Darling LP arriving on the 15th.

The group supported Amber Liu on her 24-date North American Tour X in January and February 2020. On 10 January 2025, Frampton released stand-alone single, "Long Way Down".

== Film ==
In 2020, Frampton starred as the lead in the musical holiday romance film I Hate New Year's, with Ashley Argota as her co-lead and Candis Cayne. In 2021, Frampton starred in the holiday romance film Christmas at the Ranch with Amanda Righetti, Lindsay Wagner, Laur Allen and Archie Kao playing the character Lauren.She also starred as Becca in Christmas With Love in 2022 alongside Andi René Christensen.

== Discography ==
=== Albums ===
Title	Album details	Peak chart positions		
Title	Album details	US	US Heat	US Independent
Red	Released: December 6, 2011; Label: Universal Republic; Format: CD, digital download	106	1	—
Bruises	Released: March 3, 2017; Label: Nettwerk; Format: CD, digital download	—	14	35

=== Extended plays ===
Title	Album details
Bruises Raw	Released: July 8, 2017; Label: Nettwerk; Format: digital download
Yule Tunes	Released: November 4, 2017; Label: Nettwerk; Format: digital download

=== Singles As A Lead Singer ===
Year	Single	Peak positions		Album
Year	Single	US	CAN	Album
2011	"Heartless"	57	64	Non-album releases by The Voice
2011	"Losing My Religion"	54	52	Non-album releases by The Voice
2011	"Inventing Shadows"	20	26	Non-album releases by The Voice
2011	"I Won't Back Down" (with Blake Shelton)	57	67	Non-album releases by The Voice
2011	"The Broken Ones"	—	—	Red
2012	"Don't Kick the Chair"	—	—	Red
2016	"Golden Years"	—	—	Bruises
2016	"Gold and Silver"	—	—	Bruises
2017	"Crave"	—	—	Bruises
2017	"Dead Man"	—	—	Bruises
2020	"1000 Faces" (with Jason Ross)	—	—	1000 Faces
2021	"Spark" (with Blanke)	—	—	Non-album single
"—" denotes a recording that did not chart or was not released.

=== As A Songwriter Or A Featured Artist ===
Year	Artist	Label	Song(s)	Album	Credit Type
2014	The Crystal Method	Tiny e Records	"Over It"	The Crystal Method	co-writer, featured vocal
2014	tyDi	Robbins Entertainment	"Stay"	N/A	co-writer, featured vocal
2014	Lindsey Stirling	Decca	"We Are Giants" "Shatter Me"	Shatter Me	co-writer, featured vocal
2014	Watsky	Steel Wool	"Sarajevo"	All You Can Do	featured vocal
2015	M83 feat. HAIM	Interscope	"Holes In The Sky"	Insurgent (Original Motion Picture Soundtrack)	co-writer
2015	Tyler Lyle	Independent	"Start of a Love Song"	The Native Genius of Desert Plants	featured vocal
2017	Borgeous, tyDi	Geousus Records/Armada Music	"Over The Edge"	N/A	co-writer, featured vocal
2017	Illenium	Seeking Blue	"Needed You"	Awake	co-writer, featured vocal
2017	Kaskade	Arkade/Sony	"This Christmas Night"	Kaskade Christmas	co-writer, featured vocal
2017	Witt Lowry	Independent	"Lately"	I Could Not Plan This	co-writer, featured vocal
2017	Fabian Mazur	Spinnin Records	"Young Once"	N/A	co-writer, featured vocal
2018	Jason Ross	Ophelia	"Don't Give Up On Me"	N/A	co-writer, featured vocal
2018	West Coast Massive	Independent	"Until We Die Young"	N/A	co-writer, featured vocal
2018	Frank Pole	Armada Music	"Take Back My Love"	N/A	featured vocal
2019	Dabin	Seeking Blue	"Bloom"	Wild Youth	co-writer, featured vocal
2019	PLS&TY	Independent	"Summer's Young"	N/A	co-writer, featured vocal
2019	Jason Ross feat. Melanie Fontana	Ophelia	"Shelter"	N/A	co-writer
2019	Witt Lowry	Independent	"Debt"	Nevers Road	featured vocal
2020	Jason Ross	Ophelia	"1000 Faces" "Someone That I Needed"	1000 Faces	co-writer, featured vocal
2020	William Black, Fairlane	Lowly	"Butterflies"	N/A	co-writer, featured vocal
2020	Nurko	Proximity	"Faith"	N/A	co-writer, featured vocal
2020	Adventure Club	Ultra Records	"High Like This"	N/A	featured vocal
2020	Brad Breeck	WaterTower Music	"I Have Time"	We Bare Bears (Original Television Soundtrack)	featured vocal
2021	William Black	Lowly	"Haven"	Pieces	featured vocal
2022	Jason Ross	Ophelia	"Take You Home" (with MitiS) "Stay"	Atlas	featured vocal
2023	ARMNHMR	Monstercat	"True North"	Together As One	co-writer, featured vocal
2023	MitiS	Ophelia Records	"Falling Into Mystery"	Unity	co-writer, featured vocal
2026	Virtual Riot and Blanke	Monstercat	"Best Of Me"	N/A	featured vocal

== Videography ==
=== Music videos ===
Year	Title	Director
2011	"The Broken Ones"	David McClister
2013	"Over It" (with The Crystal Method)	Zak Stoltz
2013	"Stubborn Love" (with The Lumineers)	Issac Ravishankara
2017	"Don't Look Back"	Michael Kaminsky, Braverijah Gregg and Eric Tobin
2017	"Dead Man"	Andrew Ahn
2017	"Crave"	Andrew Ahn

=== Filmography ===
Year	Title	Role	Notes
2015	Blank Pages	Roosevelt	2 episodes
2016	The Crooked Man	Mia	TV movie
2017	Criminal Minds	Jillian Flanagan	Season 12 episode 11
2018	Maybe I'm Fine	Maya	
2019	I Ship It	Amber the Fangirl	Episode "Superfans"
2019	Fluid	Dr. McCallum	TV movie
2020	I Hate New Year's	Layne Price	Main Role
2020	Playing with Beethoven	Raisa	
2021	Yasuke	Ishikawa	Main Role. English Voice
2021	The Rookie	Angry Driver	1 episode
2021	Tricycles	Farrah	3 episodes
2021	Strangers Never Again	April	2 episodes
2021	Candy Coated Christmas	Chloe	TV movie
2021	Christmas at the Ranch	Lauren	TV movie
2022	Largo	Dawn Paek	1 episode
2022	Merry & Gay	Becca Winters	TV movie
2023	20 Minutes	Karen Chang	
2023	Spread	TBD	Film
