= Yamaha P-125 =

Portable digital piano

P-125
- Manufacturer: Yamaha
- Dates: 2018-2023
- Price: ~$600

Technical specifications
- Polyphony: 192
- Synthesis type: Sampler
- Velocity expression: Yes
- Storage memory: 100 KB

Input/output
- Keyboard: 88-key
- External control: USB to host

The Yamaha P-125 is a portable digital piano introduced in 2018. It replaces its predecessor, the P-115.

The P-125 has 24 voices, ranging from grand piano to rock organ, and comes with 71 preset tunes. A built in metronome and recorder help store roughly 100 KB (11,000 notes) for playback or upload via USB. The keys are Yamaha's graded hammer standard (GHS), low keys weighing more than high keys to more accurately mimic the feel of an acoustic piano. The whole piano weighs 11.8 kg (26 pounds). The shell is black or white.

The P-125 is very similar to the P-115. They have the same weight, size, polyphony and keyboard action. The P-125 has an improved two-way speaker system, USB Audio input and output, ten more voices and a slightly newer design.

In 2023, Yamaha discontinued the P-125 and replaced the model with the P-125a.

== Features ==
- 71 preset tunes (21 demo, 50 piano)
- USB to host line
- AUX out ([L/L+R][R])
- 2 6.3mm front-facing headphone jacks
- Pedal input to accompany either a standard pedal or Yamaha's LP-1 three-pedal unit. Both LP-1 pedal unit and FC3A sustain pedal support half-damper response.

== See also ==
- Yamaha P-115
- Yamaha P-85
- Yamaha P-120
- Yamaha P-250
