= Yamaha CP88-73 =

Professional stage pianos

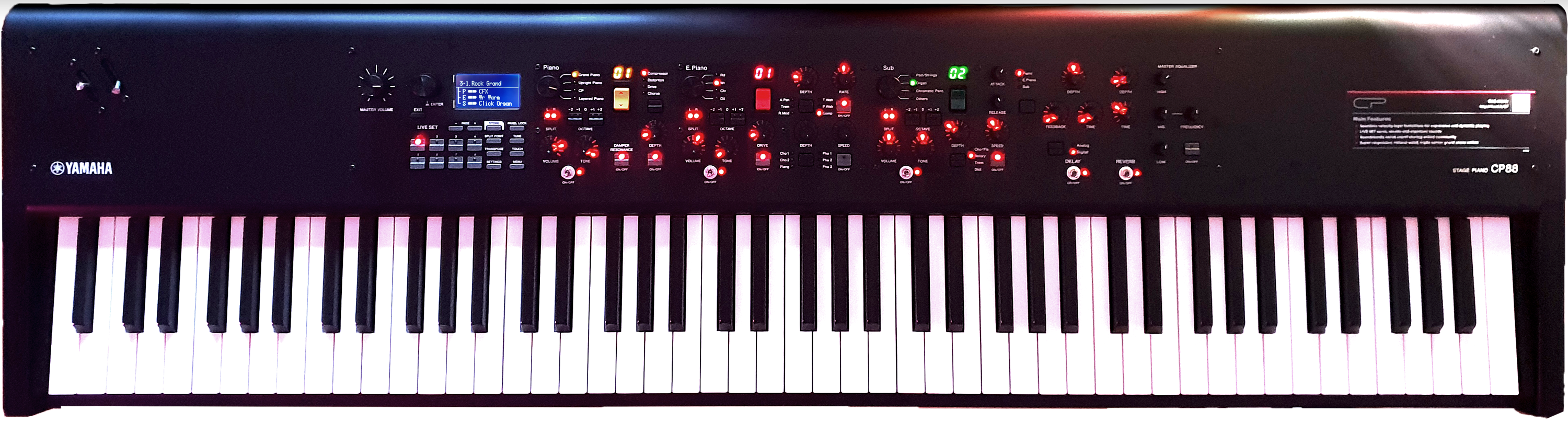
Yamaha CP88 model set to "Rock grand" preset.

Yamaha CP88 and Yamaha CP73 are professional stage pianos produced by Yamaha. These instruments are identical except for keyboard action and size. The instruments are designed to be played at live concerts on the stage, and are also suitable for recording studio due to their versatility of sound. As they are intended for professional use in locations with a preinstalled sound system, such as concert venues and recording studios, they do not have internal speakers, unlike the instruments intended for home use.

== History ==
The CP series name comes from combo piano. The history of Yamaha CP series goes back to the year 1976 with the release of the CP-70. The CP electro-acoustic pianos were highly appreciated in the 1970s and were considered some of the most useful instruments for gigging. After a decade-long period, the CP series was revived again with the advent of the CP-4 model. The current CP models' predecessors, CP-40 and CP-4 were published in 2013. The CP88 and CP73 models were first published during NAMM 2019. The new model was anticipated by many musicians as the previous instrument in the Yamaha CP series was published five years prior.

== Instrument features ==
The instrument has an easy-to-use interface for live playing and features high sound quality. In many aspects, the design resembles the popular stage pianos made by Swedish Clavia, and the interface resembles closely their Nord Stage Piano.

=== Construction ===
The instrument's high-quality chassis is built from aluminium, which makes it both robust and lightweight. The knobs and buttons appear to be of high build quality.

Both models come with the Yamaha FC3A pedal. The instrument has XLR, jack and headphone audio-out connections. It also comes with MIDI in, out and through connections as well as a USB-port MIDI connection. Like other stage pianos, the instrument does not have built-in speakers.

The larger CP88 weighs 18.6 kg, which is a reasonable weight for this kind of instrument, enabling it to be moved by a single person. The more compact CP73 weighs 13.1 kg.

=== Keyboard action ===
Model CP88 comes with Yamaha's Natural Wood Graded Hammer (NW-GH3) keyboard action. It has 88 keys, the keyboard interface standard in most upright and grand pianos. Each key has three sensors. The keyboard action is made from natural wood and synthetic ebony. The instrument attempts to mimic the feel of acoustic pianos by having a wooden core in the white keys.

Model CP73 keyboard action is Yamaha's Balanced Hammer Standard (BHS) and it is made from plastic. Each key has three sensors. The CP73 keyboard action is balanced, not graded. The keyboard runs from E1 to E7 and it comes with 73 keys. The E to E keyboard configuration is similar to one used in the Rhodes and Yamaha CP-70 electronic pianos. The 73 keys model does not have continuous pressure monitoring like 88 keys model, which could be used to add extra modulation to the sound.

=== User interface ===
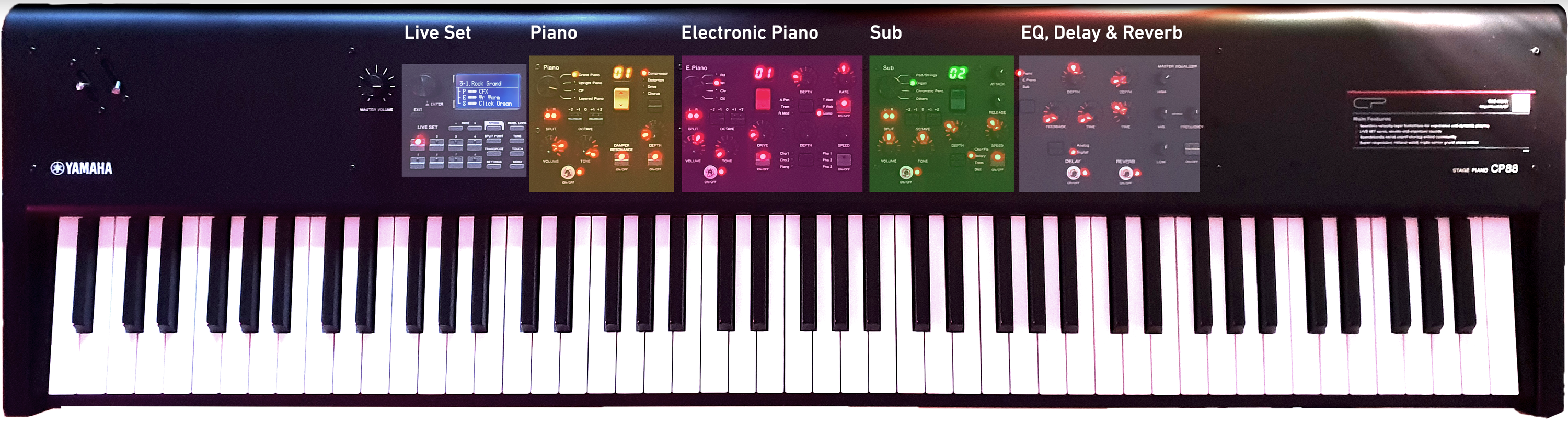
Each instrument type has its own subsection. Sections from the left: Live set allows players to choose presets on the fly. Yellow piano section allows player to select piano voice and adjust it. Red Electronic piano section allows selection of electronic pianos, such as Rhodes. Sub section includes all other instruments. The last section includes EQ, and delay and reverb effects.

The instrument user interface resembles that of Clavia Nord pianos, with its dedicated segments for various instruments. The piano has a one-to-one user interface, which means every action is behind a physical dedicated button or knob. Likewise, each physical button or switch has only one function, which is clearly labelled. Piano, electronic piano and other instruments have their own sections on the panels with both dedicated effects and selection menus.

Due to intended stage use, the interface is lighted for visibility on a dark stage. Each of the actions are clearly labeled, so playing the instrument does not require menu use.

=== Software and upgradability ===
Sound software of the instrument is Advanced Wave Memory 2 (AWM2) and it has 128 voices polyphony. This same sound software is also used on Yamaha MOXF8 and Yamaha Montage instruments.

The instrument may be updated with software updates Yamaha publishes every six months. The updates add new voices and improve the user interface.

The new Yamaha CP models have access to Yamaha's Soundmondo online library.

== Sound quality ==
=== Voices or instrument sounds ===
In total the instrument comes with 57 preset voices or instrument sounds. With the freely downloadable operating system update (version 1.40), the instrument has 106 unique voices. The instrument's voices are sample based, and have been recorded from actual instruments. They are not computer generated, meaning the instrument does not have a synthesizer in it. The instrument includes seamless sound switching, a feature in which the voices (the sounds of instruments) may be switched on the fly without cutting out the sound of the previous voice. This happens in some other instruments such that when a player changes the instrument voice, they immediately stop playing the previous sound, causing harsh sonic artifacts.

The acoustic piano voices in the instrument are expressive and of good quality. The Bösendorfer and CFX grand pianos' samples have more classical sound to them, while the S700 grand piano is more suitable for jazz and pop music setting. The acoustic piano voices have been recorded from Yamaha's grand pianos (CFX, C7 and S700) and from the Bösendorfer Imperial 290 grand piano. There is also upright piano voices that have been recorded from U1 and SU3 upright pianos.

In addition, CP88/73 has a large selection of different Rhodes and Wurlitzer voices in its electric piano section, as well as Yamaha DX sounds. The sound can be clean or funky, if various effects, such as drive and modulation effects, are adjusted accordingly. The electric pianos and clavinet sounds are well designed. They respond well to dynamic playing⸺i.e., the harder one hits the keys, the louder the sound; the softer one's touch, the softer the voice.

It also comes with various pads, organs and other instruments in a category named as Sub section. While the organs in the instrument are usable, they are basic and not customizable with drawbars.

=== Effects ===
Each of the three sections (piano, electronic piano and sub) have their own effects. In addition, all instrument sections share EQ, delay and reverb. The delay effect can be either crisp digital delay or warm analog delay. EQ comes with three adjustable segments: low frequencies (80 Hz), adjustable mid frequencies (from 100 Hz to 10 kHz) and high frequencies (5 kHz). EQ may be used to adjust up to 12 dB.

== Design awards ==
The instrument was awarded special mention in Red Dot awards. Previously the instrument has been awarded Good Design Award, Asia Design Prize Silver Award and iF Design Award.
