= P125 =

P125 may refer to:

- British Aerospace P.125, a British fighter aircraft design study
- Papyrus 125, a biblical manuscript
- TCG Bodrum (P-125), a patrol vessel of the Turkish Navy
- Yamaha P-125, a portable digital piano
- P125, a state regional road in Latvia
