= P250 =

P250 may refer to:

- SIG P250, a semi-automatic pistol
- Yamaha P-250, a digital piano
