= 400R =

400R can refer to:

- Allison World 400R, a transmission built for transit buses by Allison Transmission
- Goodyear GA-400R Gizmo, a helicopter developed by Goodyear
- Honda XR 400R, an off-road motorcycle produced by Honda
- Kawasaki Ninja 400R, a 2011 sport bike manufactured by Kawasaki
- Nismo 400R, a special edition variation of the Nissan Skyline R33
- Privia PX-400R, a digital piano manufactured by Casio
