= Meg & Dia =

American indie pop band

Meg and Dia
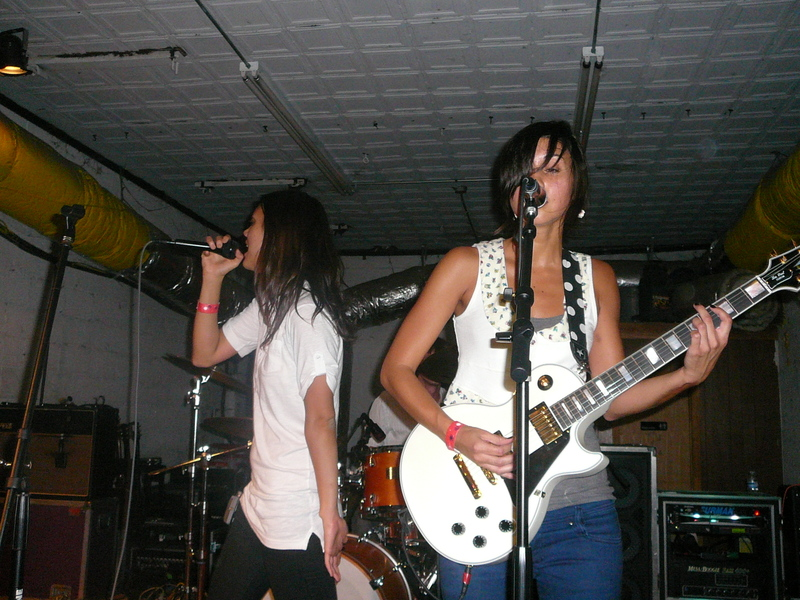
- Dia (left) and Meg (right) performing at Sector 7G in 2008

Background information
- Origin: Draper, Utah, United States
- Genres: Indie pop, pop rock, emo pop
- Years active: 2004–2012, 2019–present
- Labels: Doghouse (2005–2010); Warner Bros. (2007–2010); Independent (2005, 2011–2012); Pure Noise (2019–present)
- Members: Meg Frampton; Dia Frampton
- Past members: Ryan Groskreutz; Nicholas Price; Kenji Chan; Aaron McMurray; Jonathan Snyder; Jimmy Welsh

Meg & Dia is an American musical band formed in 2004. It was founded by sisters Meg and Dia Frampton before becoming a five-piece act (renamed Cowards Courage and released the CD Straight Out of a Story Book in Las Vegas) where they started, with additional members Eddie Friends, Ryan Hardy, Jon Cash and Alex Kruse. With the departure of the latter three, Meg & Dia subsequently reverted to their root name with additional members Nicholas Price, Jonathan Snyder (formerly of Madison) and Carlo Gimenez.

Meg & Dia (also then known as The Meg & Dia Band) released their debut album, Our Home is Gone, in 2005. At the time, the band consisted of just the two Frampton sisters, and the album's tracks were mostly acoustic songs. Meg played guitar and provided back-up vocals while Dia sang. A year later, they released their second album, Something Real which featured their most well known song "Monster", their first album released under Doghouse Records.

The band signed with Warner Bros. Records in 2007 and released Here, Here and Here in 2009 via Sire Records. Before disbanding, they were signed under the name Dia Frampton to Universal Republic.

== History ==
=== Early life: The Frampton sisters ===
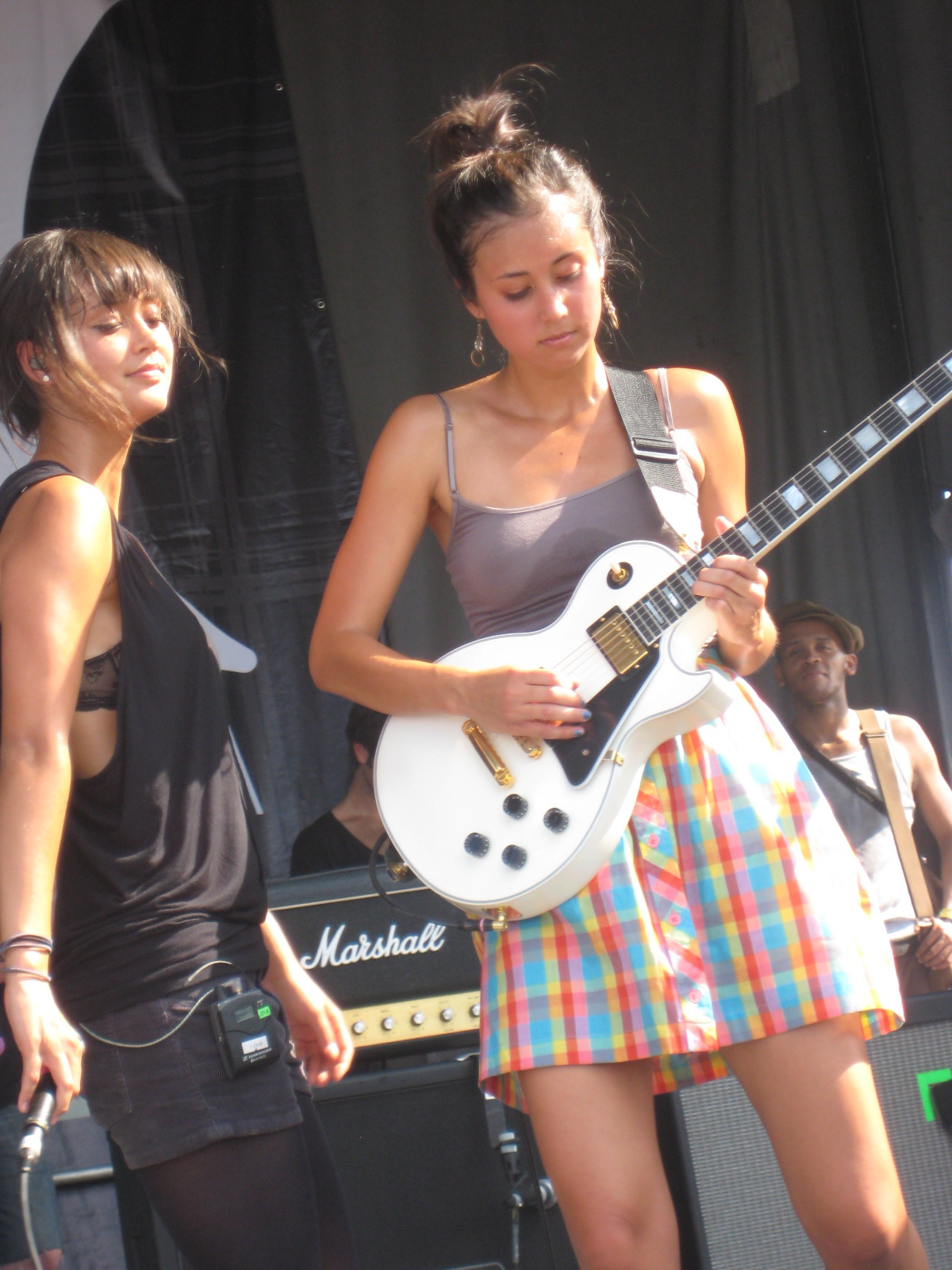
Dia (left) and Meg (right) performing at the 2009 Vans Warped Tour

Meg received a karaoke machine and Dia received a guitar as a Christmas gift. Dia began singing at local county fairs and retirement centers while Meg taught herself to play songs that were on the radio. Their father was a DJ in South Korea, and the sisters often listened to his extensive record collection. The family of the Frampton sisters is composed of Meg, Dia, Jade, Rena, Nikki, Misty. Jade plays tennis for the University of Arkansas and she aspires to be a professional in the near future.

“For Christmas when we were kids, ironically Dia got the guitar and I got the karaoke machine. We quickly learned, however, what we were natural at and destined to become. She became really focused on her voice and began singing little country ditties at local county fairs and retirement centers. I started out playing whatever was on the radio or whatever happened to be in my buddies' CD player. My dad was a DJ in his early twenties so he had quite an extensive record collection that I listened to occasionally. After I experienced my first heartbreak and I thought the world was going to end, the natural way to console my tattered heart was to write a song. Of course my parents, being the supportive and loving caretakers they are, showered me with much undeserved praise and encouraged me to keep writing. My sister and I heeded their advice and began writing and playing original songs together." – Meg

"Indiana"
A sample of "Indiana" from Our Home Is Gone, when Meg & Dia were an acoustic band composed of just Meg and Dia.

=== 2005: debut Our Home Is Gone ===
Meg & Dia self-released their debut album, Our Home Is Gone, in 2005. Only 1,000 copies were ever produced (all of which were distributed by the Frampton girls themselves). The album featured a mostly acoustic style of music, as it was only Meg and Dia in the band. They toured extensively in support of it, sharing stages with such national acts as Limbeck, The Format, Melee, An Angle, Koufax, and Steel Train.

After a few acoustic shows playing the songs from their debut album, they decided they needed a bigger sound. They recruited drummer Nicholas Price, and later guitarist Kenji Chan in 2005. Nick was Meg's car mechanic after she was involved in a minor car accident (which also is the result of the name for the EP What Is It? A Fender Bender). After Nick joined, Meg and Dia found bassist Ryan Groskreuetz. The songs "Nineteen Stars" and "Indiana" were included on the Frampton sisters' next album, Something Real. "Timmy" was re-worked into song "Roses" for Something Real.

"Roses"
A sample of "Roses" from Something Real, Meg & Dia's first full band album.

=== 2006: Something Real ===
In January 2006 Meg and Dia recorded a second album, Something Real, with producer Stacy Jones of American Hi-Fi and Bill Leffler. As a teaser for the album, Meg & Dia released an EP titled What Is It? A Fender Bender, on both iTunes and the Tower Records website in July 2006. What Is It? A Fender Bender featured "Monster" and "Indiana", and would also be part of their upcoming album. That album was soon-after released on August 8, 2006. Something Real is made up both new works and revamped versions of acoustic songs from Our Home is Gone. The songs "Indiana", "Masterpiece", and "Nineteen Stars" were rerecorded with a full band, while parts of "Timmy" were incorporated into the song "Roses".

In September 2006, it was announced on the Meg & Dia MySpace page that guitarist Kenji Chan was leaving the band to focus on his solo career. His departure was on amicable terms. The band found a replacement guitarist via YouTube, Canadian Carlo Gimenez, and the band was once again a five-piece act.

The band gained popularity through self-promotion via MySpace; they were selected as the official MySpace band on the Warped Tour 2006. Being selected as the official MySpace band came about in a peculiar way; technical staff were supposed to shut down Meg & Dia's official MySpace due to a virus script posted by an unscrupulous character. However, the technical difficulties resulted in the band gaining the attention of Tom Anderson, co-founder of MySpace, who then entered them into a contest to become the official MySpace band at Warped Tour; Meg & Dia won. Meg & Dia played at Warped Tour 2006 in the MySpace tent, which had a dirt floor in lieu of a stage.

Meg & Dia returned the following year, playing the Hurley.com stage in the 2007 Warped Tour. The band continued touring and played alongside Anberlin, Jonezetta, and Bayside on a national tour in early 2007, and with Say Anything and Saves The Day in Spring 2007.

=== 2007 ===
On February 19, 2007 it was confirmed that Meg & Dia signed a deal with Warner Bros. Records. The song "Roses" was featured on the TMNT movie soundtrack. In September, Meg and Dia provided back-up vocals for The Rocket Summer for their "Yahoo! Who's Next?" debut. The video for "Monster" was nominated for the mtvU Viral Woodie Award in 2007. It advanced past the first round, but lost in the final round to We've Got A Big Mess On Our Hands by The Academy Is.... Meg & Dia finished the year on tour with The Spill Canvas, PlayRadioPlay!, and Treaty of Paris.

Meg & Dia are also involved in To Write Love on Her Arms and peta2. The band appeared in an anti-fur ad and also sponsored a fashion contest on the peta2 website.

Their song, "The Mighty R-E-A-L", is the official anthem for Real Salt Lake of Major League Soccer.

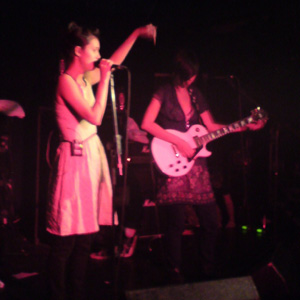
Dia (left) and Meg (right) performing at Carling Academy Birmingham in May 2008

=== 2008–2009: Touring, Here, here and here ===
In November 2007, Angels & Airwaves confirmed that their tour in the United States would have Meg & Dia as openers, along with The Color Fred and Ace Enders. The tour ran from January 30 to March 15. Afterwards, the band went to Los Angeles on March 17, to record for their album Here, Here and Here.

Meg & Dia made its first United Kingdom appearance at the annual Give It A Name festival in 2008. The band played in London on May 10, and Sheffield on May 11. Shortly afterward, the band played Give It A Name Introduces, a ten venue spin-off tour in England, Scotland and Wales, along with fellow American artists Four Year Strong, Mayday Parade and The Color Fred.

Over the summer, the band continued recording for their studio album, and in August, toured the United States to promote Something Real. The tour consisted of 16 dates, with opening acts by alternative rockers Jonezetta, Dropping Daylight, and occasionally Danger Radio. In September, the band visited the European continent for the first time, touring with Melee, visiting venues from Vienna to Amsterdam and Munich, and returned to the United Kingdom in October. The concerts received positive reviews by many European critics. From February to April 2009, the band participated in the Take Action 2009 tour, accompanying headliners Cute Is What We Aim For and opening acts Anarbor, Every Avenue, and Breathe Carolina. A portion of all ticket sales was donated to non-profit organizations.

Here, Here and Here was released on April 21, over a year after recording was completed. It was sold in three formats- CD, CD + DVD package, and on vinyl. The album marks the band's first new release since signing with Warner Bros. (distributed through Sire Records) and the first with the band's current lineup. Musically, the album differs from previous efforts, as a result of experimentation with new instruments (strings, synths, harmonica and alternative percussion) and the inclusion of guest vocals (Tom Higgenson on "Bored Of Your Love"). Tonally, the album includes more mature themes such as religion ("Black Wedding") and politics ("Are There Giants Too, In The Dance?"). In contrast to the heavily literature-inspired Something Real, only one song from here, here and here has been definitively linked to a novel ("Hug Me" was inspired by Brave New World), and several songs were written by Dia in response to her then recent breakup ("Going Away"). The title of the album comes from the eponymous closing track, which alludes to the composition process of Mozart in the lines: "'Here, Here, and Here.' He pointed to his heart and mind and ears."

The first single from the new album, "What If", was released on January 27. The second single, "Black Wedding", was released a week later. The video for "Black Wedding" was released exclusively on April 14, for play on MTV and MTV.com.

Meg, Dia and Price appeared in an episode of the BETA Records TV show where they promoted Here, Here and Here. The episode included clips of the band performing "Going Away". The band participated in the Warped Tour 2009. This was their third Warped appearance.

On October 16, the band posted on their website a new song called "5 Reasons." Meg commented that it is about a conversation she and her sister had with her mother while they were on break from a tour. From October 17 to November 29, the band toured the United States with Never Shout Never, Now, Now Every Children, and Carter Hulsey. Members of the band were featured in Never Shout Never's music video, "What is Love?" Dashboard Confessional joined the tour from November 8–29.

=== 2010–2012: Independent, Stormy, Cocoon, and break up ===
In July 2010, Meg & Dia announced that they were dropped from their label, Warner Bros. Records. Meg & Dia remain unsigned. The band has confirmed that they have recorded a new record, independent of a label, with producer Charlie Vela.

The band released the EP It's Always Stormy in Tillamook on November 2. For the first 500 people that ordered a physical copy from their website, a password and link was emailed to receive the secret song "Down The Open Road." Meg and Dia toured from November 9 – December 4 across the continental United States with Joey Ryan and The Spring Standards.

On April 5, 2011 the band released its fourth studio album titled Cocoon, featuring 11 tracks.

On June 29, Dia was named the runner-up on the television show The Voice. She came in second to Javier Colon. On December 6, she released her solo debut record, Red.

On December 20, the band released the EP "Be Careful, I Love You, Stay In Touch", featuring songs that didn't make it on "Cocoon." It was previously only available to those who frequently commented on the Meg & Dia forums via dropcards.com.

On October 29, 2012, Meg posted an official statement announcing the official disbandment of Meg & Dia to go back to school and concentrate on her solo career. She stated that she and Nick Price are still making music together as are Dia Frampton and Carlo Gimenez, but no more music was to be released under the name Meg & Dia.

=== 2019: Reunion and 5th Album ===
On April 1, 2019, the official Meg & Dia social media pages announced that they would be reforming to play the Vans Warped Tour. On July 26 they surprise-released their fifth full-length album, happysad, via Pure Noise Records. On November 1, they announced their new Christmas album, December, Darling, featuring both classic and new original songs would release November 15. They also released a single by the same name on November 1.

== Members ==
=== Dia Frampton ===
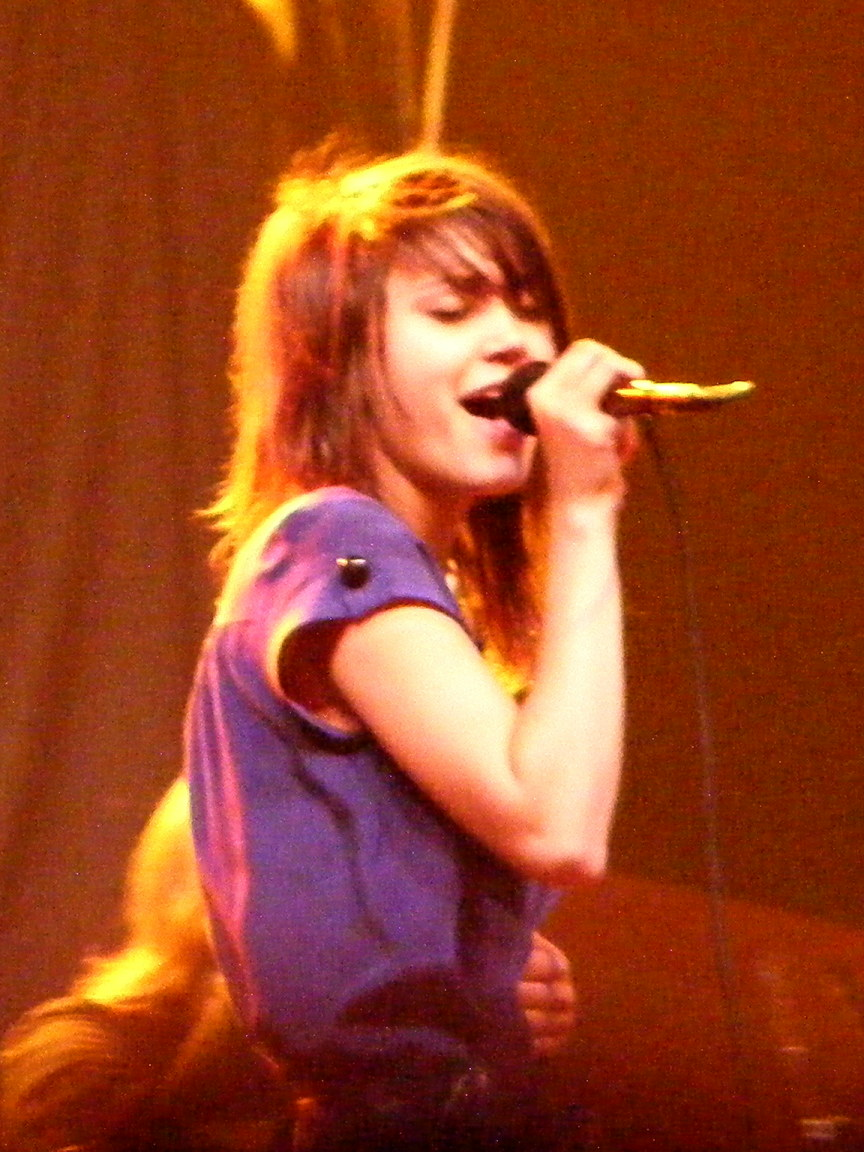
Dia performing at the Roseland Ballroom in February 2008

Dia Leif Frampton (born October 2, 1987) was the lead singer of the band. She attended Dixie High School in St. George, Utah and Shadow Ridge High School in Las Vegas, Nevada; she graduated early by also homeschooling her senior year at the same time attending public school for her junior year in 2005 then moved to Salt Lake City with her sister to further their music career. She cites as influences Modest Mouse, Tom Petty and the Heartbreakers, Joni Mitchell, The Avett Brothers, Rocky Votolato, Ben Folds, Etta James, Death Cab for Cutie, The Cranberries, and Cursive. During live performances, Dia plays percussion instruments, such as the cowbell and tambourine, and occasionally a Casio Privia keyboard. She almost always performs without shoes on. She also does not like to eat anything within two hours of performing. Dia often recorded a "song diary," an impromptu recorded song, on her MySpace page. She explained, "It was something very raw, and to be honest, something that I was slightly embarrassed to put up because of the quality but I did anyways, for any of our listeners who would care to hear something not hot off the production belt, but something more organic and 'home made.' It made me feel better to share my feelings with people who could connect, and I think that is what happened with many."

Dia was featured in "Where Are You Now?", a song by The Summer Set. The song was released on the band's album, "Love Like This", on October 13, 2009.

Dia was a contestant (and eventual runner-up) on the first season of The Voice on NBC, introduced as a children's story author. She was selected to be on the team of coach Blake Shelton, who stated, "when I heard your voice, I started to smile." Dia advanced through the show's quarter-finals and semi-finales after renditions of "Heartless" and "Losing My Religion". In the season finale, she sang "Inventing Shadows", an original song written by Fraser T Smith. Notably, the aforementioned singles were the highest charting iTunes digital songs by any contestant on The Voice during its respective voting eligibility period, with "Inventing Shadows" topping the charts at No. 1. Following the season finale on June 29, 2011, "Inventing Shadows" debuted at No. 20 on the Billboard Hot 100 with 137,000 downloads sold. As of July 7, 2011 Dia's The Voice digital releases have sold 480,000 downloads. She was the opening act on the Well Lit & Amplified tour with her voice mentor and country musician Blake Shelton, as well as performing several headlining shows of her own between Blake Shelton tour dates. At these shows, her opening act is Canadian singer/songwriter Andrew Allen. Dia's single, "The Broken Ones," was released on November 15, 2011, and her solo album, Red, was released on December 6, 2011. Dia wrote (or co-wrote) every song on Red. Notable co-written songs include "Billy the Kid", which she wrote with Mark Foster and Isom Innis, lead singer and keyboard player for Foster the People respectively, "Hearts out to Dry," which she wrote with her sister, Meg, and "Bullseye," which she wrote with Isabella Summers, the keyboard player for Florence and the Machine. On May 14, 2014 Dia announced her new music project Archis, a collaboration with film composer Joseph Trapanese and subsequently revealed their first single "Blood".

Dia was a contestant on the 7th season of Korea's talent show, SuperStar K7.

=== Meg Frampton ===
Meg Frampton (born April 3, 1985) played guitar and did back-up vocals for the band. She attended and was a cheerleader at Dixie High School in St. George, Utah and the University of Utah in Salt Lake City. She also writes most of the songs on the albums, and finds comfort in her novels. On stage, she alternated between a Vintage White Fender American Telecaster and a Gibson ES-335 Dot in sunburst, and a white Gibson Les Paul Custom, though she has also played a black Gibson Les Paul Studio in the past. Currently, she plays a glittery-gold Gretsch guitar on the Dia Frampton and Blake Shelton tours. For acoustic songs, she played a Taylor 814ce acoustic. Meg often performed wearing cap sleeve dresses. For the Blake Shelton and Dia Frampton tours, she wears a black sequin dress and silver sequin heels (which she refers to as her "heels of death.") Meg provides the lead vocals and plays keyboard for the song "Rebecca". Recently Meg has provided intro solos for some of the band's songs during live performances such as Roses and Monster. Meg Frampton decided to leave the band in June 2012 for personal and creative reasons. Jimmy Welsh, formerly of the Boston band Small Talk, has joined the band to fill in for Meg. She made a demo with Nick on a side project band called The Khaki Scouts.

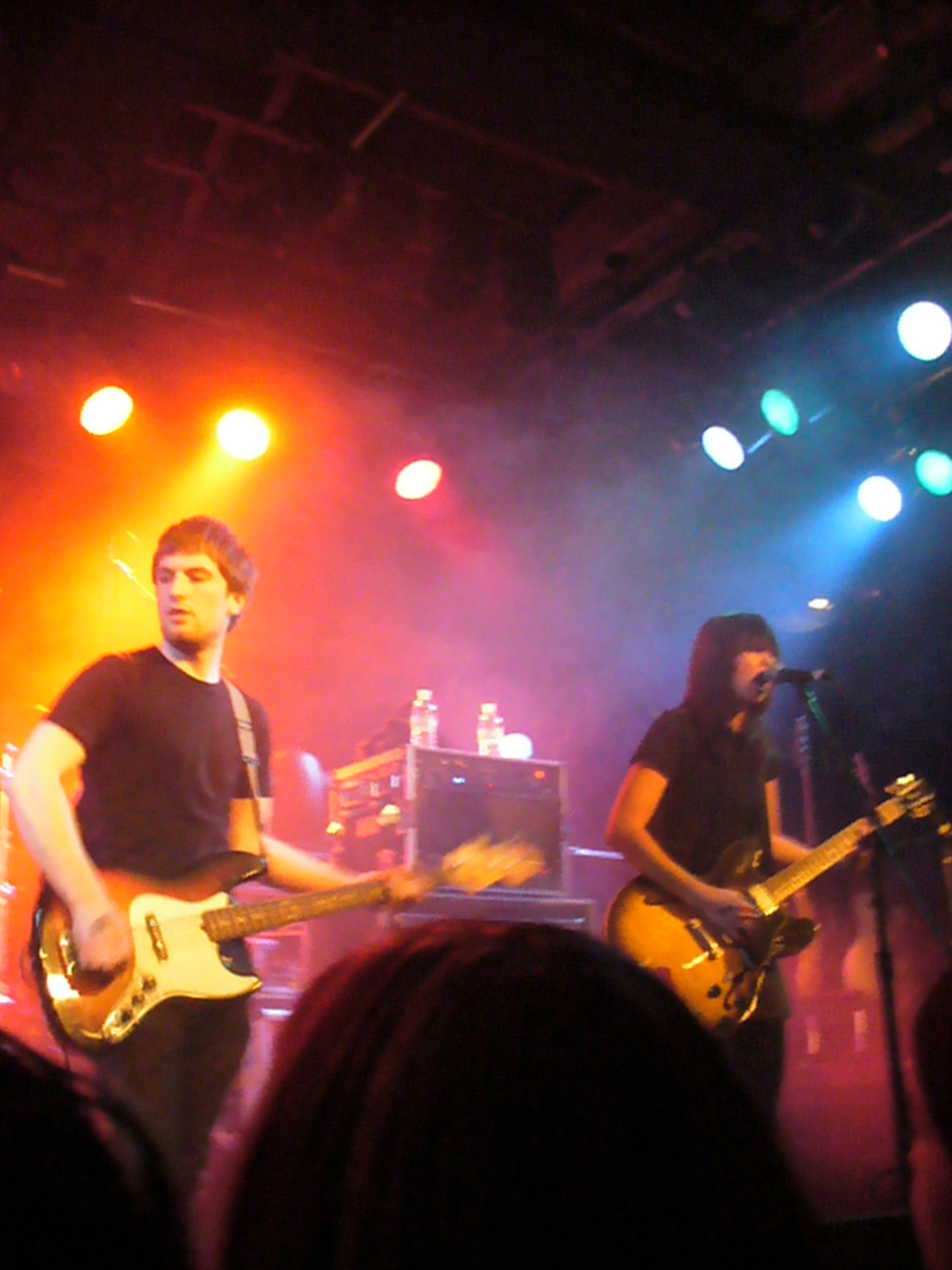
Snyder and Meg performing in 2007

=== Nicholas Price ===
Nicholas Price (born May 27, 1984) was the drummer for the band. He was raised in Salt Lake City, Utah and began playing drums at the age of 14. He was also in the 2004 University of Utah's Drumline. Drumming influences: John Bonham, Chad Smith, José Pasillas, Jimmy Chamberlin, Dave Grohl, Joe Morello, Stewart Copeland, Steve Jordan, Matt Chamberlain, Joseph Modeliste.

=== Jonathan Snyder ===
Jonathan Snyder (born July 29, 1986) was the bassist of the band. He was born and raised in Bergen County, NJ. He began playing bass at age 13 in a local pop punk band Duckhunt. After some member changes and heavy life experiences, Duckhunt became Madison, based in Dumont, NJ. The band toured for the better part of four years, including Hellogoodbye's first East Coast stint, until they amicably broke up in September 2006. Meg & Dia found Jonathan through Aric Phillips who worked for Doghouse Records, their label at the time. Nick contacted him and he became a member of the band. On stage, Jonathan exclusively played Fender Jazz Bass and a Gibson Grabber Bass through a Mesa/Boogie 400+ amplifier.

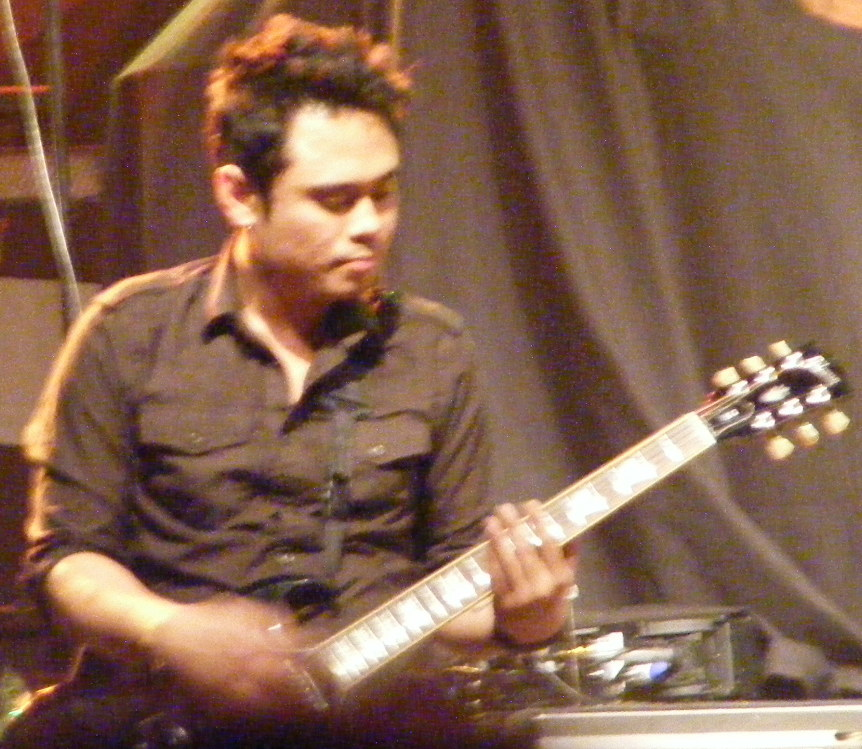
Gimenez performing at the Roseland Ballroom in 2008

=== Carlo Gimenez ===
Carlo Gimenez (born September 1, 1982) was the lead guitarist for the band. He was born to Filipino parents and raised in Vancouver, British Columbia, Canada. He began playing guitar at the age of 9 years. He states influences as Paul Gilbert, Joe Satriani, Stevie Ray Vaughan, George Benson, David Sanborn, Hiram Bullock and Kenny Wayne Shepherd. Nick found Carlo on YouTube when he was browsing videos, yet he was very flattered. Carlo had several videos of himself playing, which impressed Nick, who sent him messages asking him to join. On stage, Gimenez normally played a Gibson Les Paul when performing. He returned to the band for the 2019–present reunion.

== Personnel ==
- Mike Kaminsky – Manager
- Jake Katz – F.O.H.

== Band members ==
Band role	Year								
Band role	2003	2004	2005	2006	2007	2012	2019	2020	2021
Lead vocals, keyboards	Dia Frampton								
Rhythm guitar, backing vocals	Meg Frampton								
Lead guitar	Meg Frampton		Kenji Chan		Carlo Gimenez				Meg Frampton
Bass		Ryan Groskreutz		Aaron McMurray	Jonathan Snyder			Carlo Gimenez Meg Frampton	Meg Frampton
Drums		Nick Price					Matty Best (touring) Grant Whitson (touring)	Grant Whitson (touring)	

Timeline

== Influences ==
Meg and Dia have stated in interviews that many of their songs are influenced by literature, and that it has had a big influence on their lives. Many of their songs are based on books: "Monster" was based on the Cathy Ames character in East of Eden by John Steinbeck; "Indiana" was based on Indiana by George Sand; and "Rebecca" was based on Rebecca by Daphne du Maurier. "Tell Mary" was based on Mary by Vladimir Nabokov. "Hug Me" is based on Brave New World by Aldous Huxley.

"Courage Robert" was influenced by and written about Robert Schumann, a famous pianist and composer. The song "Here, Here and Here" references Mozart.

== Discography ==
=== Albums ===
Date of release	Title	Label
August 12, 2005	Our Home Is Gone	Independent
August 8, 2006	Something Real	Doghouse Records & Warner Bros.
April 21, 2009	Here, Here and Here	Doghouse Records & Warner Bros. (distributed by Sire Records)
April 5, 2011	Cocoon	Independent
July 26, 2019	happysad	Pure Noise Records
November 15, 2019	December, Darling	Pure Noise Records
December 1, 2024	Mosaic	Independent

=== EPs ===
Date of release	Title
July 8, 2006	What Is It? A Fender Bender
October 3, 2006	Warped Tour Sessions
June 29, 2007	If You're Poor, Find Something to Sue Somebody For...
July 10, 2009	Hurley Live Sessions 2009
November 2, 2010	It's Always Stormy in Tillamook
December 10, 2011	Be Careful, I Love You, Stay In Touch.

=== Compilations ===
- A Santa Cause 2 – contributed "Joey Had A Smoke"
- Teenage Mutant Ninja Turtles O.S.T. – contributed "Roses"
- Warped Tour 2007 Tour Compilation – contributed "Monster"
- Warped Tour 2009 Tour Compilation – contributed "Going Away"
- Take Action! Vol. 6 – contributed "Monster"
- Take Action! Vol. 7 – contributed "Roses"
- Take Action! Vol. 8 – contributed "Halloween"
- Purevolume.com Lost Sessions – contributed "Roses (Acoustic)", "Lessons In NJ (Acoustic)", and "Masterpiece (Acoustic)"

=== Singles ===
- 2006: "Monster"
- 2007: "Roses"
- 2008: "What if"
- 2009: "Black Wedding"
- 2019: "December, Darling"
- 2024: "Smoke City"

=== Music videos ===
Year	Title	Director
2006	"Monster"	Travis Kopach
2007	"Roses"	Lex Halaby
2009	"Black Wedding"	Aaron Platt
2011	"My Ugly Mouth"	Bryan Schlam
2019	"American Spirit"	Saman Kesh & Justin Hopkins
2019	"Teenagers"	OMG EVERYWHERE LA
2019	"December, Darling"	Joseph Yao
2019	"Have Yourself A Merry Little Christmas"	Joseph Yao
2019	"Lights Blown Out"	Joseph Yao
