= Bruises (album) =

2017 studio album by Dia Frampton

Studio album by Dia Frampton
- Released: March 3, 2017
- Genre: Pop
- Length: 46:37
- Label: Nettwerk
- Producer: Leggy Langdon; Dan Heath; Seth Jones

Dia Frampton chronology
Red (2011)	Bruises (2017)	Bruises Raw (2017)

Singles from Bruises
- 1. "Golden Years" Released: October 7, 2016; 2. "Gold and Silver" Released: November 19, 2016; 3. "Crave" Released: January 28, 2017; 4. "Dead Man" Released: February 18, 2017

Bruises is the second studio album by the American singer-songwriter Dia Frampton. It was released on March 3, 2017, through Nettwerk Music Group. Mainly produced by Dan Heath, Bruises was promoted by four singles: "Golden Years", "Gold and Silver", "Crave", and "Dead Man". The album received generally positive reviews from music critics, reaching at number 39 and 14 on Billboard's Independent Albums and Heatseekers Albums chart, respectively.

== Background ==
In late 2012, Frampton released her debut studio album, Red, which debuted at number one on the Billboard Top Heatseekers chart. Following her appearance as the runner-up on the first season of The Voice in 2011, she experienced both commercial exposure and industry challenges, including label changes and collaborations with various artists. She talked about then-upcoming studio album Bruises, produced by Dan Heath, was shaped by her challenging efforts to reclaim happiness after a phase of reality-TV exposure that affected her career.

== Composition ==
Although Bruises adpots "an earthier core", it has been described as a "modern pop" record. In discussing its themes, Frampton explained that Bruises is "about the ups and downs of life", which encompasses moments of "shining in light" as well as "sinking in darkness", focusing on both "wins and losses" and a sense of hope. She added that each track represents "either experience: the light or the dark". Musically, these contrasts are shown in arrangements that shift between restraint and intensity; one such moment features a horn-filled build-up that "borders on overwhelming". It incorporates a sparkle of her journey and aspiration, and Frampton adpots "ethereal route" on it. As noted by AllMusic, this combination of "self-awareness and vulnerability" lends Bruises a confessional quality with Frampton's openness, which forms a direct emotional connection to the listener through what has been described as her "soul-baring purity".

"Blind"
A 27-second sample of "Blind". It features Frampton "croon[ing]" lines, capturing a yearning for "ignorant bliss".

Its opener "Hope" encompasses "a cinematic quality", while "Gold and Silver" offers "soft, airy vocal flips into falsetto". Lyrically, "Gold and Silver" focuses on "summer nostalgia", although "its piano chords sound downright Autumnal". Frampton accompanies Korean heritage in "Out of the Dark" as well as "Lights"; in the former, she appears to be responding to Lorde's song, "Buzzcut Season". "Golden Years" focuses on harp strings and violins, which could be an extension of "Between Two Hungs" by Florence and the Machine. In "Crave", Dan Heath's production is evident in the "cinematic scope" given to Lana Del Rey. While "Lights" brings a vibe of Coldplay, "Don't Look Back" summons comparisons ranging from Owl City to Sigur Ros' ongoing theatrical production. "Blind" is a "horn-filled" song that contains its mantra.

== Singles ==
"Golden Years" was released as the lead single from it, on October 7, 2016. "Gold and Silver" was officially released on November 19, as the second single from it. On January 19, 2017, "Crave" premiered at BlackBook magazine, later serving as the third single on January 28. The fourth and last single, "Dead Man", was released on February 18. Its music video was released on May 25, directed by Korean-American filmmaker Andrew Ahn. The music video for "Crave" was released on June 27, also directed by Ahn, serving as the second part of a two-part series.

== Critical reception ==
Professional ratings
Review scores
Source	Rating
AllMusic	4/5 stars

Neil Z. Yeung from AllMusic gave Bruises 4 out of 5 stars, describing it as a deeply emotional and mature album that chronicles Frampton's struggles in the music industry. ABC News wrote that Bruises is an often "stirring record", suggesting that Frampton is "carv[ing] out her own niche" as she continues on this path, and observed that the clear tonal shift from Red (2011) reflects a stronger need to feed her artistic muse and express herself. They contrasted the two projects by noting that while Red was made to "court the pop masses", Bruises represents a markedly "much deeper effort".

== Track listing ==
All tracks were produced by Dan Heath, except where noted.

Bruises track listing
No.	Title	Writer(s)	Producer(s)	Length
1.	"Hope"	Dia Frampton; Jose Villanueva; Matthew Morgan		3:08
2.	"Out of the Dark"	Frampton; Seth Jones	Heath; Jones	3:28
3.	"Gold and Silver"	Frampton; Heath; Andrea Katherine Claire Lands		4:25
4.	"Dead Man"	Frampton; Dan Romer		3:40
5.	"Lights"	Frampton; Blake Stranathan; Heath		3:53
6.	"Golden Years"	Frampton; Heath; Tim Anderson	Leggy Langdon; Heath	3:48
7.	"Crave"	Frampton; Wrabel; Nico Stadi		3:40
8.	"Don't Look Back"	Frampton; Heath		4:41
9.	"Blind"	Frampton; Jones		4:36
10.	"Chances"	Frampton; Tyler Lyle; Villanueva; Joseph Trapanese; Heath		3:28
11.	"White Dress"	Frampton; Heath		3:58
12.	"Die Wild"	Frampton; Lyle; Heath		3:58
Total length:				46:37

== Personnel ==
Credits were adapted from AllMusic.

- Blake Stranathan – composer
- Christian "Leggy" Langdon – mixing, producer
- Claire Landis – composer
- Dan Heath – composer, engineer, producer
- Dan Romer – composer
- Dia Frampton – composer, primary artist
- Eric Tobin – photography
- Gergely Kiss – management
- Greg Calbi – mastering
- Hungarian Studio Orchestra – score
- Joel Shearer – guitar
- John Rummen – design
- Jose Villanueva – composer
- Joseph Trapanese – composer
- Matt Morgan – composer
- Michael Kaminsky – photography
- Nathaniel Smith – orchestration
- Nico Stadi – composer
- Peter Kanyurszky – concert master
- Péter Pejtsik – conductor
- Sandor Jozsa – contractor
- Seth Jones – composer, producer
- Stephen Wrabel – composer
- Tamás Kurina – engineer
- Tim Anderson – composer, guitar
- Tyler Lyle – composer

== Charts ==
Chart (2017)	Peak position
US Independent Albums (Billboard)	39
US Heatseekers Albums (Billboard)	14

== Bruises Raw ==
Bruises Raw

EP by Dia Frampton
- Released: July 7, 2017
- Length: 10:17
- Label: Nettwerk
- Producer: Seth Jones

Dia Frampton chronology
Bruises (2011)	Bruises Raw (2017)	Yule Tunes (2017)

On July 7, 2017, Frampton released her first extended play (EP) thourgh Nettwerk Music Group, titled Bruises Raw. It contains three acoustic versions of Bruises's original tracks; "Blind", "Die Wild" and "Out of Dark". The EP was produced by Seth Jones.

=== Track listing ===
All tracks were produced by Seth Jones.

Bruises Raw track listing
No.	Title	Writer(s)	Length
1.	"Blind" (acoustic)	Dia Frampton; Jones	4:04
2.	"Die Wild" (acoustic)	Frampton; Tyler Lyle	2:42
3.	"Out of the Dark" (acoustic)	Frampton; Jones	3:31
Total length:			10:17
