= Yamaha P-120 =

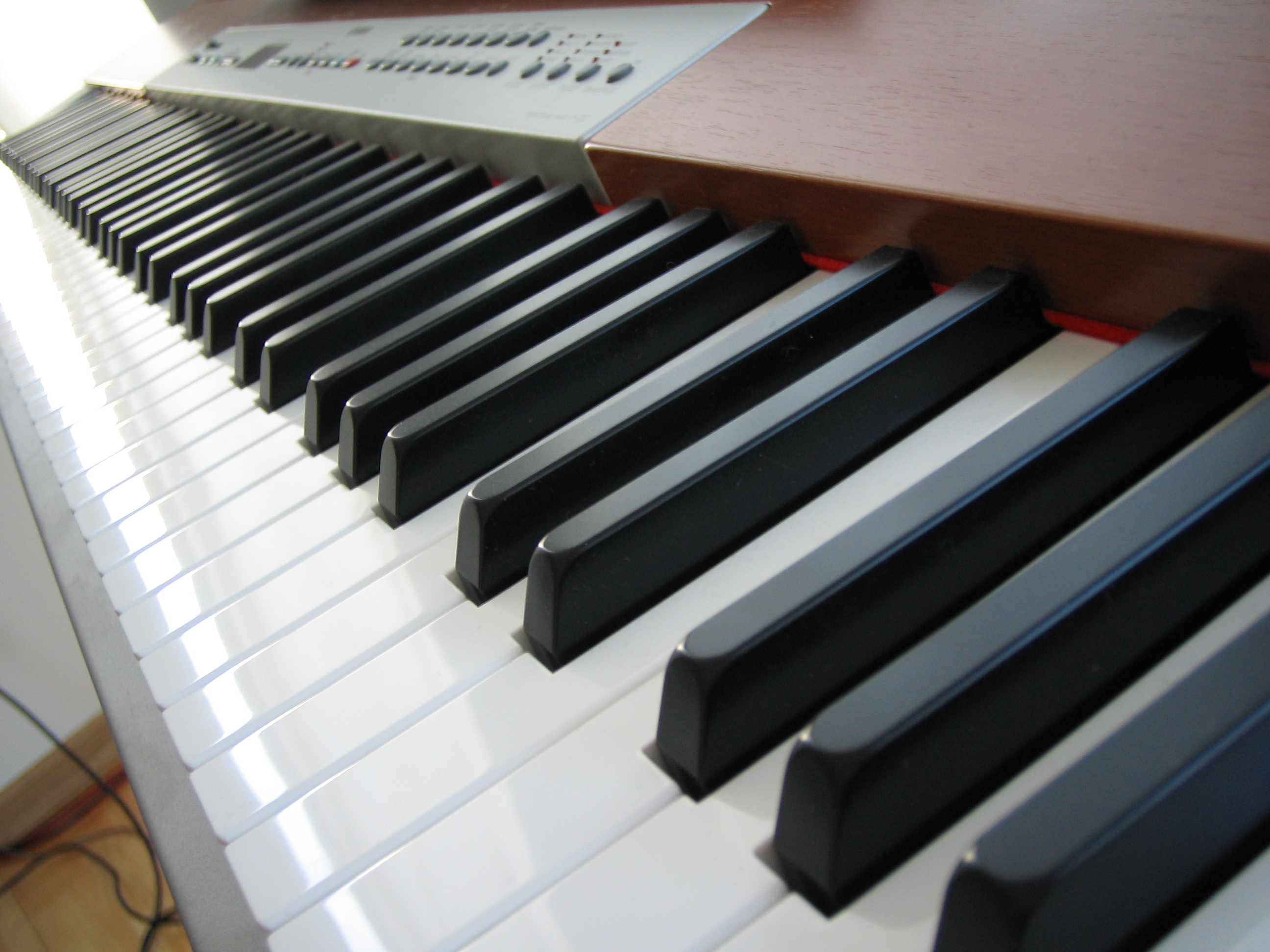
Yamaha P-120

The Yamaha P-120 is a portable electronic piano, released in 2002. The 88-key so-called "GH" keyboard is action-weighted, imitating the feel of a real piano. It includes several sample keyboard sounds, such as harpsichord, clavichord, vibraphone, guitar and more. Basic sequencing and editing are built-in.

== Customer service ==
Problems with keys sticking have been reported, caused by the plastic reacting with the grease used to form an adhesive-like substance. This has been recognised by Yamaha. Yamaha originally offered to replace the key-bed (part cost only) if sticky keys were experienced. In 2012 this changed to labor cost only. On December 31, 2013, the replacement program ended, and customers paid both parts and labor from that date.

== Features ==
- Polyphony: 64
- 3 x 2-track sequencer
- onboard 2x 12.5W speaker
- metronome with different accents, from 32 to 280 bpm
- 14 sounds, 1 variation each, totalling 28
- onboard chorus, reverb, delay and phaser effects

== See also ==
- Yamaha P-85
- Yamaha P-115
- Yamaha P-250
