= Yamaha CP300 =

Digital stage piano by Yamaha

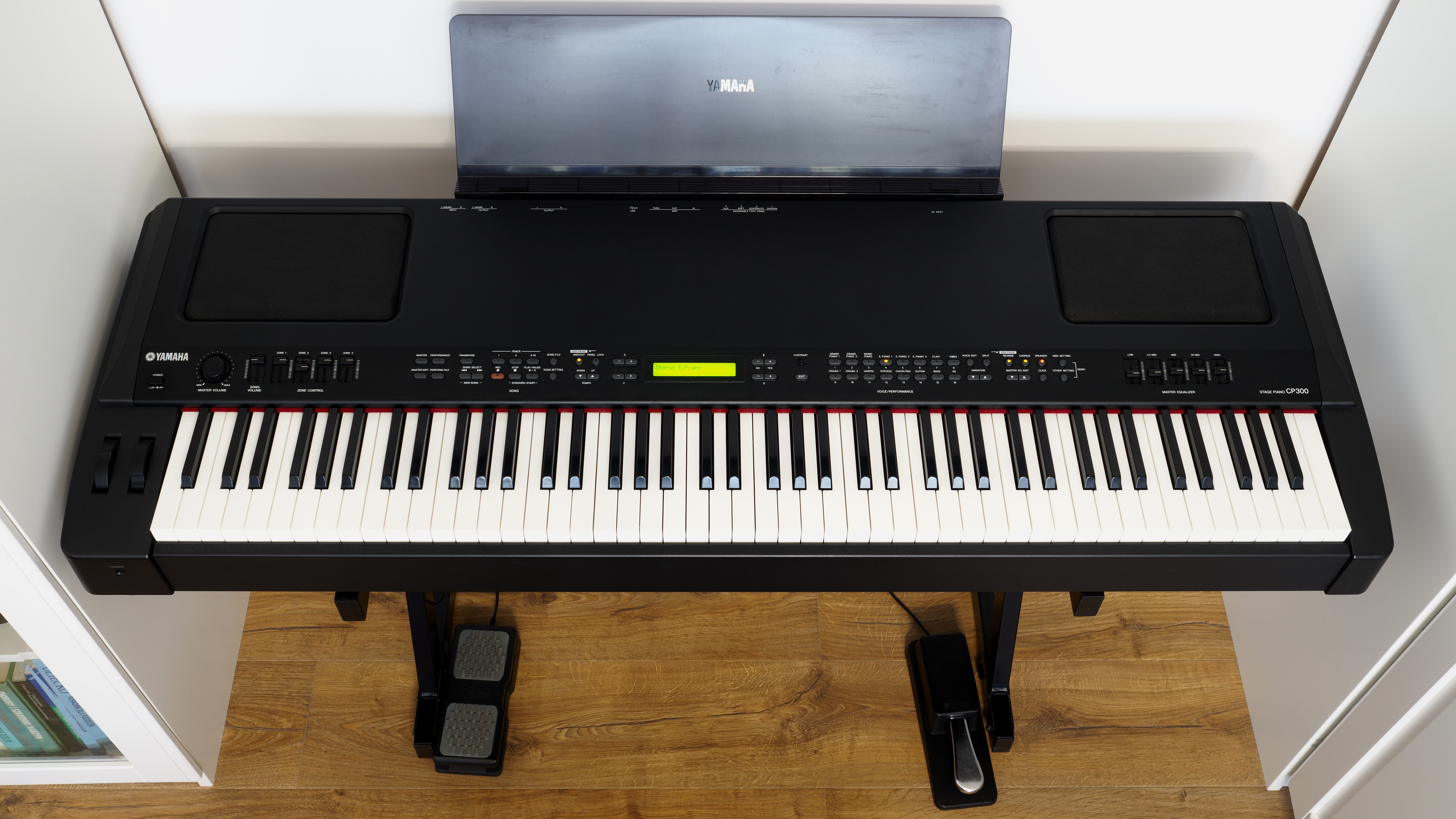
- Manufacturer: Yamaha Corporation
- Dates: 2006-2022

Technical specifications
- Polyphony: 128 notes
- Timbrality: 4-part multi-timbral, General MIDI compatible
- Synthesis type: PCM sample-based synthesis (Yamaha Advanced Wave Memory)

Input/output
- Keyboard: 88 keys

The Yamaha CP300 is a full-size digital stage piano with stereo speakers.

Introduced in 2006, the Yamaha CP300 offered similar specifications compared to the P250 it replaced. However, the primary sounds were significantly improved, including emulation of "half-pedaling" effects, as well as sympathetic string resonance. The addition of "C" in the name is an homage to the mid-1970s CP series of electric stage pianos. The success of the CP300 restarted the CP brand with other successful products in the series like the CP1 in 2009, Reface CP in 2015, and the CP88 in 2019.

The CP300 was discontinued in 2022 alongside the CP1, CP4, and CP40.

== Keyboard ==
The Yamaha CP300 has an 88-key "Graded Hammer" keyboard with action that Yamaha described in the manual of the instrument as "virtually indistinguishable from an actual acoustic piano".

A hammer action keyboard includes a mechanism that replicates that of an acoustic piano. This is achieved by the attachment of a physical lever system and hammers to add more resistance to the keys played. On top of this, the keys are individually weighted, with the lower keys heavier than the higher ones — that’s called graded weighting.

The keyboard is velocity-sensitive, including release velocity. It doesn't support aftertouch.

== Connectivity ==
The CP300 has onboard stereo speakers, a 1/4 inch jack headphone output, as well as a stereo pair of balanced XLR outputs for PA usage, and a stereo pair of unbalanced 1/4 inch jack outputs.

The instrument supports up to 4 assignable foot pedals, with their default functionality being sustain, sostenuto, soft, and expression, respectively.

The CP300 supports DIN MIDI input and output, as well as MIDI through a USB port. USB usage requires drivers as it's not an audio class-compliant device.

The instrument also allows for stereo audio input to be reproduced via its speakers.

== Sound generation ==
The CP300 is powered by the SWP50 tone generator that supports Advanced Wave Memory (AWM) dynamic stereo samples with 128 notes of polyphony. For the main grand piano sound, Yamaha digitally sampled each key in stereo at three attack intensities to obtain the tonal quality and presence, as well as key-off sounds, and hammer and damper noises of an acoustic piano. On top of this, the tone generator emulates sympathetic string resonance through its "soundboard" global effect. For non-grand piano sounds, other global effects like amp simulation, rotary speaker simulation, phaser, delay, tremolo, or auto panning can be used.

The tone generator also supports chorus of a few types, a couple of reverbs with controllable depth, and a master equalizer.

The instrument contains 50 original sounds, 480 XG sounds, and 12 drum kits.

== Notable users ==
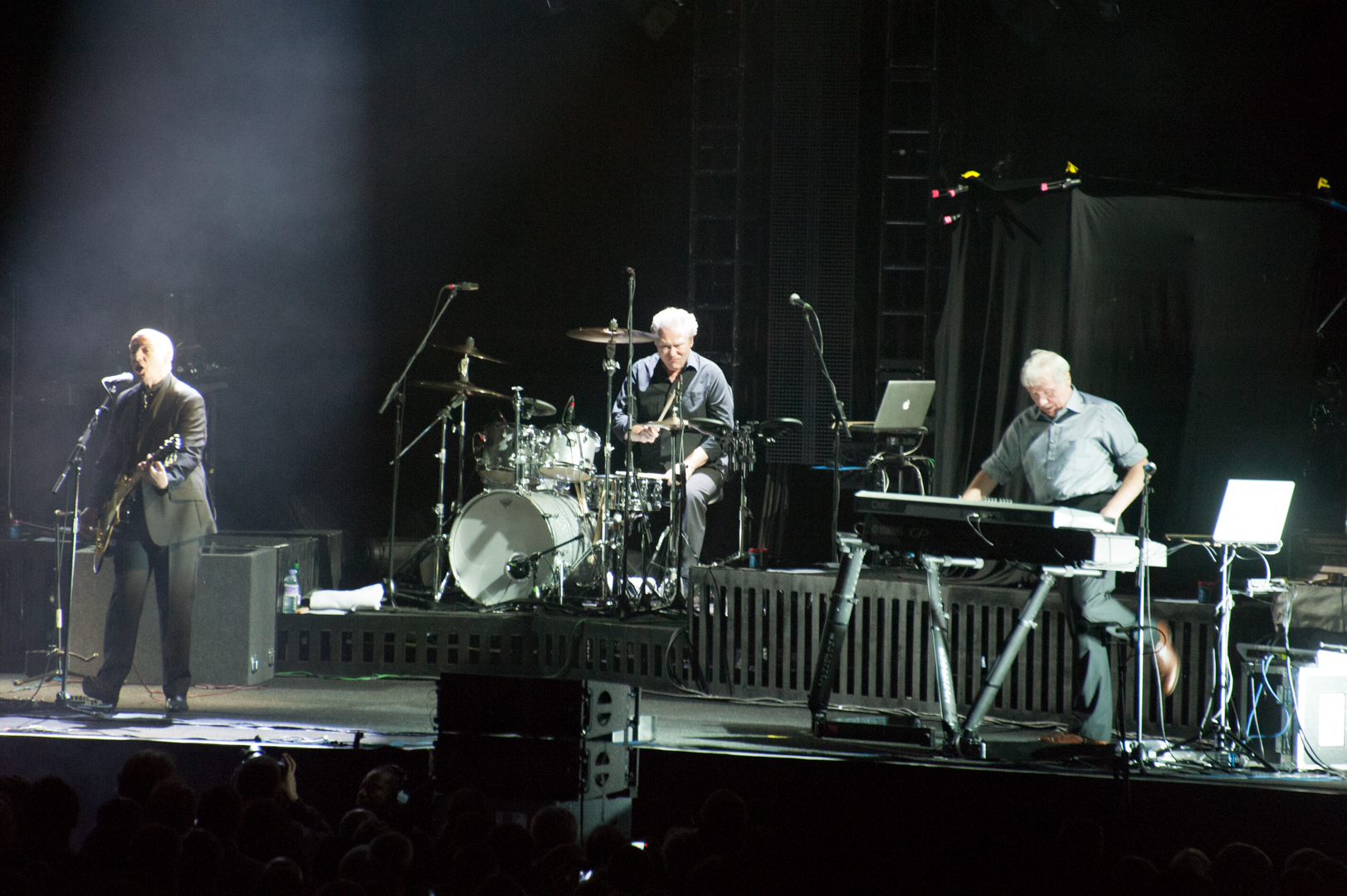
Ultravox performing at the O2 Arena in London, 2013

Rolling Stones touring keyboardist Chuck Leavell was playing a CP300 during the Beacon Theater concerts in New York City on October 29th and November 1st 2006, documented in the 2008 Martin Scorsese film "Shine a Light".

Annie Lennox performed with a CP300 at The Old Vic theatre in London during a gala on April 19 2015.

Eric Clapton's long-time keyboardist Chris Stainton used a CP300 at their May 16th 2009 concert at the Royal Albert Hall in London.

Marillion frontman Steve Hogarth played a CP300 during their "Marbles in the Park" concert on March 21st 2015 at Port Zélande in the Netherlands. Steve also used the CP300 solo at the Prog'Sud festival in France on May 16th 2015.

When Ultravox performed their last show (at the O2 Arena in London on November 30th 2013), their keyboardist and string player Billy Currie played a CP300.

Ólafur Arnalds performed with a CP300 at SXSW 2013 in Austin, Texas on March 14 2013.

Bo Burnham played a CP300 during the Homecoming Comedy Show at Ferris State University on September 23rd 2015.

Kodaline frontman Steve Garrigan performed with a CP300 in an exclusive album sampler for Red Bull in July 2016.
