= Red (Dia Frampton album) =

Studio album by Dia Frampton
- Released: December 6, 2011
- Recorded: 2011
- Genre: Pop
- Length: 35:58
- Label: Universal Republic
- Producers: Greg Kurstin; Greg Wells; Mark Foster; Busbee; J Bonilla; Isom Innis; Toby Gad; Ian Kirkpatrick; David Hodges; David Harris

Dia Frampton chronology
Red (2011)	Bruises (2017)

Singles from Red
- 1. "The Broken Ones" Released: November 15, 2011; 2. "Don't Kick the Chair" Released: 2012

Red is the debut studio album by American singer-songwriter Dia Frampton, released on December 6, 2011, by Universal Republic Records.

== Background and release ==
Frampton was a member of American rock band Meg & Dia along with her sister Meg and additional members Nicholas Price, Jonathan Snyder and Carlo Gimenez. After appearing on the first season of the American reality talent show The Voice, as a contestant (and eventual runner-up) in early 2011, Frampton began her career as a solo recording artist. The lead single, "The Broken Ones," was released on November 15, 2011. Frampton wrote and co-wrote every song on Red. Notable co-written songs include "Billy the Kid", which she wrote with Mark Foster and Isom Innis, lead singer and keyboard player for Foster the People respectively, "Hearts out to Dry," which she wrote with her sister, Meg, and "Bullseye," which she wrote with Isabella Summers, the keyboard player for Florence and the Machine.

== Critical reception ==
Red ratings
Aggregate scores
Source	Rating
Metacritic	74/100
Review scores
Source	Rating
Allmusic	3/5 stars
Alternative Press	4/5 stars
Entertainment Weekly	B
Sputnikmusic	3.5/5 stars

The album received positive reviews from music critics who highlighted the production, features and lyrics. Allmusic gave it a 3 out of 5 rating, stating, "Dia Frampton's 2011 major-label debut, Red, is a sweet, melodic, and pop-oriented affair that builds upon her second-place finish in the 2011 season of NBC's The Voice". They also complimented the country power ballad duet with Frampton's The Voice coach Blake Shelton, "the screwball dance-club oddity", "Billy the Kid" and various acoustic moments like the bittersweet "Daniel." Chuck Campbell of Honolulu Pulse claims "Although Frampton is consistently presented as an adorable sort, it sounds genuine enough that when she sings on closer "Trapeze", 'If I could tell you one thing, I'd tell you I'm not leaving', you hope she means it".

== Commercial performance ==
The album debuted at number one on the Billboard Top Heatseekers. It debuted at number 106 on the Billboard Top 200 Albums chart, selling a little over 10,000 copies in its first week. The album has also gone Gold in Thailand.

== Track listing ==
Red – Standard edition
No.	Title	Writer(s)	Producer(s)	Length
1.	"Don't Kick the Chair" (featuring Kid Cudi)	Dia Frampton; Scott Mescudi; Busbee; Julie Frost	Greg Kurstin	3:34
2.	"Isabella"	Frampton; Troy Verges; Brett James	Greg Wells	3:08
3.	"The Broken Ones"	Frampton; Ross Copperman; Tom Shapiro	Wells	4:14
4.	"Good Boy"	Frampton; Chris Seefried	Busbee; J Bonilla	3:00
5.	"I Will" (featuring Blake Shelton)	Frampton; Busbee; Shapiro	Busbee	3:28
6.	"Billy the Kid"	Frampton; Mark Foster; Isom Innis	Isom Innis; Mark Foster (co.)	3:47
7.	"Daniel"	Frampton; Toby Gad; Lindy Robbins	Toby Gad	3:35
8.	"Walk Away"	Frampton; Jimmy Harry; Fran Hall	Ian Kirkpatrick	4:14
9.	"Bullseye"	Frampton; Isabella Summers	Isabella "Machine" Summers	3:24
10.	"Trapeze"	Frampton; David Hodges; David Harris	David Hodges; David Ryan Harris (co.)	3:31
Total length:				35:55

Red – Apple Music edition
No.	Title	Writer(s)	Producer(s)	Length
11.	"Homeless"	Frampton; Danielle Brisebois; John Hill	Neal Avron	3:46
12.	"Hearts Out to Dry"	Frampton; Meg Frampton	Neal Avron	4:04
Total length:				43:45

Red – Walmart edition
No.	Title	Writer(s)	Producer(s)	Length
11.	"Love Can Come from Anywhere"	Frampton; Busbee	Busbee	3:26
12.	"Stairway to the Stars"	Frampton; Steve McEwan	Busbee; J Bonilla	2:49
Total length:				42:10

== Personnel ==
Credits were adapted from Allmusic.

- Nate Albert – A&R
- Neal Avron – mixing
- Chris Baldwin – cover photo, photography
- Sandy Brummels – art direction
- busbee – engineer, producer, vocal engineer, musician
- J Bonilla – producer
- Curt Schneider – bass
- Jerry McPherson – guitar
- Jonathan Berry – guitar
- Jon Smith – drums
- Steve Lu – string arrangements
- Martin Dodd – A&R
- Mark Foster – additional production, bass, keyboards, background vocals
- Dia Frampton – vocals
- Meg Frampton – musician, background vocals
- Toby Gad – engineer, mixing, producer
- Carlo Gimenez – musician
- Adam Halferty – background vocals
- David Ryan Harris – engineer, guitar, producer
- David Hodges – engineer, guitar, keyboards, producer
- Sean Hurley – bass
- Isom Innis – bass, drums, engineer, guitar, keyboards, percussion, producer, programming
- Ted Jensen – mastering
- Mike Kaminsky – management
- Ian Kirkpatrick – producer
- Greg Kurstin – engineer, producer
- Ian MacGregor – engineer
- Tom MacKay – A&R
- Manny Marroquin – mixing
- Nicholas Price – musician
- Zac Rae – keyboards
- Lynn M Scott – marketing
- Chris Seefried – background vocals
- Jesse Shatkin – engineer
- Daniel Silbert – inside photo, photography
- Olivia Smith – art direction, package design
- Jonathan Snyder – musician
- Aaron Sterling – drums
- Isabella Summers – engineer, producer
- Greg Wells – bass, drums, guitar, mixing, piano, producer, programming

== Charts ==
Chart performance for Red
Chart (2011)	Peak position
US Billboard 200	106
US Top Heatseekers Albums (Billboard)	1

== Certifications ==
Country	Certifications	Sales/shipments
Thailand	Gold	7.000
