= Here, Here and Here =

Studio album by Meg & Dia
- Released: April 21, 2009
- Genre: Pop rock
- Length: 48:00
- Labels: Warner; Sire
- Producer: Howard Benson

Meg & Dia chronology
If You're Poor Find Something to Sue Somebody For (2007)	Here, Here and Here (2009)	It's Always Stormy in Tillamook (2010)

Singles from Here, Here and Here
- 1. "Black Wedding" Released: February 3, 2009

Here, Here and Here is the third studio album by Meg & Dia. It was released by the Warner Bros. via Sire Records on April 21, 2009. In contrast to the band's previous release Something Real, Here, Here and Here minimally references literature. The sole exception is the track "Hug me" (née "Hug me till you drug me"), which was inspired by Brave New World. The eponymous closing track references a Mozart quote and narrative in which the composer points to his heart, mind and ears (here, here and here) in order to explain how he wrote his music.

Here, Here and Here debuted at number one on the Billboard Heatseekers Chart and number 103 on the top 200.

== Critical reception ==
Professional ratings
Review scores
Source	Rating
Allmusic	3/5 stars
Entertainment Weekly	(B−)

Andrew Leahey of AllMusic noted that Here, Here and Here expands Meg & Dia's sound by blending pop rock with emo elements and sexually frank lyrics.

== Track listing ==
Here, Here and Here track listing
No.	Title	Lyrics	Music	Length
1.	"Going Away"	Dia Frampton	Dia Frampton	3:25
2.	"Hug Me"	Dia Frampton	Dia Frampton	3:26
3.	"What If"	Meg Frampton; Dia Frampton	Meg Frampton	3:24
4.	"Are There Giants Too, in the Dance?"	Meg Frampton; Dia Frampton	Meg Frampton	3:23
5.	"Inside My Head"	Dia Frampton	Dia Frampton	4:24
6.	"Black Wedding"	Dia Frampton	Meg Frampton; Dia Frampton; Meg Squire	3:31
7.	"Bored of Your Love" (featuring Tom Higgenson)	Dia Frampton; Meg Frampton; T. Higgenson	Dia Frampton; Meg Frampton; T. Higgenson	3:02
8.	"One Sail"	Dia Frampton	Dia Frampton; Meg Frampton	4:20
9.	"The Last Great Star in Hollywood"	Dia Frampton; Meg Frampton	Meg Frampton	3:12
10.	"Agree to Disagree"	Meg Frampton	Meg Frampton	3:41
11.	"Fighting for Nothing"	Dia Frampton	Dia Frampton	4:25
12.	"Kiss You Goodnight"	Meg Frampton; Dia Frampton	Meg Frampton	4:07
13.	"Here, Here and Here"	Meg Frampton	Meg Frampton	4:14

Here, Here and Here iTunes bonus tracks
No.	Title	Length
14.	"What If (Remix)"	3:25

=== Notes ===
- Purchasing the album through MegandDia.com includes an instant download of "Agree to Disagree (GarageBand Demo)". The first 1,000 pre-orders also came with an additional autographed booklet. The band's official site offers an exclusive CD/DVD package which includes a 30-minute featurette documenting the making of the album
- "Let's Go Away," "Brightside," and "Giant" were all alternate titles to tracks 01, "Going Away", 09 "The Last Great Star in Hollywood", and 04, "Are There Giants Too, in the Dance?", respectively.
