= Yamaha P-115 =

Portable digital piano

P-115
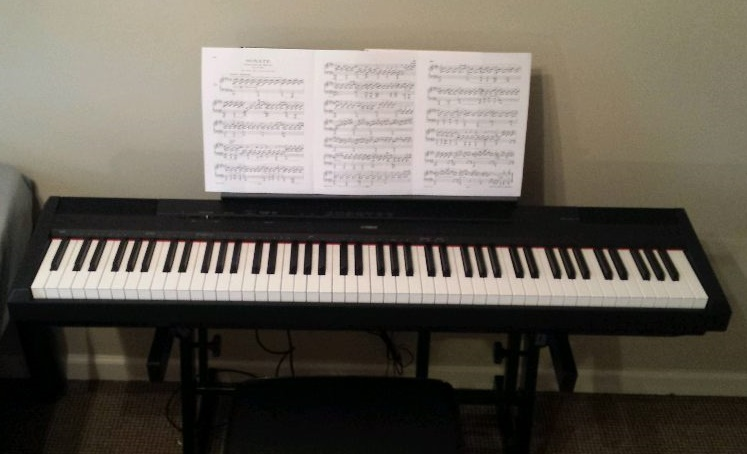
- Manufacturer: Yamaha
- Dates: 2015-2018
- Price: ~$600

Technical specifications
- Polyphony: 192
- Synthesis type: Sampler
- Velocity expression: Yes
- Storage memory: 100 KB

Input/output
- Keyboard: 88-key
- External control: USB to Host

The Yamaha P-115 is a portable digital piano introduced in 2015. It replaces its best-selling predecessor, the P-105.

The P-115 has 14 different voices which range from Grand Piano to Rock Organ, and comes pre-loaded with 64 preset songs. There is a built in metronome as well as a built in recorder which can store roughly 100 KB (11,000 notes) for play back or upload to an external device. Keys are Yamaha's Graded hammer standard (GHS) which range in weight from the low keys to high keys to more accurately mimic the feel of an acoustic piano. The overall weight of the keyboard is 26 pounds. The keyboard can come in colors black or white (p115B or p115WH).

== Features ==
- 64 preset songs (14 demo, 50 piano)
- USB to host line
- AUX out ([L/L+R][R])
- 2 6.3mm front-facing headphone jacks
- Pedal inputs to accommodate either a standard sustain pedal or Yamaha's LP-5 three pedal unit.

== See also ==
- Yamaha P-85
- Yamaha P-120
- Yamaha P-250
- List of Yamaha products
