= Cocoon (Meg & Dia album) =

Studio album by Meg & Dia
- Released: April 2011
- Genres: Indie pop; pop rock
- Label: Self-released

Meg & Dia chronology
It's Always Stormy in Tillamook (2010)	Cocoon (2011)

Cocoon is the fourth studio album by Meg & Dia. It was released independently in April 2011.

== Track listing ==
No.	Title	Length
1.	"Love Is"	3:51
2.	"Bandits"	4:14
3.	"Unsinkable Ships"	2:20
4.	"Breakdown"	3:55
5.	"Mary Ann"	3:22
6.	"Better Off"	3:56
7.	"Said And Done"	1:46
8.	"Summer Clothes"	3:10
9.	"Separate"	5:25
10.	"I Need You In It"	2:55
11.	"Teddy Loves Her"	5:11
