= Yamaha P-85 =

Entry-level digital piano

P-85
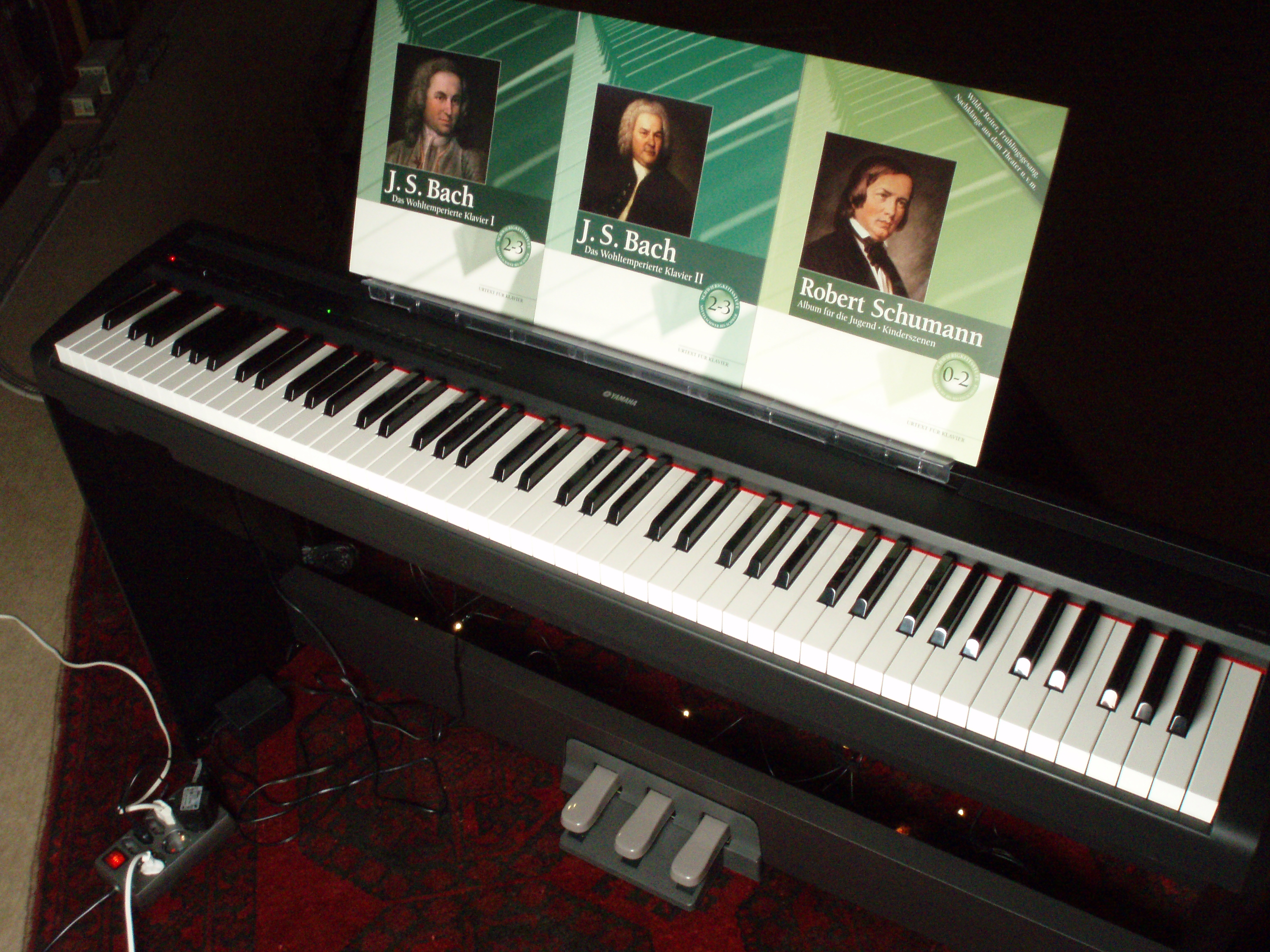
- P-85 with L-85 wooden stand and LP-5 three-pedal unit
- Manufacturer: Yamaha
- Dates: 2007–2010
- Price: ~$600

Technical specifications
- Polyphony: 64
- Timbrality: Multitimbral
- Synthesis type: Sampler
- Aftertouch expression: no
- Velocity expression: yes

Input/output
- Keyboard: 88-key
- External control: MIDI

The Yamaha P-85 is an entry-level digital piano introduced in 2007. It is the successor of the Yamaha P-70 and introduces a MIDI sequencer.

The P-85 features 10 different patches (2 acoustic pianos, 2 electric pianos, 2 harpsichords, 2 church organs, strings, and vibes), some of which are in stereo and use multi-sampling. The action used is Yamaha's GHS (Graded Hammer Standard). The P-85 weighs about 25 lbs (11.6 kg) and has two 6.3 mm headphone jacks in the front. It can be used in conjunction with the L-85 wooden stand and the LP-5 three-pedal unit.

The P-85 is alternatively also available in silver (P-85S) instead of black. The successor to the P-85 is the Yamaha P-95, introduced in 2010.

== Support ==
The P-85 is now replaced by a newer model and parts and service are no longer supported. However a service manual is online with detailed schematics as well as a well-marked PCB to allow anyone with some electronics background to resolve basic problems as the products age.

== Features ==
- 50 built-demo songs and 10 patch demos
- MIDI sequencer, capacity about 11,000 notes
- Half-pedaling support; metronome; reverb; layering
- 20 W power consumption
- 6 W amplifiers

== See also ==
- Yamaha P-115
- Yamaha P-120
- Yamaha P-250
