= Something Real (Meg & Dia album) =

Studio album by Meg & Dia
- Released: August 8, 2006
- Studios: Fluxwave Music, Los Angeles
- Genres: Indie pop; emo pop
- Length: 36:09
- Labels: Doghouse; Warner
- Producers: Stacy Jones; Bill Lefler

Meg & Dia chronology
What Is It? A Fender Bender (2006)	Something Real (2006)	Warped Tour Sessions (2006)

Professional ratings
Review scores
Source	Rating
AllMusic	3/5 stars
Okayplayer	3/5 stars

Something Real is the second studio album by Meg & Dia, released on August 8, 2006. After signing with Doghouse Records the previous fall, they started recording in January. It contains new songs and electrified versions of their originally acoustic songs. Many are inspired by books such as East of Eden, Rebecca and Indiana. It peaked at 12 on the Billboard Heatseekers Chart.

== Track listing ==
All lyrics by Meg and Dia Frampton and music by Meg Frampton, except 5, 6 and 9 (entirely by Meg):

1. "Monster" – 2:43
2. "Roses" – 3:28
3. "Tell Mary" – 3:47
4. "Indiana" – 2:47
5. "Masterpiece" – 3:29
6. "Rebecca" – 3:24
7. "Nineteen Stars" – 3:26
8. "Cardigan Weather" – 2:55
9. "Getaways Turned Holidays" – 4:03
10. "Courage, Robert" – 2:55
11. "Setting Up Sunday" – 4:04
12. "Monster (Acoustic iTunes Bonus Track)" – 2:42
