= Stage piano =

Electronic musical instrument

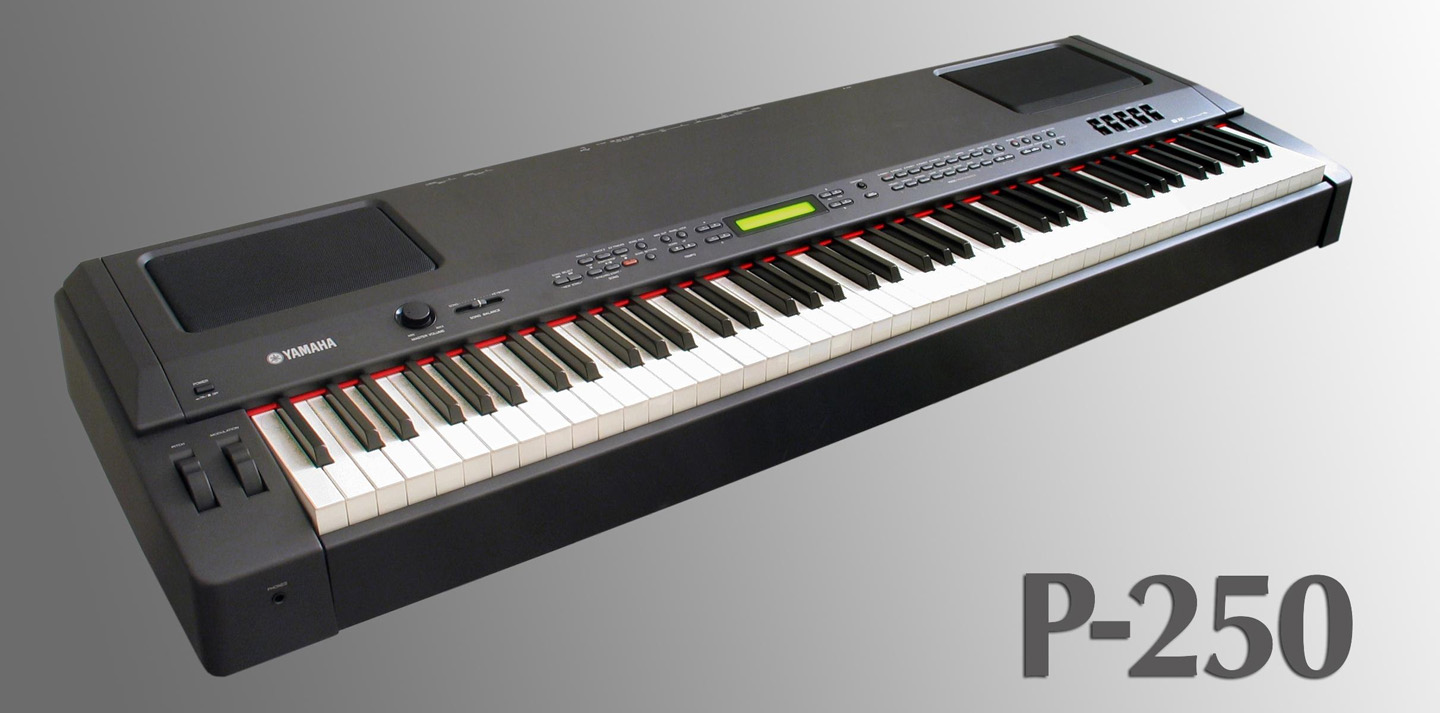
Yamaha P-250 – a digital stage piano. This piano is unusual in that it contains built-in powered speakers

A stage piano is an electronic musical instrument designed for use in live performances on stage or in a studio, as well as for music recording in Jazz and popular music. While stage pianos share some of the same features as digital pianos designed for home use and synthesizers, they have a number of features which set them apart. Stage pianos usually provide a smaller number of sounds (usually acoustic piano, electric piano, and hammond organ), with these being of higher quality than the ones found on regular digital pianos and home synthesizers.

Unlike many digital pianos, which are designed for semi-permanent installation in a private home and have design elements which make regular transportation difficult (e.g., permanently mounted legs, modesty panel, internal power amplifier and speakers, and a fixed sustain pedal), a stage piano generally has a portable, detachable stand, no internal amp or speakers (an output jack is provided so the instrument can be plugged into a keyboard amplifier), a detachable sustain pedal to be plugged into a jack, and a robust body. This enables a performer to remove all of the detachable parts and makes the instrument easier to transport to gigs and rehearsals.

== Controls and features ==
The sounds of a high-end stage piano are usually created through sampling or complex digital signal processing-modelling, methods of higher quality compared to what is commonly found on digital keyboards, which use relatively simple synthesis methods to allow for more, different types of sounds, albeit in lower quality. Along with the sounds of the most common keyboard instruments, most stage pianos also provide a recreation of electro-mechanical pianos like the Fender Rhodes, Wurlitzer 200A, or Yamaha CP-70/CP-80 series, which were based on picking up the sound of a metal tine, reed or string hit by a hammer.

While almost all digital pianos and lower-end synthesizer keyboards designed for home use have small onboard powered speakers, stage pianos are often designed without onboard speakers; instead, they are designed to be used with external amplification. In some models, low-powered speakers built into the instrument are present and are intended for home use; however, in case of live performances more powerful and higher-quality amplifiers are preferred, plugging them through the output jack. Only some particular models of stage pianos, such as the Yamaha P-250 or Casio Privia, have onboard powered speakers already built into the instrument.

The controls on stage pianos can usually be navigated through knobs and buttons placed on the instrument. Among these, MIDI interfaces are provided to permit them to be used as master keyboards, which can control other tone-generating modules, such as Hammond organ-emulators or synthesizer string modules.

== Keyboards ==
Most digital stage pianos have weighted keys or semi-weighted keys.

Fully weighted keys are designed to replicate the weight and playing action of acoustic piano hammer-action keys. They have a piano-like feel and better touch control.
Semi-weighted keys are lighter and cheaper to manufacture than fully weighted keys. They give less control and are less similar to an acoustic piano, but can be played more quickly by most people.

Stage pianos usually have 88 keys, which is standard for all modern acoustic pianos. However, some stage pianos have fewer keys, such as the Kurzweil SP76 which has only 76 semi-weighted keys, but is still called a stage piano because of its layout and weighted keys.

== Common stage pianos ==
- Casio Privia line: Contains high-quality instrument sampled data, such as four-layer samples (more expression of tone for varying velocities) for the pianos. They have 88 weighted keys, tuning control, and 128-voice polyphony, amongst other features. The Privia family is equipped with 16-watt onboard speakers in almost all models, except for PX-3 and PX-5S models. Earlier Privia models use Zygotech synthesis engine, while newer models utilizes Casio's new Linear Morphing Technology.
- Nord Stage line: Produces organ, piano, and synthesizer sounds. Available in 76 or 88 weighted-key models, as well as a semi-weighted model for reduced weight.
- Clavia Nord Electro 3: Sold in 61 or 73-key semi-weighted action models. Produces organ and piano sounds, but also other sounds from the Nord Piano Library and Nord Sample Library.
- Korg SP-series: Features 88 fully weighted keys with RH3 (Responsive Hammer 3) action with 3x10 tone banks. It also has a pair of 11-watt built-in speakers suitable for relatively small performance venues.
- Kurzweil SP88X: Has 76 and 88-key semi-weighted action models, and an 88-key fully weighted action model. Its sounds include pianos, various Hammond-organ sounds, and synthesizer string sounds.
- Kurzweil SP3X: Contains 512 preset sounds, 128 effects, 60 rhythm patterns and weighted keyboard action that is velocity and aftertouch-sensitive. It has 88 keys and 64-note polyphony
- Roland RD series (RD-150, RD-300SX, RD-700 etc.): The keyboard has a full-weighted 88-key keyboard with graded hammer action. It uses high quality acoustic, electric and Rhodes piano samples, additionally providing other lead and backing instruments (e.g. clavinet, electric and acoustic bass, string/synth pads, and vocal effects). It is designed for live use, and the operation panel includes the most used functions to avoid on-screen menus.
- Yamaha P-250 and CP300: Digital stage piano designed for professional live performance or for use as a studio instrument. Includes natural stereo grand piano, harpsichord, vintage electric piano and acoustic church organ samples, 88-key Graded Hammer (GH) action, MIDI-controller capability, and on-board 2x30W amped speakers, suitable for middle performance venues..
- Yamaha CP33: This series of stage piano was first introduced in 1976. It has an 88-key Graded Hammer keyboard action, 28 voices, and MIDI master keyboard controller capability.
- M-Audio ProKeys 88: Has 88 hammer-action keys, a stereo grand piano sound, 14 other instrument sounds, and MIDI controller functionality.
- Korg SP250: Features 88 fully weighted keys, MIDI controller functionality, and a total of 30 piano, organ, string, and pad sounds. Designed for touring, it is barely more than twice the size of the keyboard itself.
- Yamaha CP4 Stage: The latest version of Yamaha's CP line of professional stage pianos. Includes revamped stereo piano samples, 88-key Graded Hammer (GH) action, MIDI-controller capability, and new sound engine based on the home-focused Clavinova digital pianos.
- Kawai MP7: Kawai's first model of stage piano. Also features 88 weighted keys with stereo piano samples powered by Harmonic Imaging Technology.
