= Yamaha P-250 =

Digital stage piano

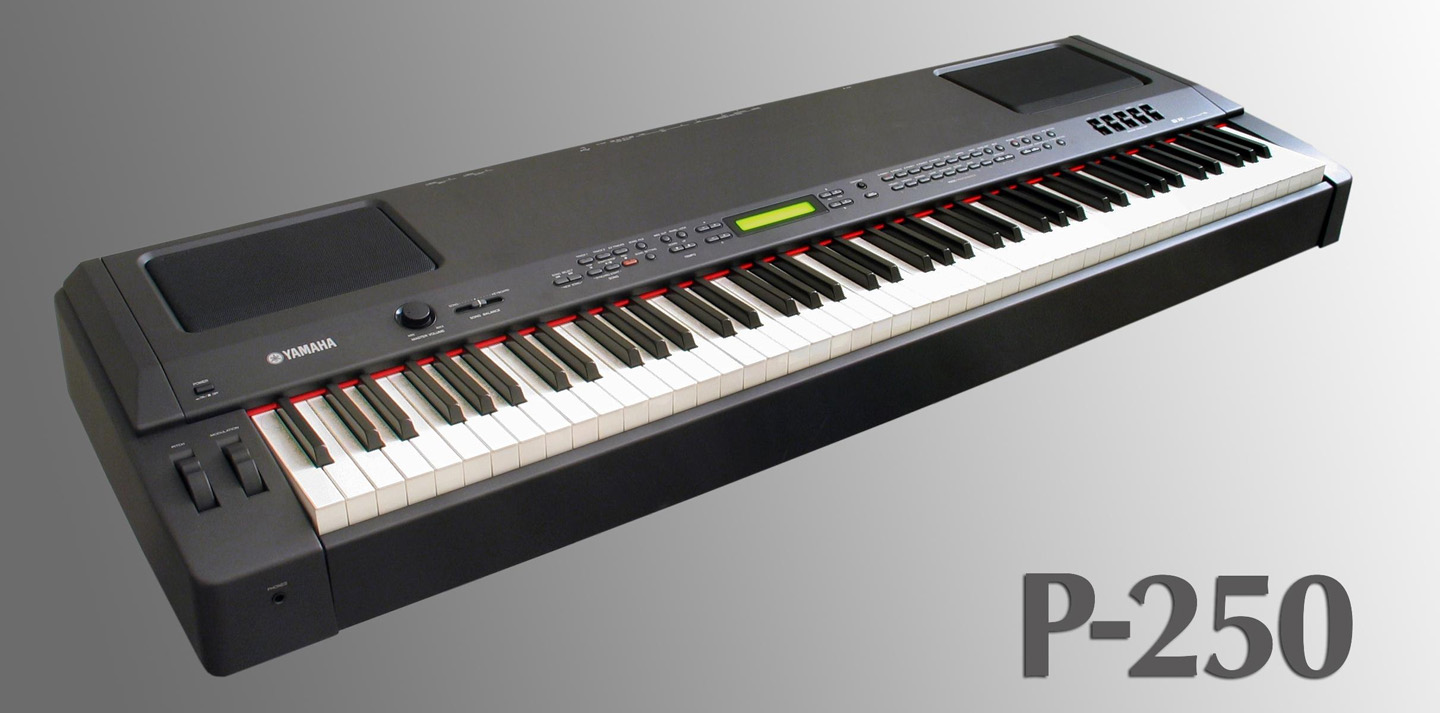
Yamaha P-250 digital piano

The Yamaha P-250 is a digital stage piano. It was announced in mid-2003 as a replacement for the Yamaha P-200 and went to market shortly thereafter.

The P-250 features various stereo piano samples, plus hundreds of other MIDI, General MIDI and XG sounds. It features 88 progressively-weighted keys, plus a built-in amplifier driving the on-board stereo speakers. It weighs approximately 70 lbs (32 kg).

The P-250 was discontinued by the manufacturer and replaced with the Yamaha CP300. The Yamaha CP300 looks almost identical to the P250, but features some modifications in sounds, and the addition of performance sliders.

This piano is known to be preferred by Regina Spektor to play "Dance Anthem of the 80's" during her live concerts.

== See also ==
- Yamaha P-85
- Yamaha P-115
- Yamaha P-120
