= Privia =

Line of digital and stage pianos

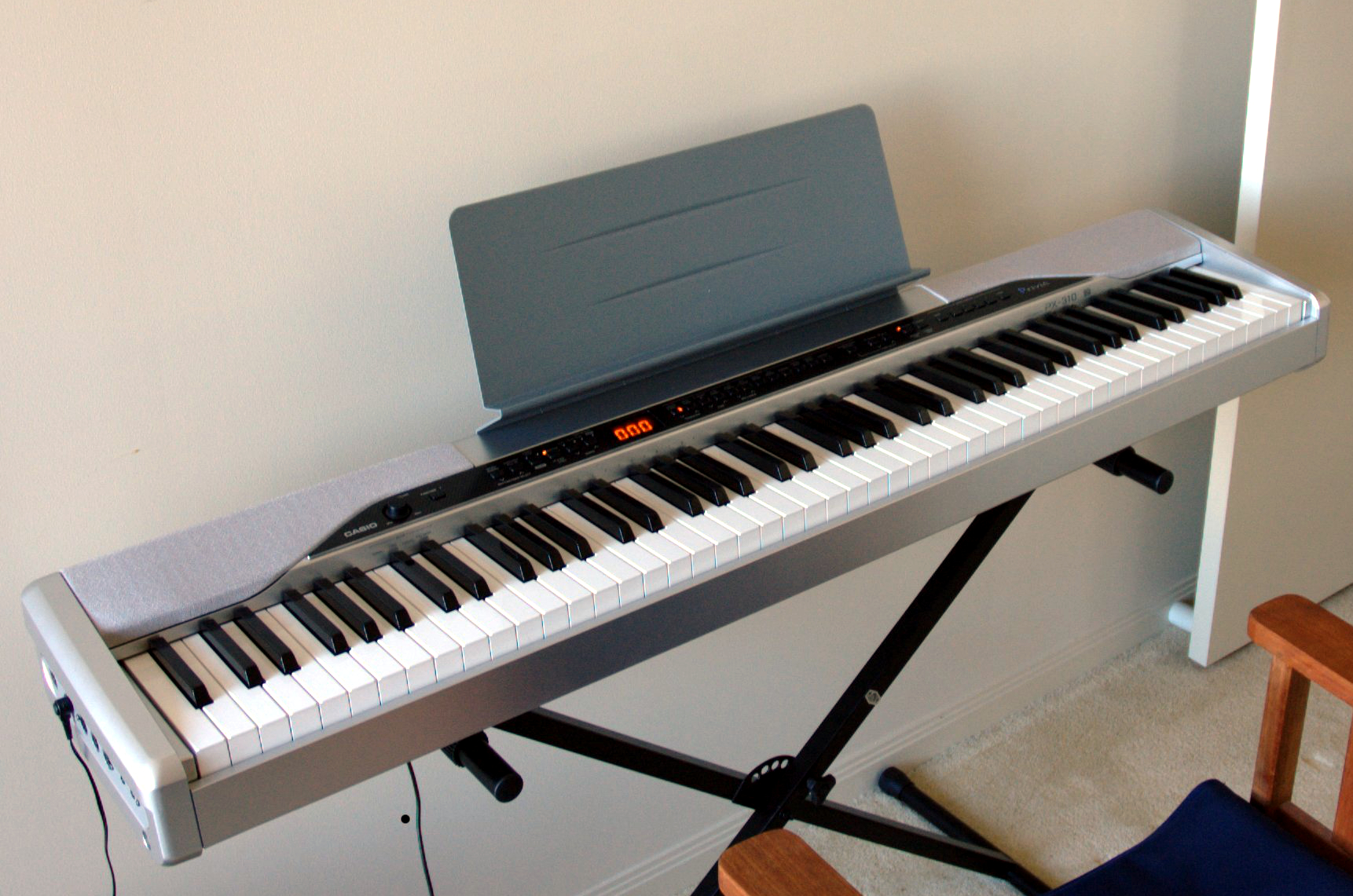
- Privia PX-310 Compact Digital Piano
- Manufacturer: Casio
- Dates: 2003 – present
- Price: US$ 699–1599+ (depending on model)

Technical specifications
- Polyphony: 32 (ZPI models); 128-256 (AiF and AiR models)
- Timbrality: Multitimbral
- Synthesis type: Sampling: ZPI synthesis (2003-2009); Linear Morphing AiF/AiR Sound Engine (2009-present)
- Aftertouch expression: yes (PX-860 and PX-870)
- Velocity expression: yes
- Storage memory: SD card (2005–2009); USB flash drive (2009–present)

Input/output
- Keyboard: 88 keys with weighted hammer action and simulated key weight
- External control: MIDI

The Privia is a line of digital pianos and stage pianos manufactured by Casio. They have 4-layer stereo piano samples and up to 256 notes of polyphony, depending on model. All Privia models feature some kind of weighted keyboard action which simulates the action on an acoustic piano.

First introduced in 2003, the Privia was originally designed to be a new competitor to other brands like Yamaha, Roland, and Kawai in budget digital piano products, but since then more exclusive pianos has been added to the line as well.

== Overview ==
The original Privia was introduced by Casio in 2003 as a new concept within budget digital pianos. It is known for offering more advanced features and high-quality sound at affordable prices, comparable with more expensive instruments. The first Privia was the PX-100. Like any other compact digital pianos, it was able to be played on a table or optional stand, and was equipped with a digital sound source created by independent sampling of various piano timbres.

The first generation Privia was produced from 2003 to 2006. It utilized the Zygotech Polynomial Interpolation (ZPI) synthesis sound engine, as used in Casio's former flagship keyboards. The second generation followed from 2006 to 2009, using a similar sound engine.

The third generation was introduced in 2009, featuring an all new Linear Morphing AiF (Acoustic and Intelligent Filtering) sound engine with four-level dynamic stereo piano sampling and 128-note polyphony.

The fourth generation is the current version of the Privia, first introduced in 2012 . It uses the improved rendition of Linear Morphing AiF engine, called Multi-Dimensional Acoustic and Intelligent Resonator (AiR) sound engine, featuring a revamped 4-layer sampling and new features such as simulated sympathetic resonance, adjustable key sensor response (referred to as "Hammer Response"), half-damper effect, pedal noises and key-off simulation.

A minor update of the fourth generation was introduced in 2015. Some models included a color touchscreen and improved built-in speaker system, as well as updated various features with a few models having up to 256-note polyphony.

== Keyboard action ==
As with other digital pianos, the Privia features a fully weighted keyboard action to simulate the action on an acoustic piano.

This key action consists of a mechanical system of small "hammers" and weights attached to each key that will lift up when the key is pressed, while the keys trigger the sensors to generate sound. The sensors are located in the bottom of the keyboard, similar to that of a synthesizer keyboard action

Throughout various incarnations, the key action has undergone several changes over time:

=== Scaled Hammer Action (2003–2008 models) ===
The original keyboard action, featuring a single or double sensors installed below the keybed. The weights are attached far back to the keys, giving it a slight resistance after the keys are released. It also has a simulated weight in which lower notes are heavier than higher ones.

=== Tri-Sensor Scaled Hammer Action (2009–2011 models) ===
Tri-Sensor Scaled Hammer utilizes three individual sensors for each keys, two installed below the key's base, and one installed slightly further back near the hammers. The hammers are also modified to have less resistance and swing back faster upon release. The three sensors ensure precision response and improved touch sensitivity compared to its predecessor.

=== Tri-Sensor Scaled Hammer Action II (2012–present models) ===
A revamped incarnation of the previous action. The triple sensors are now installed right below the key's base, while the hammers remain unchanged. Furthermore, this action even features unique keys with simulated synthetic ebony and ivory texture and the sensor's response can be digitally adjusted to match the playing style realistically.

The Scaled Hammer Action II has been described as being harder, more substantial and heavier compared to the previous versions. It is also widely criticized for its characteristic knocking noises when played at medium to high velocities, and considered as being heavier than a generic acoustic piano keys.

=== Smart Scaled Hammer Action (2019–present models) ===
Reduces size and weight without compromising playing feel. Included in PX-S1000 and PX-S3000 models and the new 2021 models, PX-S1100 and PX-S3100.

=== Smart Hybrid Hammer Action (2022–present models) ===
Included in PX-S5000, PX-S6000 and PX-S7000.

== Models ==
Models currently sold in black.

=== Console models ===
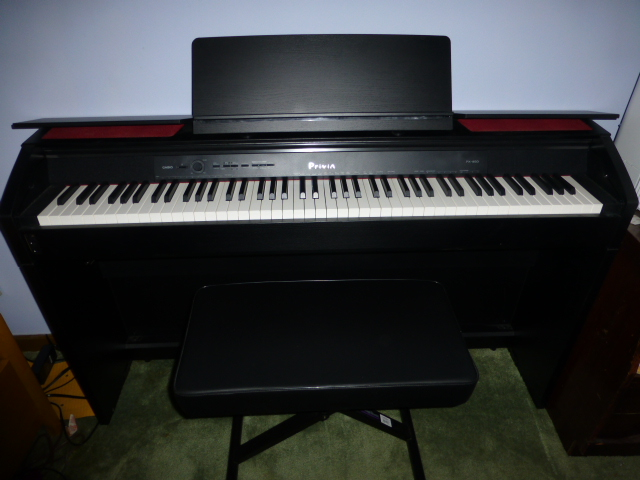
Privia PX-850 (2012)

- 2006 : PX-700
- 2007 : PX-720
- 2008 : PX-800
- 2009 : PX-730
- 2010 : PX-830
- 2012 : PX-750; PX-780 and PX-850
- 2013 : PX-A800
- 2015 : PX-760 and PX-860
- 2017 : PX-770 and PX-870

=== Standard models ===
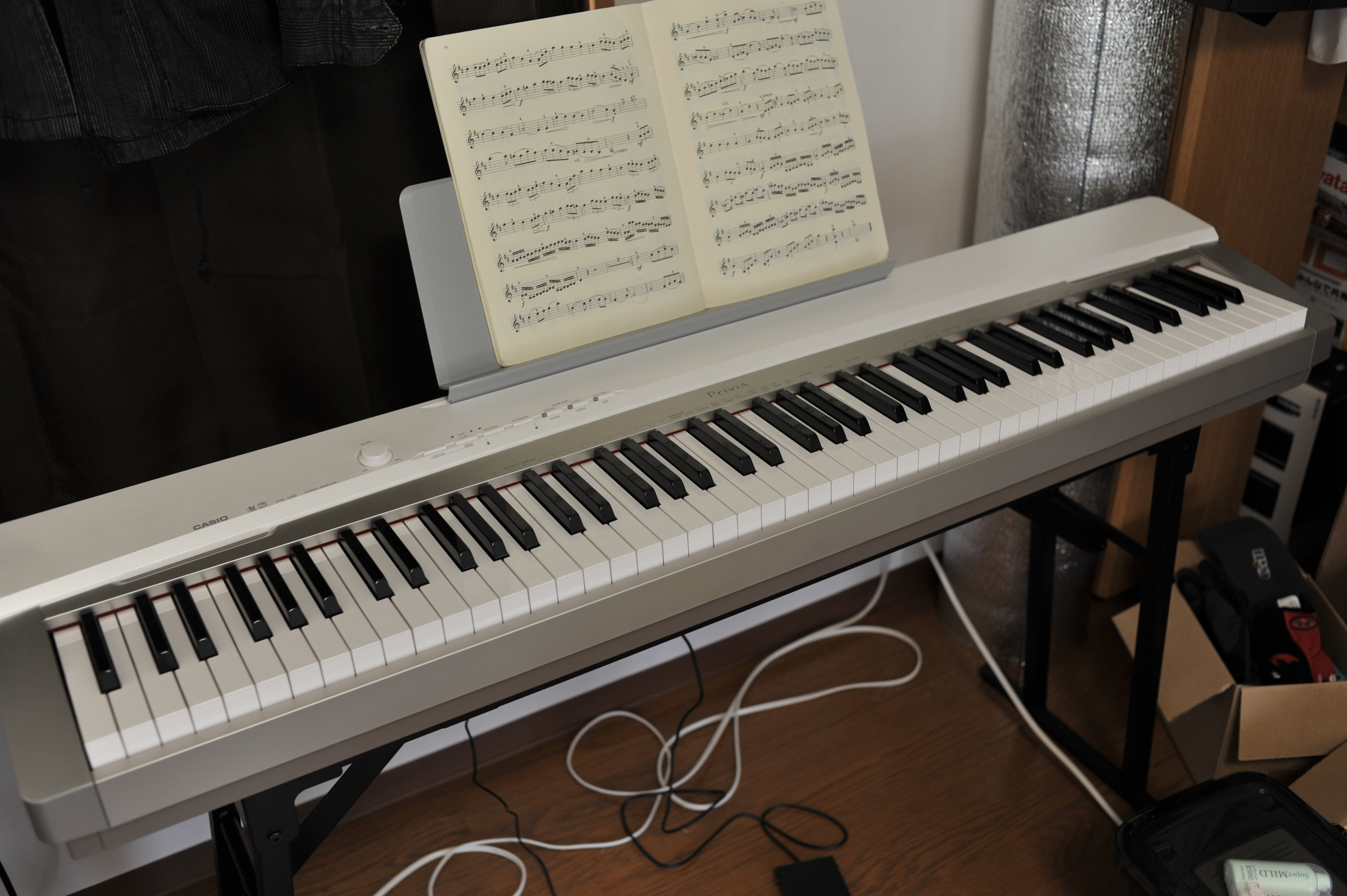
Privia PX-130 (2009)

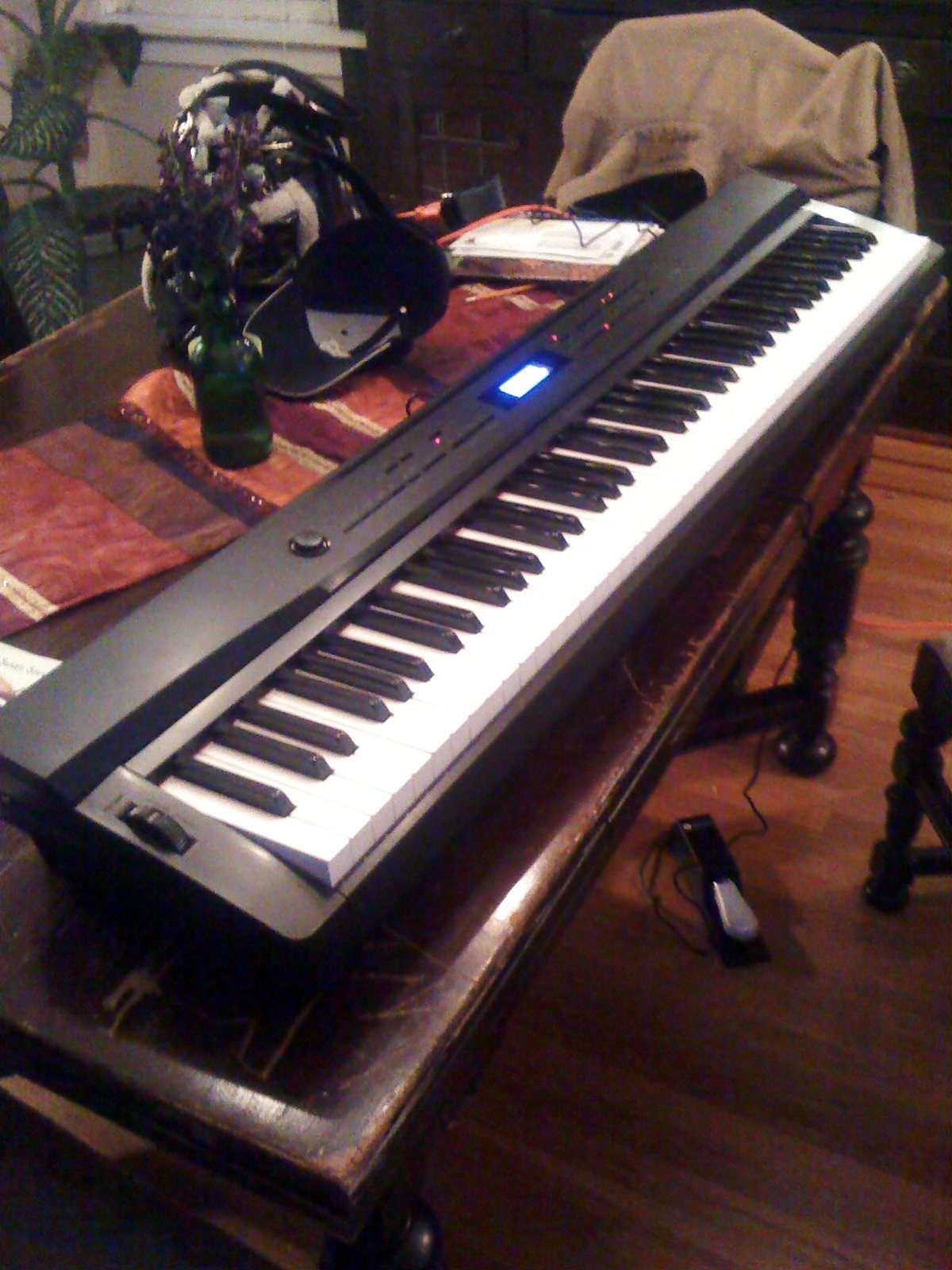
Privia PX-330 (2009)

- 2003 : PX-100 – the original Privia, with Dual-Element HL sound engine
- 2004 : PX-400R – first Privia with LCD and auto-accompaniment capabilities
- 2005 : PX-110 – first model with ZPI Synthesis sound engine
- 2005 : PX-310
- 2005 : PX-500L - First model with key LEDS.
- 2006 : PX-300
- 2007 : PX-200 – first entry-level Privia model with AiF sound engine
- 2007 : PX-320 – first Privia model with AiF sound engine
- 2007 : PX-410R – minor upgrade to the PX-400R
- 2007/08 : PX-120
- 2008 : PX-575 – the last Privia model with ZPI sound engine
- 2009 : PX-330 – first Privia model with Linear Morphing; introducing dot-matrix LCD, replacing the digital alphanumeric display as seen on PX-410R and PX-575
- 2009/10 : PX-130/PX-135BK/WE – first entry-level model with Linear Morphing
- 2012 : PX-350M – successor to the PX-330, Features the same dot matrix display, new improved 4 layer stereo piano tones with AiR sound engine, a 16 track recorder and new accompaniment capabilities.
- 2012 : PX-150 – successor to the PX-130/135 with enhanced sampling system and the first model with the present AiR sound engine
- 2013 : PX-A100 – Privia 10th Anniversary model, based on the PX-150 and available in red or blue color
- 2015 : PX-160 – successor to the PX-150; minor improvements with enhanced sounds
- 2015 : PX-360M/CGP-700 – Successor to the PX-350M; features a color touch screen and improved sounds from its predecessors, with a new proprietary Multi-Expressive Intelligence (MXi) sound engine in collaboration with the default AiR engine, as well as revamped built-in speakers.
- 2019 : PX-S1000 and PX-S3000
- 2021 : PX-S1100 and PX-S3100
- 2022: PX-S5000, PX-S6000 and PX-S7000

The CGP-700 includes a unique stand equipped with built-in amplification and speakers.

The MXi sound engine was later used for Casio's latest MZ-X series of keyboard/synthesizer hybrid instrument, introduced in early 2016

Note: the CGP-700 (2015 model) and PX-A100/A800 Anniversary series (2013 model) were offered only in Japan and Western markets, and not available in other regions.

=== Stage pianos (Privia PRO series) ===
- 2010 : PX-7WE
- 2011 : PX-3BK/WH – Casio's first-ever stage piano model
- 2013 : PX-5S – stage ready variation of the PX-350, the PX-5S adds tone editing and controller capabilities and a new Ivory Touch keybed. The internal speakers and accompaniment were removed to a facilitate the new features. The PX-5S weighs under 25 lbs., holding the distinction of being the lightest stage piano ever manufactured.
- 2015 : PX-560M – stage ready variation of the PX-360 and CGP-700, featuring the same color touch screen and auto-accompaniment function, but added synthesizer control, Hex Layers (tones with up to 6 simultaneous instruments) and sound editing capabilities, similar to that of PX-5S. Unlike the PX-5S, this model is equipped with built-in speakers.

== Footnotes ==
- "Privia – Product archive". Casio. (see Technical Specifications tab on each product)
