= Cotillion (disambiguation) =

Cotillion is an 18–19th century French dance.

Cotillion may also refer to:

- Cotillions (album), a Billy Corgan album
- Cotillion (Malazan), a character in the Malazan Book of the Fallen series
- Cotillion (novel), a 1953 Regency novel by Georgette Heyer
- Cotillion ball, a formal presentation of young ladies, debutantes, to polite society
- Cotillion Ballroom, a music venue in Wichita, Kansas
- Cotillion Hall, a historic dance hall in Portland, Oregon, United States
- Cotillion Handicap, an annual American Thoroughbred horse race in Bensalem, Pennsylvania
- Cotillion Records, a record label
- HMS Cotillion, a name of several Royal Navy ships
- Cotillion, a model of Lowrey organ: List of Lowrey organs § Cotillion
