= G101 =

G101 may refer to:

- China National Highway 101, a major trunk route in China
- R-1820-G101, a model of the Wright R-1820 aircraft engine
- the former on-air moniker of WFGE, a radio station licensed to State College, Pennsylvania, USA

G-101 may refer to:

- Gibson G-101, a model of combo organ

G 101 may refer to:

- G 101 (glider), a designation for a Swedish military glider in use from 1942 to 1953
