= Doric Organ =

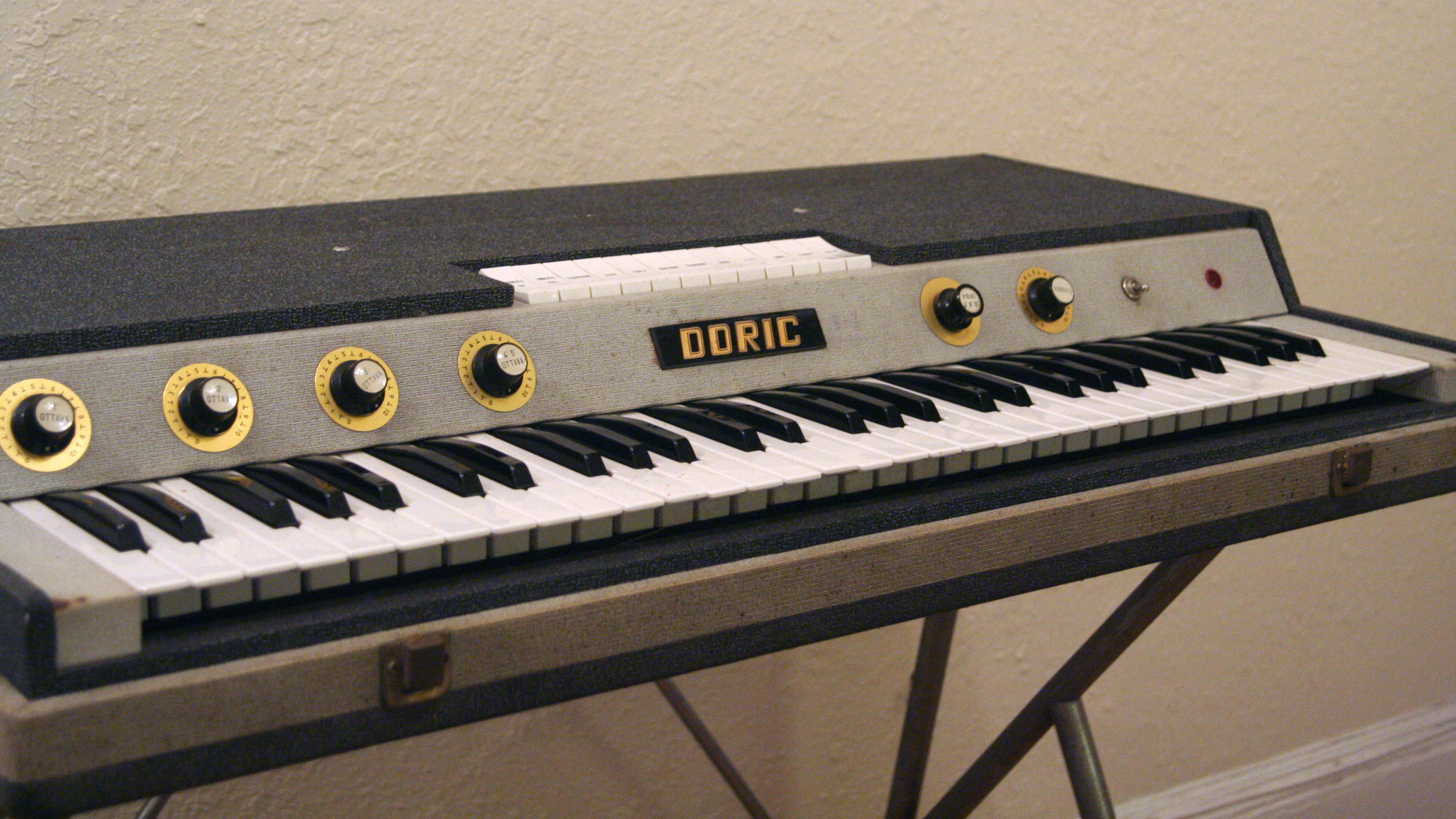
Doric Combo Organ

The Doric Transistorized Organ is a model of combo organ produced in Italy in the 1960s.

== History ==
Doric organs were also sold under the brand name Ekosonic and were marketed as being the "lightest on the market" at 30 pounds (14 kg). Much like early Farfisa combo organs, Doric organs featured a monophonic bass section and a polyphonic lead which emulated other instruments by using transistor oscillators and a frequency divider section. The Doric never achieved the same fame as Farfisa and Vox organs, perhaps due to limited distribution and a lower price point.

== Features ==
The Doric 61TT featured controls activating

- Vibrato On
- Vibrato Full
- Saxophone
- Horn
- Viola
- Diapason
- Trombone
- Reed
- Flute
- Oboe
- Cornet
- Violin

The control for stops operates like a pipe organ, in a push-pull manner, activating 4', 8', and 16' stops.

== Power Plug ==
Although the Doric organs sold in the United States operated on standard 120 V power, the cable connecting the unit to a wall was unique, and, as a result, many organs are sold without plugs and users are forced to either replace the jack with an IEC standard, fashion a plug from appliance cords, or buy expensive vintage cables. The power supply that the jack connects to converts household current to 9 V DC.

== Operation ==
Inside the Doric is a line of circuits labeled with the syllables of solfege, each generating a given tone in a scale. At the far left is a single circuit for the bass notes which shares a circuit board with the solid-state vibrato mechanism. As with many organs of the same vintage, Doric organs often have problems with electrolytic capacitors which overflow or burn out over time.
