= Lowrey organ =

Electronic organ

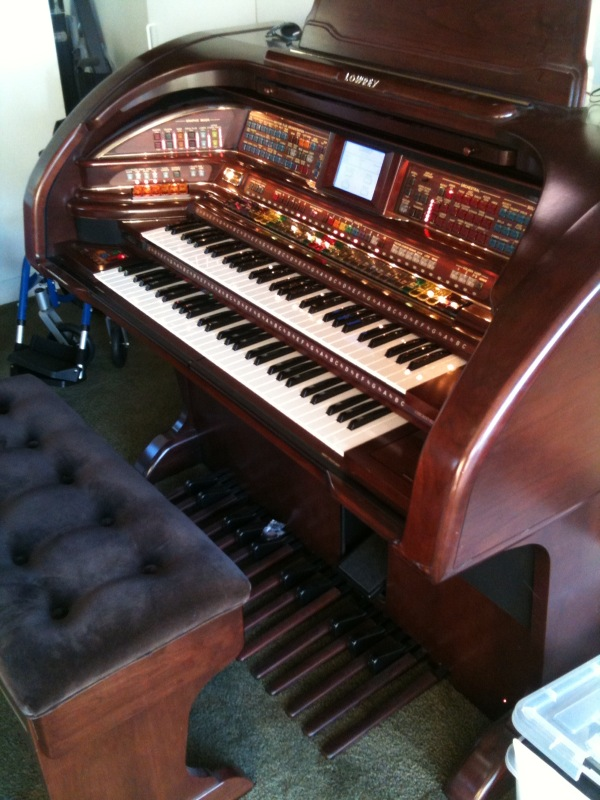
A Lowrey Royale SU500 / Palladium 630 organ (high end model)

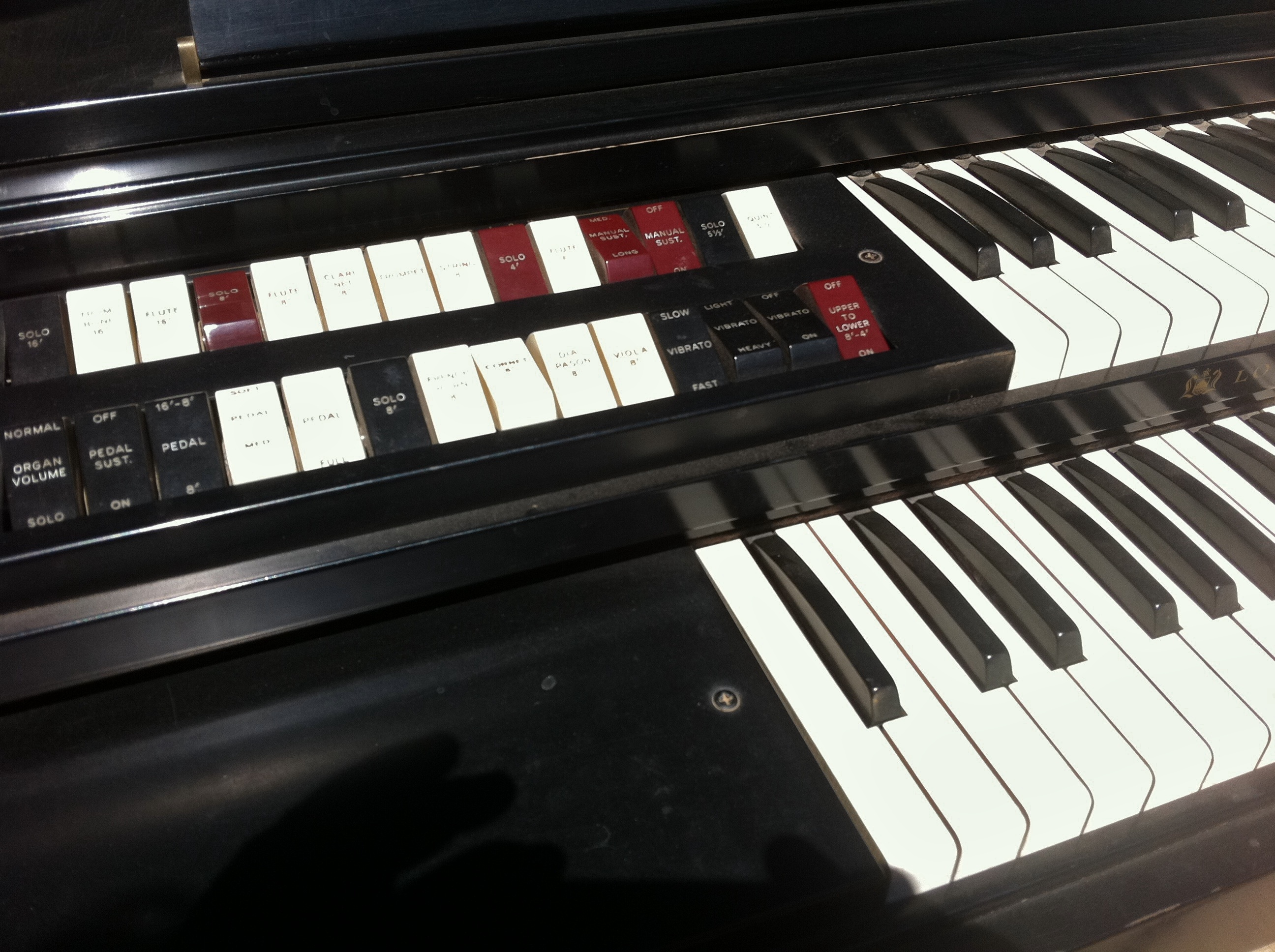
The Lowrey Holiday Deluxe Model LSL (1961) has a built-in Leslie speaker.

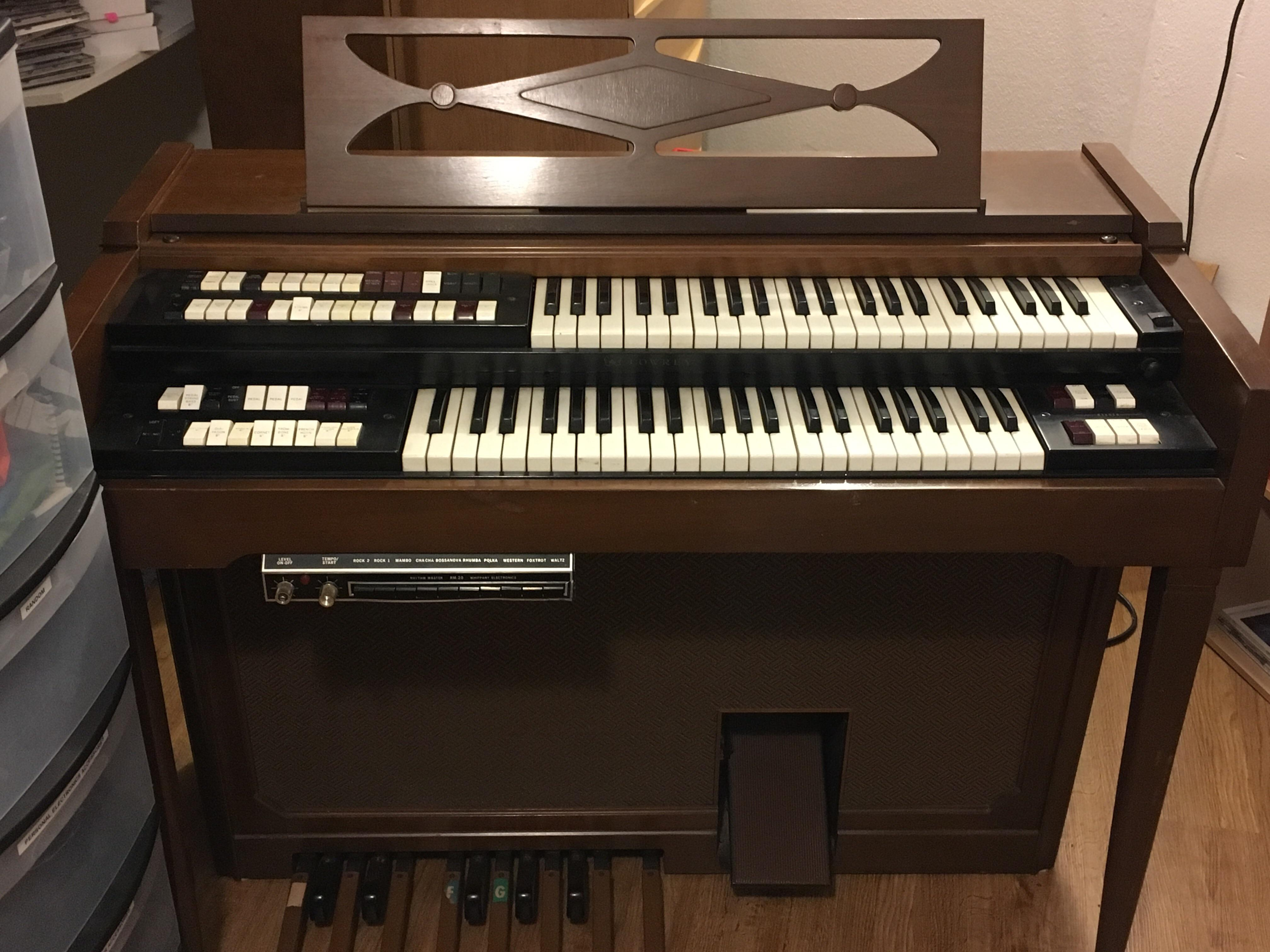
Lowrey DSO-1 Heritage Deluxe (c. 1962)

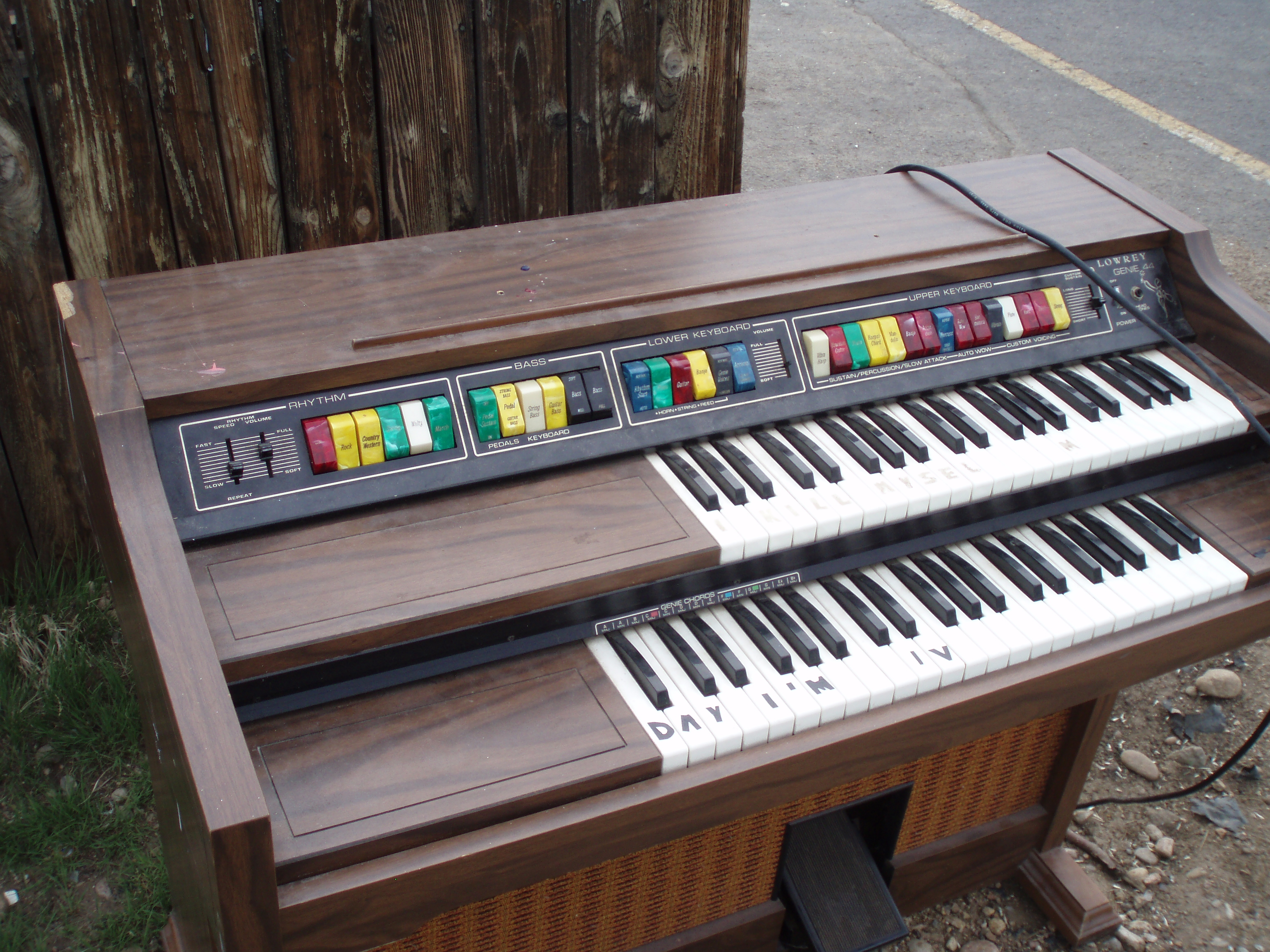
Lowrey Genie 44 electronic organ (1970s)

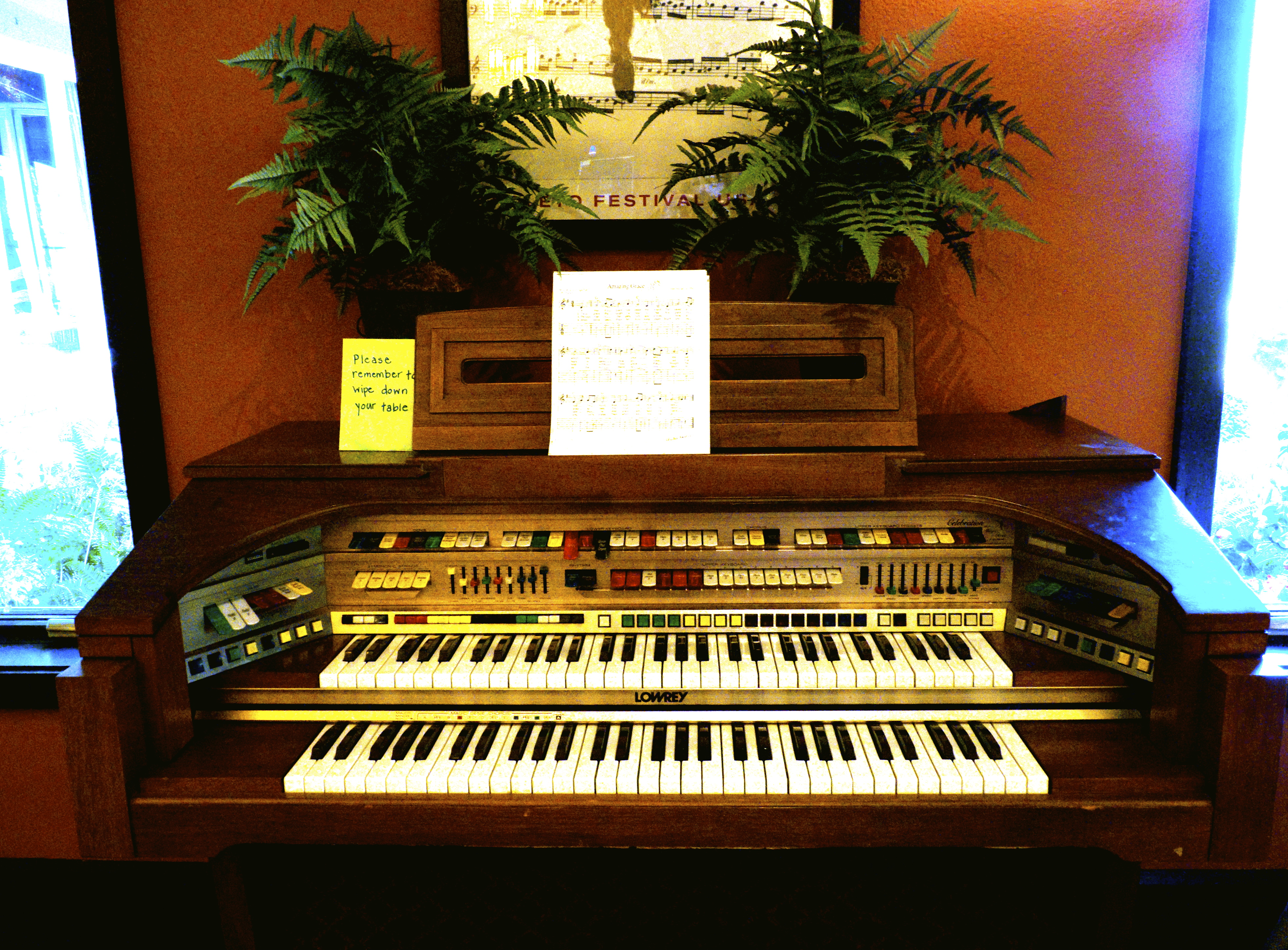
Lowrey C500 Celebration electronic organ (1977)

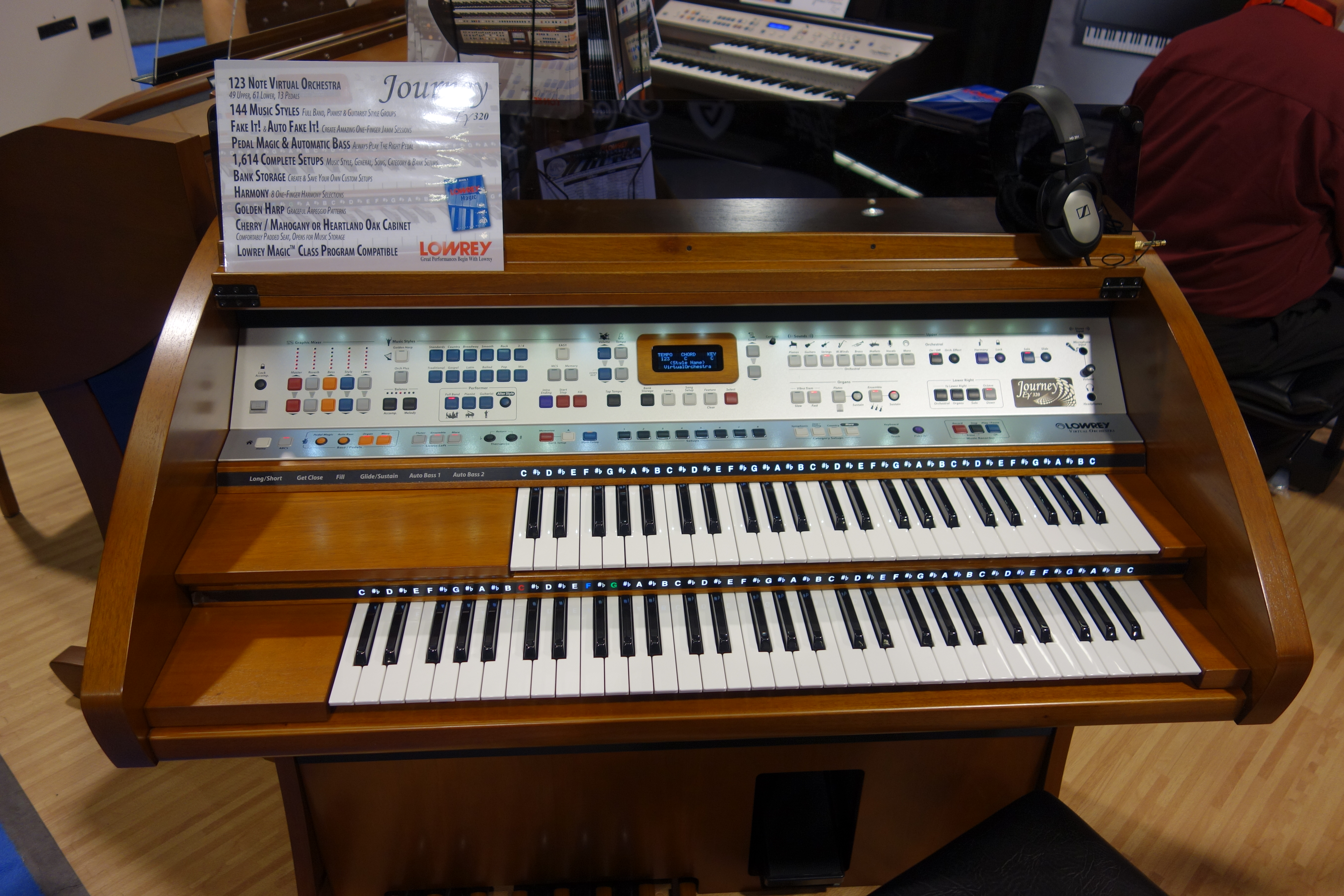
Lowrey Journey EY320 Virtual Orchestra (2010s)

The Lowrey organ is an electronic organ, named after its developer, Frederick C. Lowrey (1871–1955), a Chicago-based industrialist and entrepreneur. Lowrey's first commercially successful full-sized electronic organ, the Model S Spinet or Berkshire, came to market in 1955, the year of his death. Lowrey had earlier developed an attachment for a piano, adding electronic organ stops on 60 notes while keeping the piano functionality, called the Organo, first marketed in 1949 as a very successful competitor to the Hammond Solovox.

During the 1960s and 1970s, Lowrey was the largest manufacturer of electronic organs in the world. In 1989, the Lowrey Organ Company produced its 1,000,000th organ. Until 2011, modern Lowrey organs were built in La Grange Park, Illinois. In 2011, it was announced that production of a few models was to be moved to Indonesia.

== History and notable users ==
=== History ===
Frederick Lowrey experimented with electronic organ design, trying different methods of tone generation, from 1918 until the early 1940s, when he fixed on the Eccles-Jordan circuit, a very stable multivibrator oscillator, which became a Lowrey hallmark. The Lowrey organ differed from its main competitor, the Hammond organ (which also bears the name of its Chicago-based inventor), in relying from its inception on all-electronic tone generation, whereas Hammond used electromechanical tonewheels until 1975. Lowrey led Hammond in the development of automatic accompaniment features; in 1968, automatic rhythm was added, and in 1970 the Genie model added automatic left hand and pedal. While originally intended for the home entertainment market, Lowrey also produced theatre organs and a full 2-manual with pedal church organ.

=== Notable users ===
Lowreys were also used by some rock groups in the 1960s and 1970s. Garth Hudson, the keyboardist of The Band, played a Lowrey Festival organ on many of the group's most notable songs. Its sound can be heard prominently on the 1968 recording of "Chest Fever", which begins with a Bach-inspired prelude/intro. The Lowrey Organ is one of several organs on The Beatles' 1967 song "Being for the Benefit of Mr. Kite!" (from the Sgt. Pepper's Lonely Hearts Club Band album), helping create a fairground atmosphere. Furthermore, a Lowrey DSO Heritage organ was used to produce the classic opening for "Lucy in the Sky with Diamonds". The Lowrey Organ and its built-in drum patterns are also heard on the million-seller single, "Why Can't We Live Together" by Timmy Thomas. A Lowrey Organ, on a percussive "marimba repeat" setting, provided the synthesizer-like background ostinato on The Who song "Baba O'Riley".

Mike Oldfield made use of the instrument quite extensively on his Tubular Bells album, and on several later albums as well. The Gotye song "State of the Art" was written to showcase the sounds of the Lowrey Cotillion model D-575.

Mike Ratledge played the Lowrey Holiday Deluxe with the Soft Machine from their inception in 1966 until his departure in 1976. He seems to have the first to use a fuzz box with an organ, creating a signature sound of Canterbury keyboardists.

Serge Gainsbourg used a model MX-1 Lowrey organ in his apartment in Paris for composition.

Larry Ferrari was a National Concert Artist for the Lowrey Organ Company and hosted the Larry Ferrari Show playing the organ on WPVI-TV in Philadelphia on Sunday mornings from 1954 to 1997.

== Later models ==
From 1966 to 1971, Lowrey also produced combo organs for Gibson while the guitar manufacturer was owned by parent company Chicago Musical Instruments. The most popular of these was introduced in 1966 as the Kalamazoo K-101, but was renamed the Gibson G-101 shortly thereafter. The Gibson-branded organs' design and circuitry were similarly based on Lowrey's own "T-1" and "T-2" models, as well as their "TLO-R" and "Holiday" spinet models. However, they had several additional features that made their sound distinctive from other Lowrey models, including "Repeat", "Glide", and "Trumpet Wow-wow" effects.

In the late 1970s, selling features of Lowrey home organs included Magic Genie Chords, Track III Rhythm and the Automatic Organ Computer.

In the 1980s, Lowrey launched the MicroGenie series of portable organs with built-in speakers, some of which could run on batteries. They included the MicroGenie V60, V100/101, V105, V120, V125 and MicroGenie Pro V600 (which was programmable and had MIDI capability).

== Purchase by Kawai ==
In 1988, Lowrey was purchased by Kawai Musical Instruments.

Beginning in 1990, Lowrey (Kawai) released three units of the NT series, the Holiday, Heritage, and the MX-2. The Heritage and MX-2 were basically the same except the MX-2 had a second "easier to see" grouping of the 10 presets and a cabinet design that was similar to the older MX-1. These units were designed and programmed by engineers from both Kawai (Hamamatsu, Japan) and Lowrey (LaGrange Park, IL). Don Ulrich was the General Manager with the Lowrey engineers Wes Sharratt (cabinet/panel design), Nick Kinnas (Lead programmer & hardware expert), Bob Voves (voicing engineer), Bil Curry (Musical Style arranger), and others (like Mr. Cato's team in Japan) brought these totally new models to market.

The Lowrey/Kawai cooperation continued for the next 28 years advancing the line with the LX series (Majesty, Celebration, Serenade, etc.), SU series (Royale, Stardust, Sensation, etc.) A series (Sterling, Prestige, Patriot, Liberty, etc.) and the EX series (Marquee, Grand Marquee, Aria). Seijiro Imamura and Eiichi Tamura started as engineers and designers from Kawai but at Lowrey in La Grange Park, IL. Mr. Tamura continued developing the Lowrey software when he was transferred back to Japan. He later became the lead programmer for new Lowrey Virtual Orchestras. Mr. Imamura would go on to become the President of Lowrey and later the General Manager of Kawai, U.S.

Beginning with the SU series, Mr. Ouchi, Nick Kinnas, & Bil Curry collaborated to create a new style engine to facilitate full orchestral arrangements as well as smaller ensembles, combos, and single instruments. This software was later expanded by Eiichi Tamura for the A series and later for the EX series. Nick Kinnas was key to making the software from Kawai work with what Bil Curry needed to advance the style arrangements. This included new sounds from Bob Voves and the Kawai engineering group.

On October 5, 2018, Seijiro Imamura, Vice-President of the Lowrey Division of Kawai America Corp., announced that Lowrey Organ production would cease in January 2019.

After organ production ceased, Dave Brown (Critchett's Music, Bettendorf, IA) formed the Lowrey Legacy group with Bil Curry & Nick Kinnas (consultant). This partnership created new software updates for the A and EX & some SU series Lowrey organs as follows:

1. Aria-22, Aria-22-Star, Aria-22-Platinum, Aria-22-Star-Platinum, Aria-Star, Aria-Platinum, Aria-Star-Platinum
2. Extreme (this is a Grand Marquee with all the original Aria styles), Extreme-Star, Extreme-Star-Platinum
3. Grand Marquee-Star, Grand Marquee-Platinum, Grand Marquee-Star-Platinum
4. Marquee-Star, Marquee-Platinum, Marquee-Star-Platinum
5. Rialto-Star, Rialto-Platinum, Rialto-Star-Platinum (the Inspire is automatically updated to a Rialto with these packages)

== See also ==
- List of Lowrey organs
