= Farfisa =

Italian electronics manufacturer

ACI Farfisa keyboards
- Industry: Electronics
- Founded: 1946; 80 years ago
- Founder: Merged from Settimo Soprani, Scandalli and Frontalini
- Fate: Music division purchased by Bontempi
- Headquarters: Osimo, Italy
- Products: Intercom system; Historical products: Electronics: radio receivers, television sets; Musical instruments: electronic organs, combo organs, synthesizers, accordions

Farfisa (Italian: Fabbriche Riunite di Fisarmoniche) is a manufacturer of electronics based in Osimo, Italy, founded in 1946. They manufactured a series of compact electronic organs in the 1960s and 1970s, including the Compact, FAST, Professional and VIP ranges, and later, a series of other keyboard instruments. They were used by a number of popular musicians, including Sam the Sham, Country Joe and the Fish, Pink Floyd, Sly Stone, Elton John, Blondie, Suicide, the B-52s, and Philip Glass.

The company was formed after three Italian accordion manufacturers combined to form a single company. They began to produce electronic instruments in the late 1950s, and combo organs were introduced in response to similar instruments such as the Vox Continental. The relatively inexpensive Italian labour allowed Farfisa to sell their products cheaper than the competition, which led to their commercial success. Popular models included the Compact series, the Professional, the FAST and the VIP. The success of Farfisa organs declined with the increased popularity of the Hammond organ in rock groups during the 1970s, and in response the company produced models that could emulate a Hammond, and introduced electronic pianos and synthesisers. The Farfisa brand name saw a brief revival in the late 1970s as part of the new wave movement, and the final models were produced in the early 1980s. The company has survived, and Farfisa is now a consumer electronics manufacturer.

== History ==
Farfisa Compact Organ
A Farfisa Compact (here sampled on a Nord Stage)

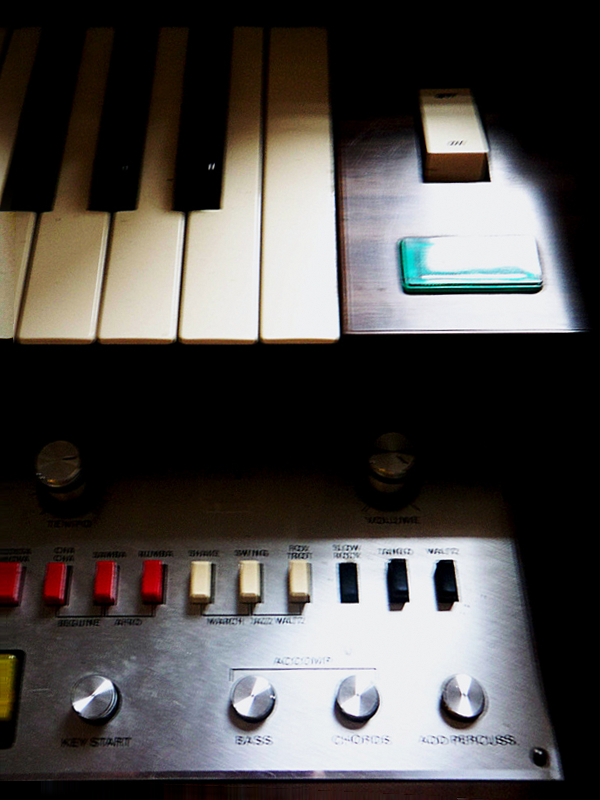
Farfisa made in Ancona, Italy

The background to Farfisa was the popularity of the accordion in early 20th-century Italy. Silvio Scandalli started making these instruments by hand, commuting to Castelfidardo, Ancona daily. He was hoping to work for Paolo Soprani, who established the country's first accordion factory. He founded the Scandalli Brothers, who grew to employ from 400–700 people in their accordion factories. Farfisa was established in 1946, following the mergers of Settimo Soprani, Scandalli and Frontalini, whose businesses had suffered during World War II. The company was officially named Fabbriche Riunite Fisarmoniche Italiane S.p.A (United Italian Accordion Factories), and production continued in Castelfidardo. It quickly became the world's largest supplier of accordions, making up to 180 instruments a day with over 1,600 employees. The International Accordion Museum now occupies the site of the original factory.

During the 1950s, after sales of accordions began to decline, Farfisa began to diversify its range of instruments including radios, televisions and musical instruments. The Microrgan, a portable reed organ, was released in 1958; it used an electric fan to blow air across the reeds. Two years later, the company developed the Cordovox accordion with Lowrey, which combined accordion reeds with electronically generated sounds.

Following the introduction of the Vox Continental combo organ in 1962, Farfisa decided to quickly build a competing instrument using the technical expertise they had gained from working with Lowrey. The first model, the Combo Compact, was introduced in 1964. Production was moved to a factory in Aspio Terme. The relatively cheap labour in Italy, compared to the UK and US meant that Farfisa were able to produce a greater quantity of combo organs at a cheaper cost, and consequently, they were picked up by many amateur and semi-professional groups. For example, the list price of a Farfisa Mini Compact in 1966 was $495, compared to $995 of the Vox Continental a year before. Distribution in the U.S. was handled by the Chicago Musical Instruments Company, which also owned Gibson, and the instruments were originally known as CMI organs when introduced there. This design was copied for later combo organs such as the Gibson G-101. The organs also had a flip-down modesty panel displaying the brand name.

The line of FAST (Farfisa All-Silicon Transistorized) organs was launched at the 1968 NAMM Convention. These superseded the earlier Compact models based on germanium transistors and were styled like the Vox Continental, including chrome stands. The Professional series appeared around the same time and included more features than earlier models. The VIP models were introduced in 1970 and included a foot-operated pitch bend. At the height of its production, Farfisa operated three factories to produce instruments in Camerano, Marche in Italy.

By the late 1960s, major groups had moved on from combo organs and started to prefer the sound of a Hammond organ with an overdriven Leslie speaker, which were used by contemporary groups such as Yes, Emerson, Lake & Palmer, Deep Purple and Uriah Heep. In response, Farfisa advertised that its latest organs at that point could emulate a Hammond and had a full set of drawbars. The American conglomerate Lear Siegler became a major controlling interest in 1968. Production of combo organs began to be phased out in the late 1970s, after synthesizers had become more commonplace, with the last unit being produced in 1982. The company faced increased competition from Japanese companies and struggled to handle the departure of the Scandalli family from the company. However, Farfisa has survived into the 21st century, and the brand mainly produces intercom systems with the company ACI Farfisa, which makes and distributes systems for video intercoms, access control, video surveillance, and home automation. The Bontempi group owns the rights for Farfisa keyboards.

== Models ==
=== Compact Series (1964–1968) ===
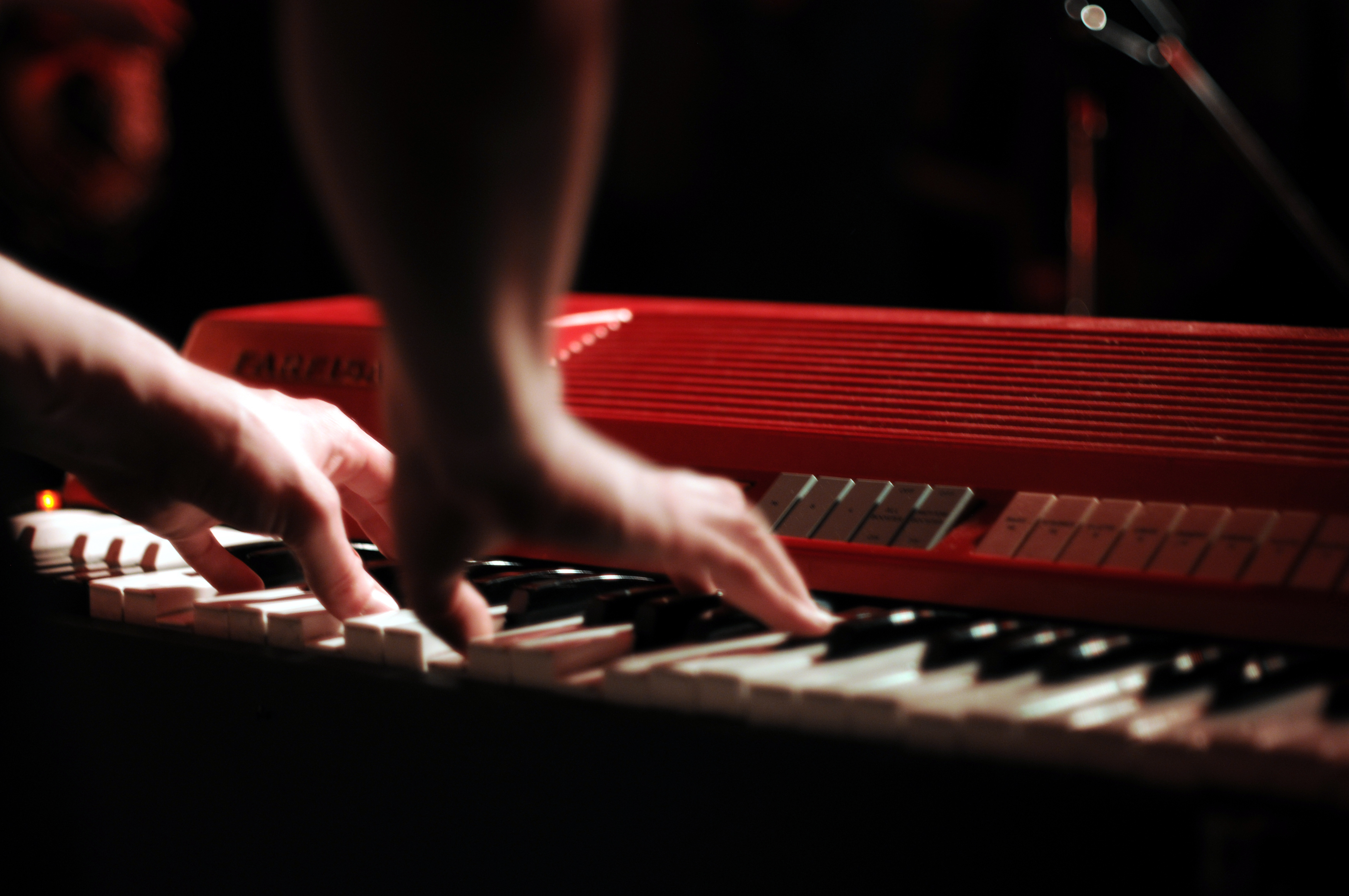
Farfisa Combo Compact

The Compact series contains four models – Combo Compact, Mini Compact, Compact Deluxe and Compact Duo. They have 12 tone generator boards; one for each note of the scale, and use a frequency divider to generate the remaining notes. Unlike later organs, the Compact series is not fully transistorised, and includes high-voltage tube circuitry for the reverb unit. On most single-manual models the tone controls and a bass section volume are located on an indented panel on the rear of the instrument. Underneath the keyboards, there is a knee-high lever that can be actuated for tone boost, turned on by rocker levers on the console. The series features a photoresistor-driven swell pedal, instead of the later and more common potentiometer. There are two jack outputs, the second of which is optional and can be used to send the bass through a different amplifier. There is also a headphone output jack, but it's designed for now-obsolete 2000 ohm-impedance headphones. Though advertised as a "transistorised" model, the spring reverb tank is valve-driven. An optional 13-note bass pedalboard can be added to all models except the Mini-Compact. Unlike other combo organs like the Vox Continental, Farfisa Compact organs have integrated legs, which can be folded up and stored inside its base.

The Combo Compact has a five-octave keyboard, one of which of bass with inverse key colors, 16' bass and strings, 8' flute, oboe, trumpet and strings, 4' flute, piccolo and strings, four vibrato settings, three choices of reverb and three bass volume switches. It has a built-in spring reverb system.

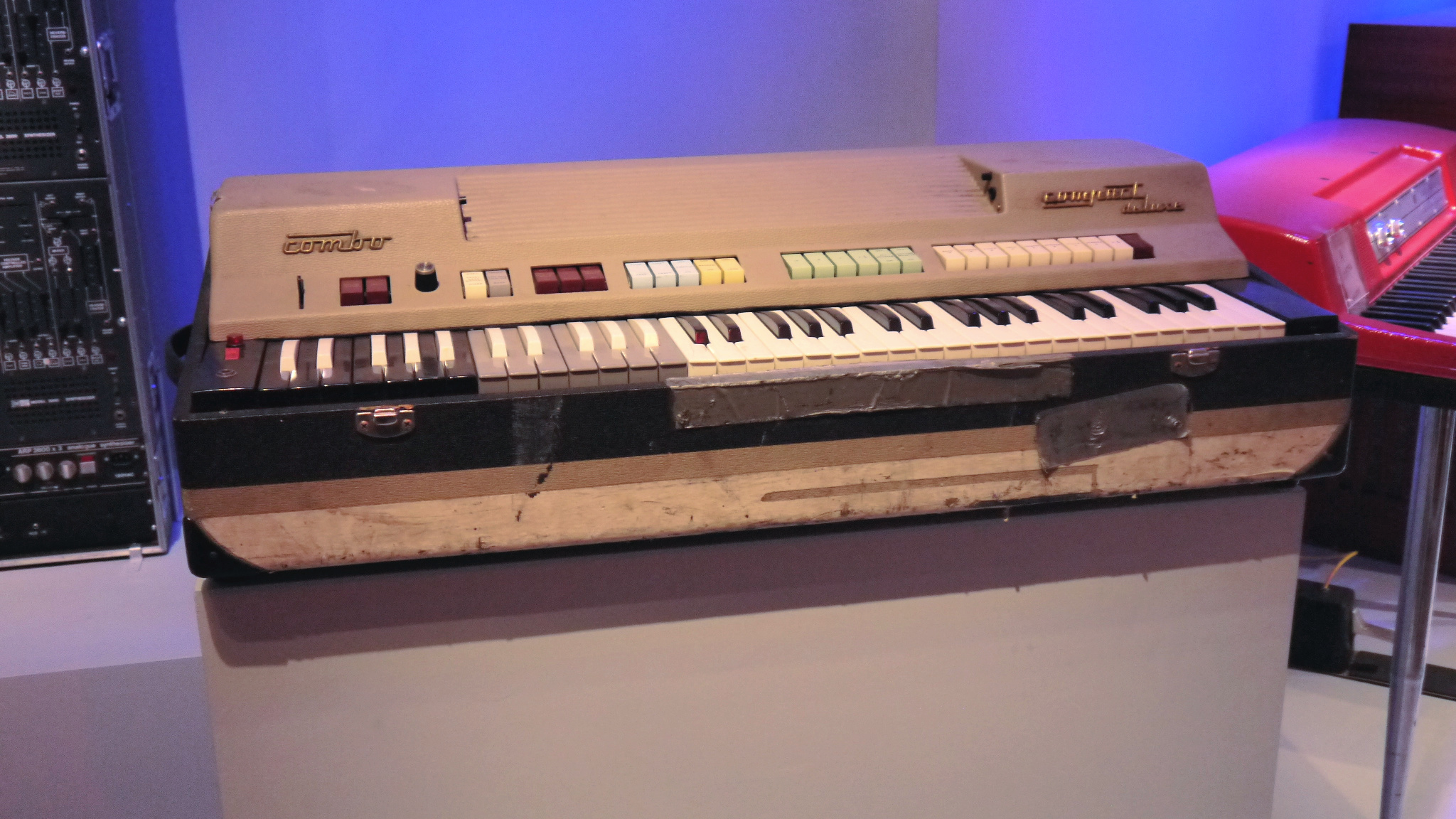
Kate Pierson's Farfisa Combo Compact Deluxe

The Mini Compact is the smallest of the Compact Series, and was introduced in 1966. It has only four octaves, with no bass on the early models. The later version has a selector switch to choose bass or high sound in the lowest octave; these models have grey naturals with white sharps in the bass octave. Some of these extended bass models have only three voices (sounds), while the later models had six voices. Early compact models including the Mini Compact and Mini Deluxe Compact have three tone switches – dolce, principale and strings, in 16', 8' and 4' footages. Later models include 16' bass, 8' flute, oboe, strings and 4' flute and strings. The first models have removable legs which could be stored inside the bottom cover, as opposed to later models that have folding or pivoting non-removable ones.

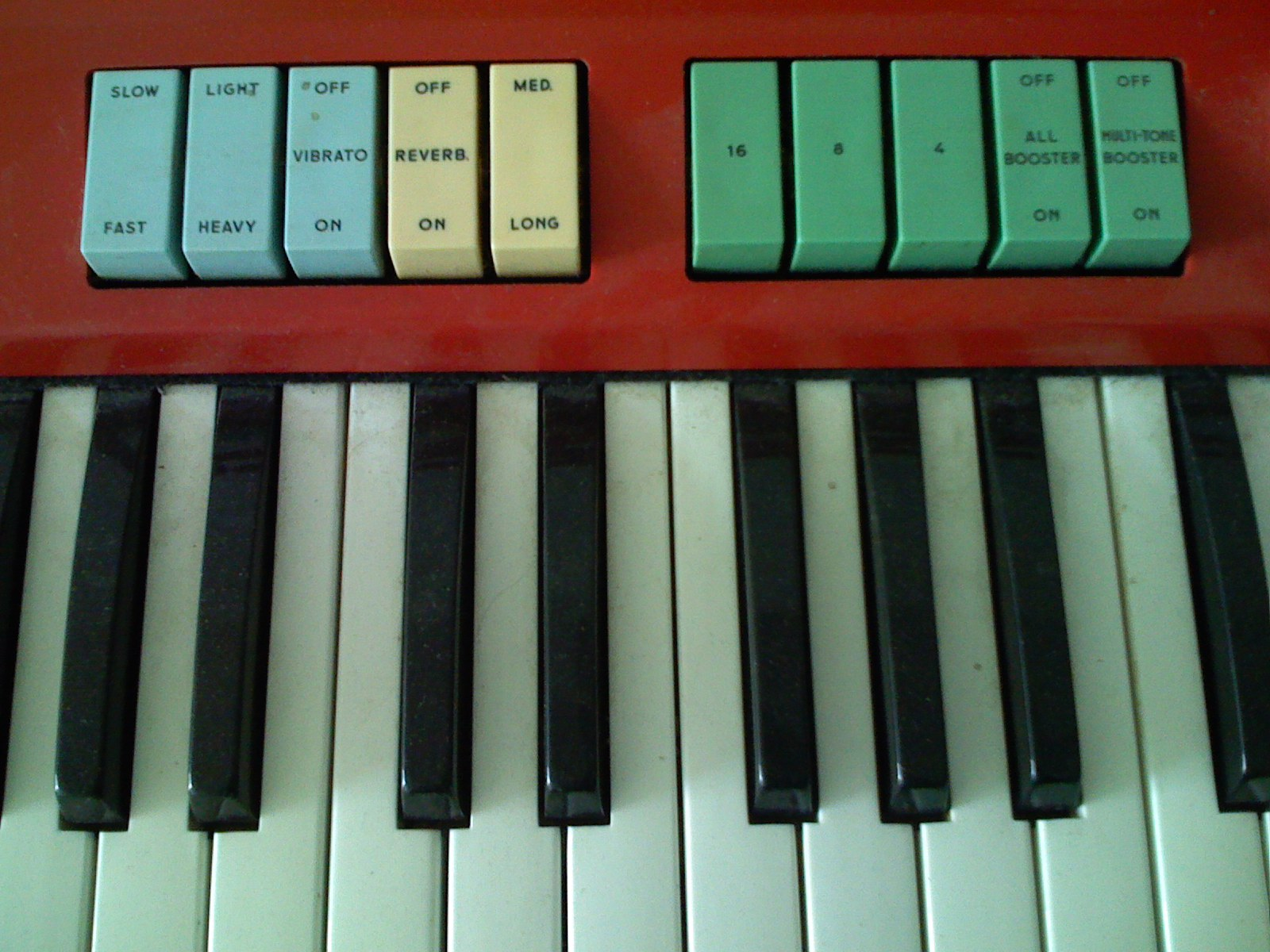
Tabs for the Combo Compact

The Compact Duo was introduced in 1966. It weighs 90 pounds (41 kg) and supports 49-key manuals. It features a four-octave upper keyboard with 9 selectors: 16' Bass, Strings; 8' Flute, Oboe, Trumpet, Strings; 4' Flute, Strings; 2-2/3' (Flute) and Brilliance, and a four-octave lower keyboard with three selectors: Dolce, Principale and Ottava. There are two inferior octaves on the left-hand side of the lower keyboard; one octave is switch-controllable for choice of a bass or acute sound. The instrument has four vibrato and three reverb settings. Later models also incorporate tremolo, percussion and repeat functions for both the upper and lower treble manuals independently. Unlike other Compact series organs, the Compact Duo models require a separate power supply/solid-state preamp/real spring reverb unit (called the Farfisa F/AR), to which the organ connects via a multi-lead cable. Alternatively, it can be powered by a separate Farfisa TR/60 amplifier.

Farfisa updated the Compact range through the 1960s, adding new features, but without changing the general model name. Later Compact models, such as the Combo Compact I introduced in 1968, include two inferior octaves (one black/white, one grey/white) on the left hand side of the keyboard. One set of octaves is switch-controllable for choice of a bass or acute sound with bass note sustain and controllable bass percussion. The volume balance between bass and treble is adjustable. The Compact Deluxe features similar controls to the Compact I, with additional voices such as the 2-2/3' footage with an independent "brilliant" tab. Later models, such as the Combo Deluxe Compact I, also include a rhythm section (drum machine) of brush cymbal and drum. The final Compact models were manufactured in 1969.

The Compact series has caused reliability problems for later collectors. It features germanium transistors which tend to drift in value, and the plastic keys have tended to degrade over time, leaving cracks. Other problems include corroded contacts, leading to non-working switchings, and failing electrolytic capacitors. The design of the instrument makes it difficult to access components and service them.

=== FAST Series (1968–1971) ===
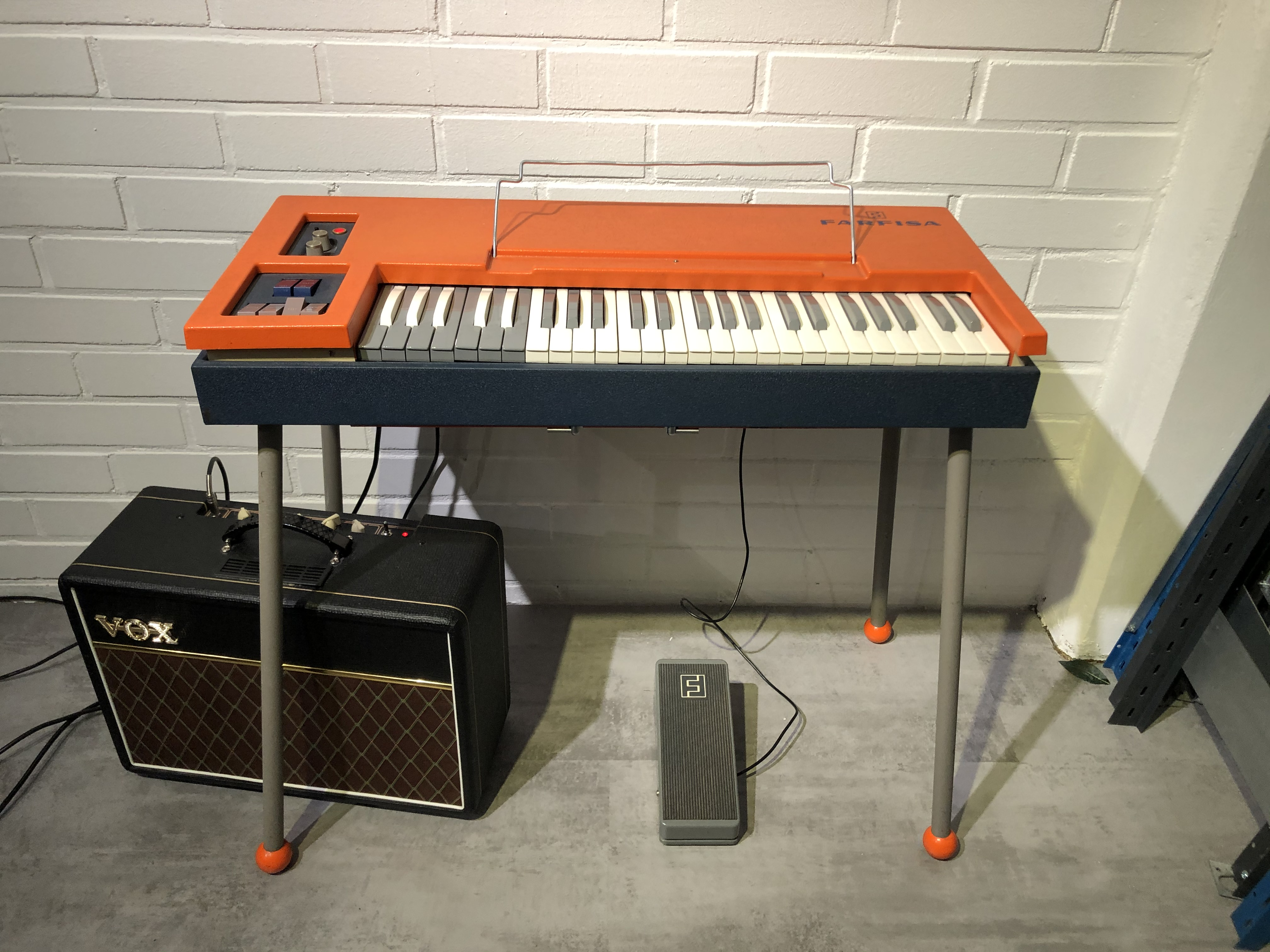
Farfisa Fast 2 plugged to an Vox AC-10 Tube amp

The FAST (Farfisa All Silicon Transistor) Series models were first introduced in 1967, to complement the existing Combo series. As the name implies, these use silicon transistors that produced more stable tones than the germanium ones used in the Compact series. The organs are contained in a metal cabinet covered with a skin plate and plastic edges, chrome folding legs, retractable carrying handles, and a removable music rack.

The Fast 2 has a four-octave keyboard (C to C) with a one-octave manual bass on the left. There are four voice stops (flute, clarinet, reed and strings), all at 8', a two-speed vibrato and an optional swell pedal. The Fast 3 features more sounds, including 16' bass and clarinet, 8' oboe and trumpet, and with 8' and 4' flute. The Fast 4 has a larger five-octave keyboard, with an additional light / heavy vibrato option, two mixture stops and five percussion controls. The Fast 5 adds three sustain stops.

=== Professional Series (1968–1975) ===
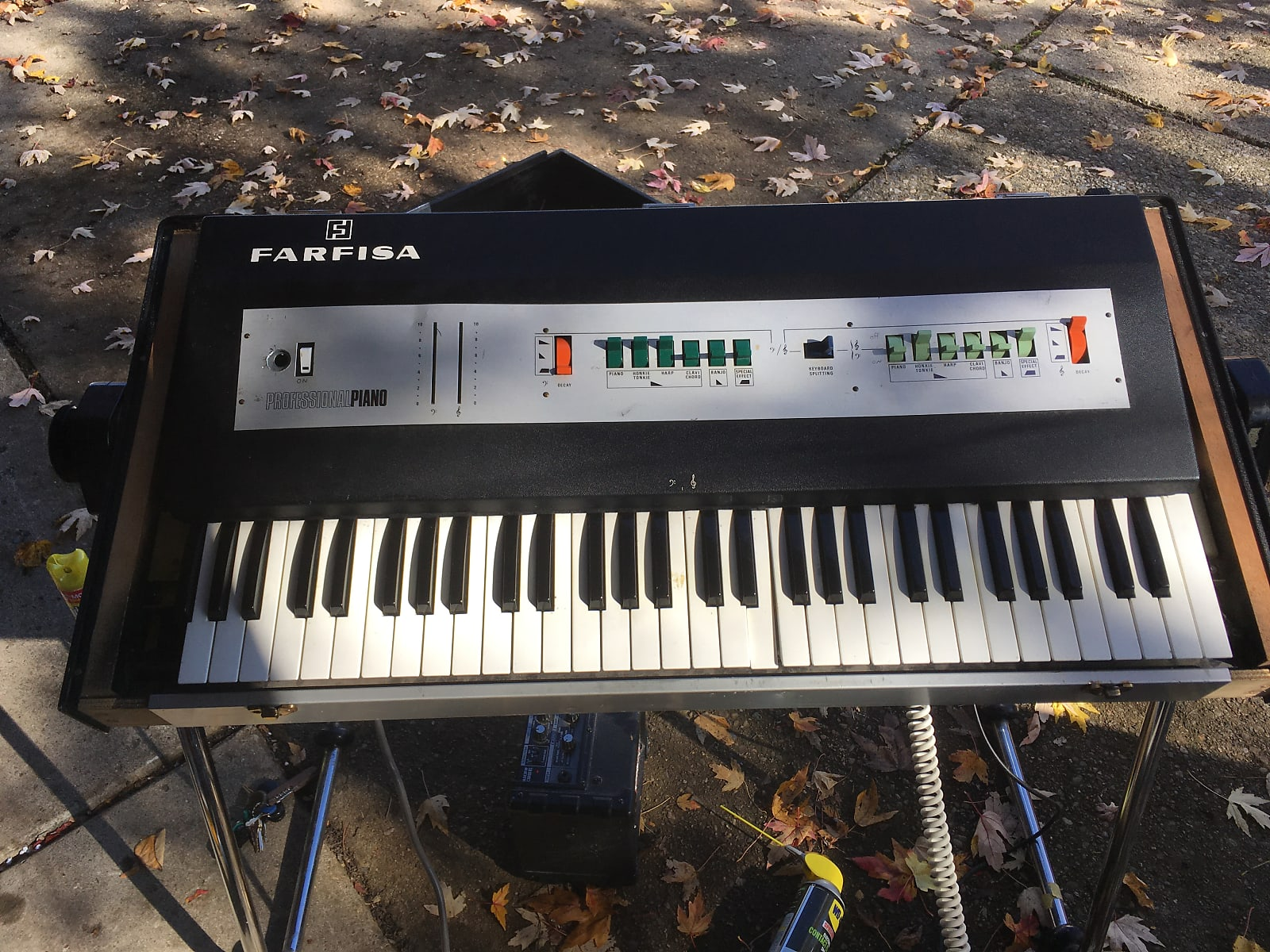
Farfisa Professional Piano

The Professional series were the most sophisticated models made by Farfisa, first announced in August 1968 and designed to compete with the Hammond. Contemporary advertising emphasised that these series of instruments did not sound like other combo organs and could be used for soul and rhythm and blues effectively. The instruments included sustain, eight different footages, a variety of percussion and vibrato options.

The Professional (Model PP/222 and PP/221) contains a single keyboard with grey keys. The vibrato uses a phase shifter circuit placed after the main oscillators, as this was the only way to make individual controls for each voice work.

The VIP-series organs were announced in 1970, which included a "Synthe-Slalom" foot pedal used for pitch bend.

=== Later models ===
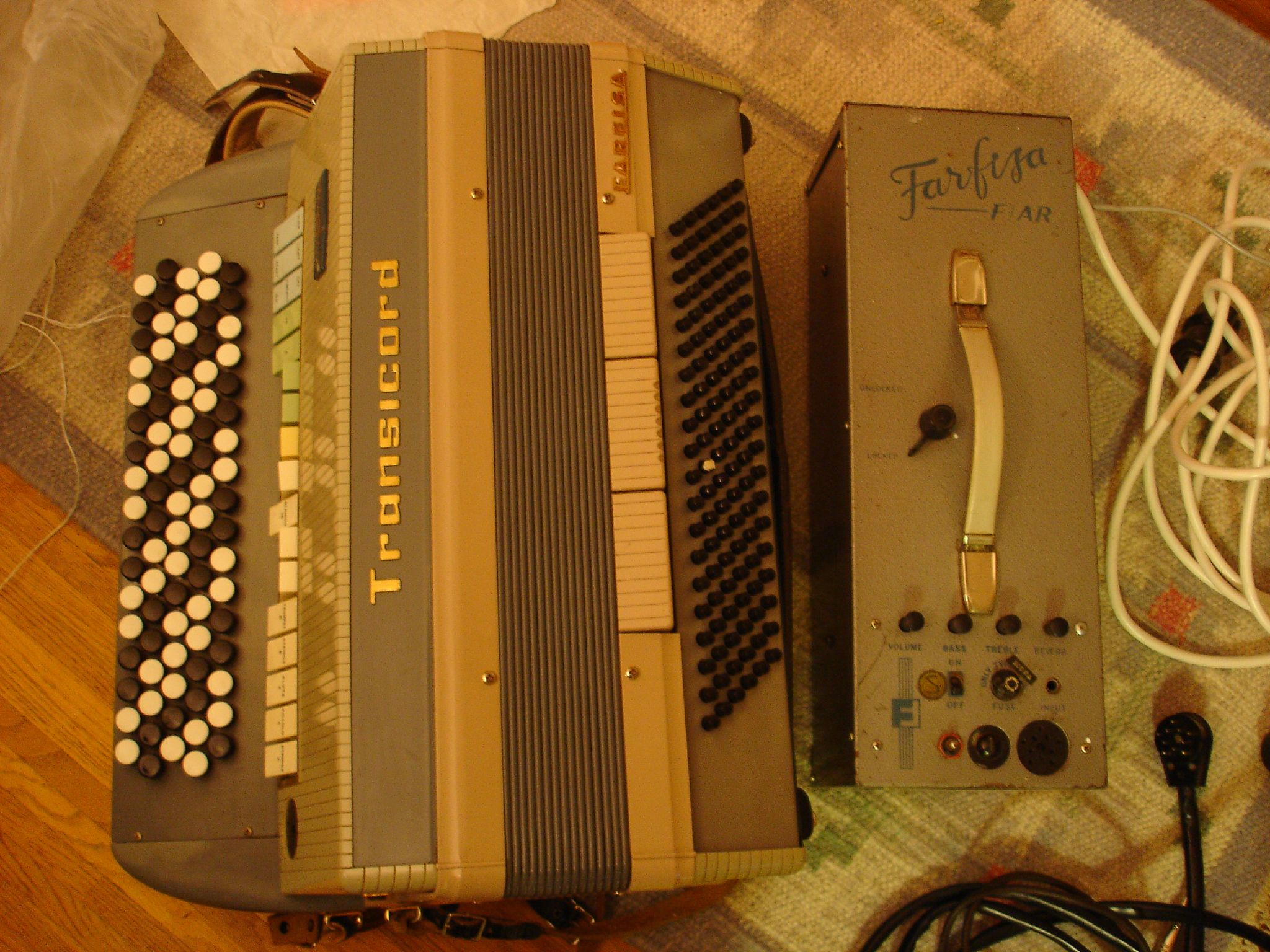
Farfisa Transicord

The Transicord was a transistor electric accordion, and is essentially the circuitry for a Compact-series organ in an accordion-shaped box. There are no reeds; the instrument is purely electronic. It was designed to be used in conjunction with Farfisa's amplifiers, and has a multi-pin cable that connects the controls of the accordion with the controls of the amplifier, or the F/AR Reverb preamp power supply unit.

The Farfisa Matador was introduced in 1972. Unlike earlier instruments, it uses drawbars to select a variable amount of sound, like a Hammond. The lowest 17 keys cover the manual bass section. The Matador-M was a compact version that used tabs.

In 1975, Farfisa introduced the Stereo Syntorchestra synthesiser, that combined a polyphonic string ensemble with a monophonic analogue synth. It features a three-octave keyboard, and separate outputs for the monophonic and polyphonic sections. The Soundmaker was Farfisa's next non-organ instrument, with a further development of the synthesizer approach, incorporating an improved string sound and more modifiable monophonic synthesiser sounds. It was mainly sold in continental Europe. This was followed by the Polychrome, built at the end of the 1970s. It was Farfisa's largest and most comprehensive non-organ instrument, as an analog synthesizer featuring vocal, brass, string, and percussion sections, including a built in chorus, phase, modulation and aftertouch.

Among the last combo organs made by Farfisa were the Bravo and Commander, released in 1980. The Commander reprised part of the design of the VIP 205 in updated form, while the lightweight and simple Bravo's sound was a move to compete with emerging portable keyboards and synthesisers.

== Notable users ==
=== 1960s ===
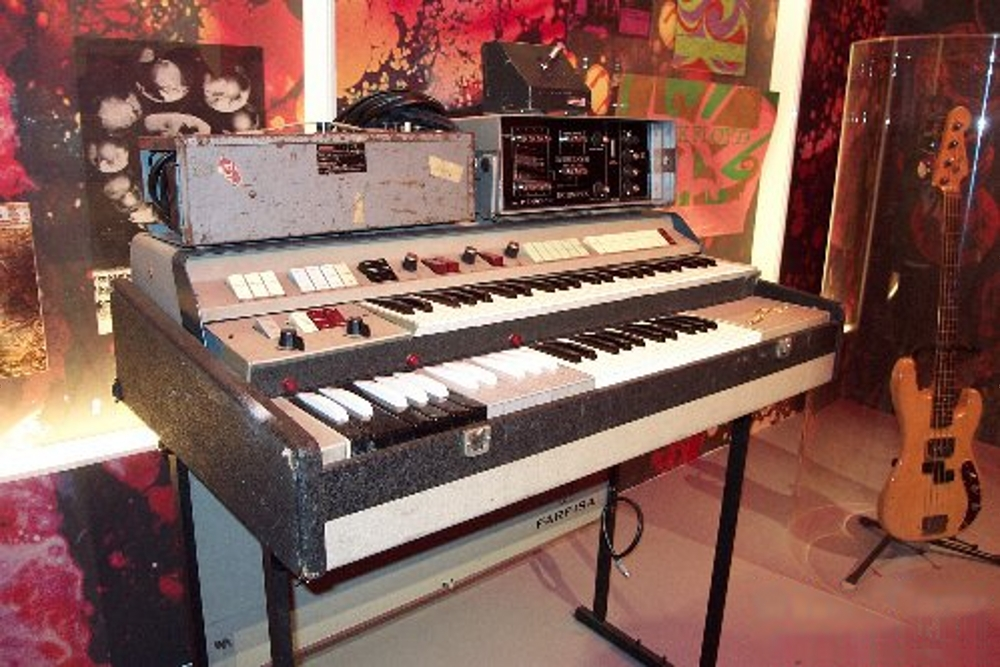
Richard Wright's Farfisa Compact Duo, used with Pink Floyd

One of the first rock organists to play and spotlight the Farfisa was Domingo Samudio, known as "Sam the Sham", who played a Combo Compact with his group The Pharaohs on their first hit "Wooly Bully" in 1965. In 1967, it was the main instrument in the Strawberry Alarm Clock's hit "Incense and Peppermints". Other groups using Farfisas around this time included The Blues Magoos, The Blues Project and Country Joe and the Fish. Some sources suggest The Doors' Ray Manzarek upgraded from a Vox Continental to a Farfisa, but he actually used a Gibson G-101. Spooner Oldham, the house organist of Alabama recording studio Muscle Shoals Sound Studio, can be heard playing the Farfisa on numerous southern soul recordings from the 1960s, including "When a Man Loves a Woman" by Percy Sledge.

Richard Wright's use of the Farfisa was integral to Pink Floyd's early sound, and his main instrument on the albums from The Piper at the Gates of Dawn (1967) to Ummagumma (1969), as well as live performances, such as on "Careful with That Axe, Eugene". Wright started with a Combo Compact, before progressing to a Compact Duo. By 1970, he had started to use a Hammond onstage and alternated between that and the Farfisa, depending on the song. The Farfisa was last used on The Dark Side of the Moon (1973), but Wright reintroduced it to his keyboard setup on David Gilmour's 2006 tour, featured on the Pink Floyd song "Echoes". Hugh Banton from Van der Graaf Generator originally used the Farfisa Compact Duo, before switching to a Professional after the band's gear was stolen. He applied his knowledge of electronics and contacts as a former BBC engineer to customise it with a variety of additional effects pedals, including distortion and phasing. He later started using a Hammond organ as an additional instrument. The Professional was retired after the group's 1972 split.

The Grateful Dead's Ron "Pigpen" McKernan's first keyboard with the group was a Farfisa Compact, before switching to a Vox and then a Hammond. Sly Stone from Sly and the Family Stone played a Farfisa Professional, as seen at their 1969 Woodstock Festival performance. Composer Philip Glass began using Farfisa organs with his ensemble in the late 1960s. A Mini-Compact was played by him and Michael Riesman on some of Glass' early recordings, including Einstein on the Beach; Glass is still in possession of his original Farfisa as of 2018. Steve Reich featured four Farfisa organs in his piece Four Organs.

=== 1970s ===
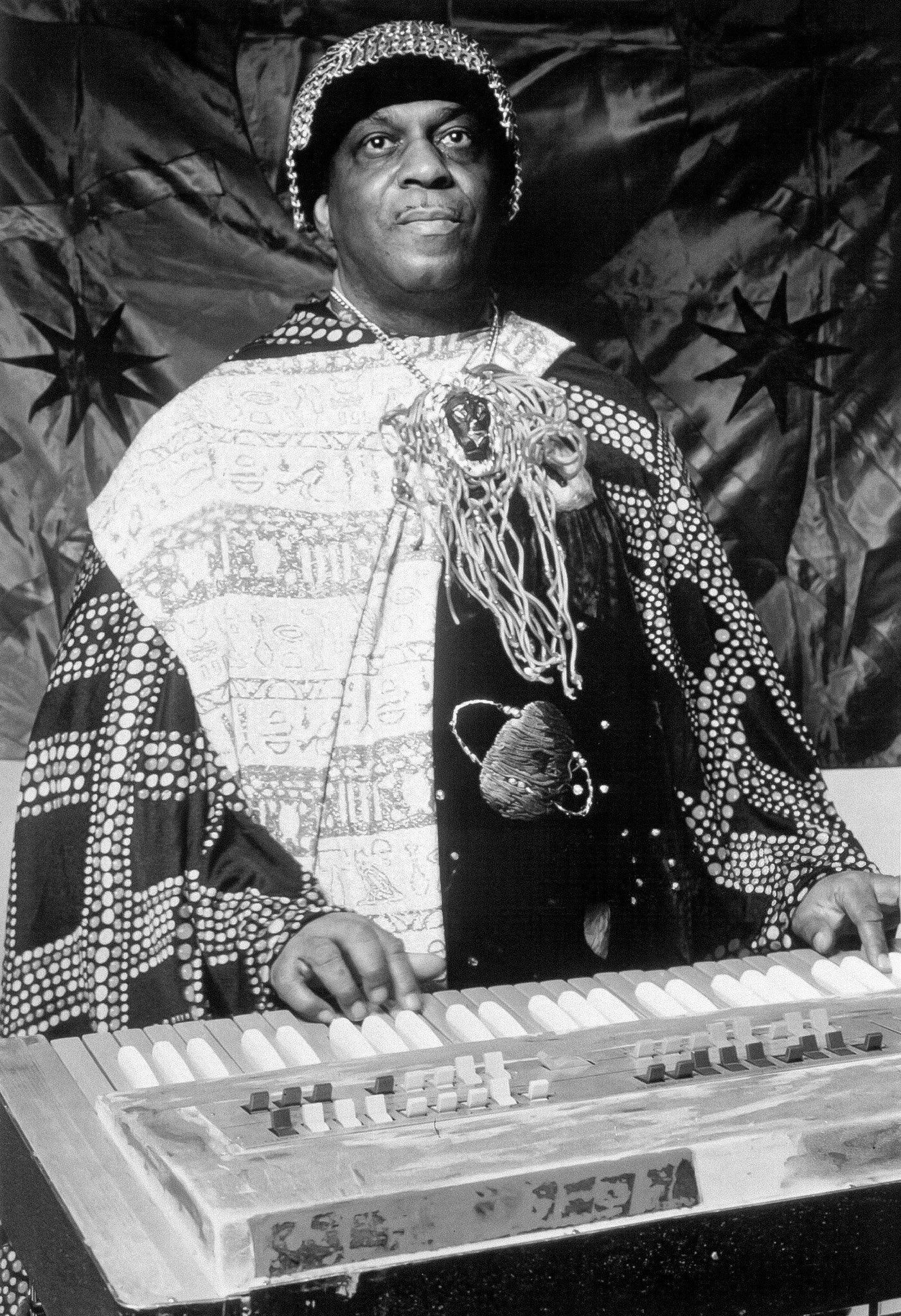
Sun Ra playing a Farfisa Professional

Elton John used the Farfisa on several early recordings, including the 1972 hit "Crocodile Rock". He called the Farfisa "the worst organ sound possible" and used it in order to sound like Johnny and the Hurricanes. John Paul Jones of Led Zeppelin used a Farfisa on "Dancing Days" from Houses of the Holy.

Mike Oldfield's album Tubular Bells (1973) features a Farfisa organ as one of the instruments. Can's Irmin Schmidt regularly used the Professional and Professional Piano. The Syntorchestra was used by Klaus Schulze on several albums, including Moondawn. Manuel Göttsching played the instrument on New Age of Earth.

After the introduction of synthesizers, Farfisa combo organs became less popular, but were revived in the late 1970s by several punk rock and new wave bands (especially those influenced by 1960s garage rock and psychedelia). Blondie's Jimmy Destri used the Farfisa as his main instrument, and included stage tricks such as playing it with a hammer. Other groups from this period using Farfisas included The B-52's and Talking Heads. Numerous songs by the Industrial group Cabaret Voltaire use Farfisa drum machines and organs.

=== Later recordings ===
Inspiral Carpets' Clint Boon's main instrument was a Farfisa Compact Duo. The Post-rock group Stereolab used various Farfisa organs extensively throughout their career, beginning with a Bravo model they found cheaply in a second-hand store. OMD used Farfisa organs during the recording of Universal (1996).

Green Day used a Farfisa organ on the song "Misery" from the album Warning, played by bassist Mike Dirnt.

== Emulations ==
The sound of a Farfisa has been hard to accurately synthesise. In 2016, Arturia released a Farfisa V audio plugin that can be played using a MIDI keyboard or controller. It emulates the Combo Compact and the Compact Duo, along with a number of effects boxes and amplifier simulations. The Nord Stage includes a Farfisa emulation.

== See also ==
- "Farfisa Beat", a song by Squeeze released in 1980.
