= Cotillion (novel) =

1952 romance novel by Georgette Heyer

- First edition cover
- Author: Georgette Heyer
- Language: English
- Genre: Regency, Romance
- Publisher: Heinemann
- Publication date: 1953
- Publication place: United Kingdom
- Media type: Print
- Pages: 368 pp
- ISBN: 978-1-4022-1008-2
- OCLC: 137244661
- Dewey Decimal: 823/.912 22
- LC Class: PR6015.E795 C68 2007

Cotillion is Georgette Heyer's twelfth regency romance, published in the UK in January 1953 by Heinemann and in the U.S. in February 1953 by G. P. Putnam's Sons. '

== Plot ==
Matthew Penicuik has brought up Catherine (known as Kitty) Charing, the orphaned daughter of an old school friend, at his isolated home of Arnside House. Now that she is approaching the age of twenty, he has summoned his great nephews and promised that his money and land will pass to whichever of them will marry her. Of these, Lord Biddenden is unable to make her an offer because he is already married. However, his younger brother, Hugh Rattray, a rector in holy orders, is present. So is their cousin, Foster, Lord Dolphinton, a half-witted earl, known as Dolph to the rest of the family. Two other cousins have not arrived: Jack Westruther, who prefers not to come, and the elegant but not very bright dandy, Freddy Standen, who has only found out about the invitation at the last moment.

Kitty is invited to meet those whom she has been brought up to regard as cousins and receives a proposal from the self-interested Rector, who cannot hide that he is out for the main chance. When he is turned down, Dolph follows, but it is plain that he is proposing only because his domineering mother has told him to, and Kitty refuses him too. Humiliated on learning that she will receive nothing directly from her guardian except as she is bid for to keep the money in the family, Kitty flees the house, determined to earn a living in London, where she has always longed to go.

Cold weather forces Kitty to seek warmth at an inn on the way and there she meets Freddy, who is shocked to learn that she has been made an item of barter. Together they hatch a plot whereby he will temporarily act as her protector and pretend that they are engaged. Accordingly she secretly re-enters the house and accepts Freddy's proposal on being summoned downstairs to receive it. They leave together next day, but Freddy’s mother, Lady Legerdown, cannot act as her chaperone because the rest of her children have gone down with measles. Instead Kitty stays with Freddy's elder sister Meg in the absence of her husband on a diplomatic mission.

The story of Kitty's betrothal is now kept secret and Freddy plays the role of her cousin and protector. This involves him in some trouble as he coaches Kitty through the difficulties of fashionable social life and is expected to guide her round the sights of London. These trials cause him to become more thoughtful and resourceful, much to the surprise of his father, Lord Legerwood, who had hitherto dismissed Freddy as no more than a well-dressed society butterfly.

Kitty now becomes acquainted again with her childhood hero, Jack Westruther, who thinks himself sure of gaining her hand on this account but in the meantime is in dishonourable pursuit of another beauty, Olivia Broughty, whose mother is trying to get her well-married despite the disadvantages of vulgar relations and having little in the way of dowry. Jack also reacquaints her with Camille, her French cousin on her mother’s side, who is passing under the title Chevalier d'Evron but is in fact a card-player and gambler. Through Kitty, Olivia meets Camille and the two fall instantly in love.

Kitty's social career is further complicated by the reappearance of Dolph, who has been instructed by his mother to propose again since Kitty’s betrothal has been concealed. Kitty, however, gets Dolph to admit that he is already engaged to Hannah Plymstock, daughter of a radical tradesman. Dolph adores her and Hannah wants to free him from the debilitating influence of his mother and allow him to retire to the family estate in Ireland and breed horses, his cherished dream. Kitty therefore agrees to accompany Dolph on his secret visits to Hannah, since he is spied on by the family servants, and to do this she has to take Freddy into her confidence since her behaviour is causing gossip.

By this time, Kitty and Freddy have learned to value each other and act as a team. Through their means the various mismatched couples are united and they themselves become engaged in earnest.

== The novel ==
The novel was begun in 1952 and during its course was given two earlier alternative titles. The first was Quadrille, a dance for four couples in square formation, of which a cotillion (the final title) was a more lively forerunner. The other working title was Chicken Hazard, the name of a low stakes game of dice. Georgette Heyer only had a rough outline for plot when she began and was puzzled how the novel might develop once Kitty arrived in London. She was to describe its later development in a letter as "a riot of absurdity". It was, however, meticulously researched. Kitty's purchase of silk stockings for twelve shillings a pair was a detail she had noted in Jane Austen's letters. In addition, the fact that Meg's husband, Lord Buckhaven, has just left with Lord Amherst on his embassy to China dates the year in which the story is set as 1816.

== Bibliography ==
- Jane Aiken Hodge, The Private World of Georgette Heyer (1984), republished by Source Books, 2011
- Jennifer Kloester, Georgette Heyer (2011), Source Books 2013
