= Gibson G-101 =

Portable electronic organ

Gibson G101
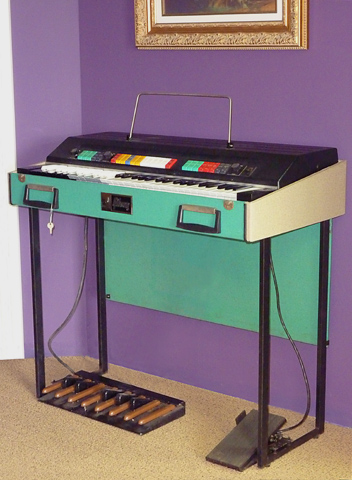
- Manufacturer: Gibson
- Dates: 1967 – 1969

Technical specifications
- Polyphony: Full
- Synthesis type: Electronic

Input/output
- Keyboard: 61 keys

The Gibson G-101 (or Gibson Portable Organ, also known as the Kalamazoo K-101) is a transistorised combo organ, manufactured in the late 1960s by the Lowrey Organ Company for Gibson.

The G-101 was produced in response to similar combo organs such as the Vox Continental and Farfisa, though it had a wider range of features such as foldback as seen on a Hammond organ. It provided a 61-key manual with a variety of stops accessed by rocker switches and a separate bass system. Because the organ was manufactured by Lowrey, the G-101 can create similar sounds to that company's console organs manufactured at the time. The instrument was not as commercially successful as the Continental and Farfisa, and less than 2,000 models were sold. However, it was used by some popular musicians at the time, particularly The Doors' Ray Manzarek.

== Production ==
The instrument was introduced by Gibson in 1967 but produced in the U.S. for them by the Lowrey Organ Company. Both companies were owned by Chicago Musical Instruments. Lowrey had already produced several combo organs, beginning in 1946. The G-101 was first introduced in 1966 as the Kalamazoo K-101, as that name was used by Gibson for its budget range of equipment. The name was changed to Gibson G-101 shortly thereafter, in order to encourage sales, and production continued until 1969. A Gibson G-201 organ was introduced at the same time, which is a spinet organ with two manuals, but otherwise has the same electronics, but not as many features.

The original price was $995 ($9,600 as of 2025), which was one of the most expensive single-manual combo organs at that time. Less than 2,000 models were produced (about a quarter of the Vox Continental), making the instrument a sought-after model for collectors compared to similar instruments.

== Features ==
Despite the change in name badges and model numbers shortly after its introduction, the Kalamazoo K-101 and the Gibson G-101 are the same instrument. Kalamazoo was a brand name that Gibson used for budget instruments. The only significant change in production was a cast Gibson logo added to the instrument's front panel.

The G-101 had two square, tubular, fold-out legs, and a "drop panel". The panel supported the legs, via secured thumb screws, and acted as a cover for them during transport. Other external features included an acrylonitrile butadiene styrene (ABS) black plastic top, a tri-colored plastic keyboard, color-coded rocker-switch tabs, and a vinyl fabric-covered plywood cabinet, drop panel, and lid, using an aqua-and-gray color scheme. While superficially similar in appearance to many other combo organs in the 1960s such as the Farfisa Compact, it can easily be distinguished from competing models by identifying the cabinet colors.

Three optional accessories were available for the G-101: a travel bag, an expression pedal (volume pedal), and a set of bass pedals. The expression pedal is required, as without it, the organ will make no sound (though this can be fixed by changing the internal wiring). The volume pedal had a spring-loaded side-lever that could be used to actuate the "Glide" and "Trumpet Wow-wow" effects. In addition to a standard 1/4" jack socket for a standard amplifier, an additional jack also enabled users to connect to a custom external reverb unit made by Gibson or Maestro. The "Reverb" tab is used to activate this; the organ itself has no onboard reverb unit. The instrument's top had a removable, fold-down wire rack for sheet music.

The G-101 was designed to be easily serviceable. The internal arrangement of the instrument's electronics makes it easy to find and fix components. Some parts are hinge-mounted, to allow easy access to others.

== Sound ==
The G-101 has a single manual of five octaves (61 keys), divided into three sections. The bottom octave is for bass, using reverse-colored white-on-black keys similar to those on the Vox Continental and the bass section of Farfisa Compact combo organs. The next octave has gray and white keys and could be used as either a second bass octave or an extension of the main voice, like a Farfisa. The top three octaves uses the main (treble) voices.

The main section offers 16', 8', 4' and 2 2/3' footages, with reed, string and flute voices. There is also a mixture tab that combines 4' and 2 2/3' tones. From left to right, the controls are:

- Rotary knob for bass volume
- Five tabs (color-coded) for bass:

- (Green) String Bass; Sax Bass; Fuzz Bass
- (Gray) Bass Normal/Percuss.; Bass Sustain Off/On

- Rotary switch to select extended bass or treble for the gray keys
- Twelve tabs, (color-coded) for voicings on the treble keys:

- (Red) Glide Normal/Trumpet Wow-Wow
- (Yellow) Trombone 16'(Piano S-St-P); Clarinet 16's
- (Blue) String 8'(Harpcd S-St-P)
- (Yellow) Trumpet 8'; Kinura 8'
- (White) Flute 16'; Flute 8'; Piccolo 4'; Nazard 2-2/3'; Mixture
- (Red) Brilliance Normal/Full

- Eight tabs (color-coded) for effects:

- (Green) Vibrato Slow/Fast; Vibrato Light/Heavy; Vibrato Off/On
- (Red) Sustain S Med; Sustain SS Long; Staccato St Off/On
- (Gray) Reverb Off/On; Percuss. Off/On

- Rotary knob to control Repeat Off/On/Rate

Because the G-101 was manufactured by Lowrey, its electronics – and thus, its voicings – are similar to Lowrey's own T-1 and T-2 models (all of which use the same generator boards as the Lowrey TLO ["Holiday"] spinet models); the G-101 is not, however, identical and does contain several additional distinctive features. Like other combo organs, the G-101 uses twelve individual tone generators with a frequency divider to create the other notes. These are routed through a sequence of filters activated by the various tabs on the instrument, which gives it a wider range of sounds than a Vox.

The G-101 features strong and bright voices, which when combined with sustain, can cut through a mix to be the dominant instrument in a band. Like a Hammond, but unlike most combo organs, using the high voices such as Nazard 2 2/3, the tones are duplicated as audio foldback. This allowed Lowrey to cut costs as they did not need as many tone generator circuits as would have been required otherwise. The "Repeat" feature sounds similar to tremolo, but uses a re-triggering circuit on the percussion board instead; the knob can be used to control its off/on and speed rate. This feature often faded in functionality because it used a photodetector which contained a neon bulb that could dim over time, but this is fixable by locating and installing an appropriate replacement part.

The "Glide" effect pitches the notes flat by a semitone when actuated by the side-lever on the expression pedal when the "Glide" tab was selected to "Normal". When the same tab is selected to "Trumpet Wow-wow", the side-lever actuates a "wah wah" effect. The "Piano" and "Harpsichord" tabs simulate the tones of those instruments. The tones can be given additional attack (note-onset time) when the "Percussion" and "Staccato" tabs are selected, producing a piano-like "bounce". The "Sustain" can be used on these latter two voices to continue sounding for a while after the note is released.

== Notable users ==
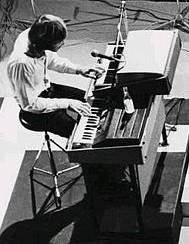
Ray Manzarek playing a Gibson G-101 and Rhodes Piano Bass in 1968

The most prominent user of the G-101 was The Doors' Ray Manzarek, who switched from the Vox Continental to the G-101 during the recording of Waiting for the Sun in 1968. Manzarek later said the G-101 "had a little more versatility than the Vox; it could make the sort of piano-ish sound I used on "Back Door Man" (from The Doors album); plus, it had a little knob sticking up on the volume pedal which could bend the note a half-step down. We used it on "Not to Touch the Earth". Even synthesizers don't really do that." Another important reason for using the G-101 was because it had a flat top, which meant he could put a Rhodes Piano Bass on top of it, to play basslines in concert. The instrument has consequently become sought-after by Doors tribute bands to authentically replicate the original group's look and sound.

Jazz musician Sun Ra also began using the G-101 during the 1960s. The first documented use is on the Atlantis album, which was released in 1969. Ra, who often invented names for his instruments, lists the G-101 as the "Solar Sound Organ" in the credits. Don Preston used a G-101 with Frank Zappa and the Mothers of Invention, and was seen playing one on the cover of his solo album Filters, Oscillators & Envelopes 1967–75.
