= List of Lowrey organs =

Lowrey organs were originally made in Chicago, Illinois (prior to 2011) and have been played in churches and by professional and home musicians since the 1950s. Lowrey entered the portable keyboard market in the early 1980s with the Wandering Genie, which was succeeded by the Japanese-made Micro Genie line. In January 2019, Kawai, the owner of the brand, announced it would cease all production of Lowrey Organs. This list of models is incomplete.

== Organs ==
Image	Model Name / Number	Years sold new	Description
	Berkshire Deluxe TBO-1	1968	Organ with 2 44 key manuals, 13 bass pedals, built-in spring reverb, Leslie effect, and marimba effect famously known from Baba O'Riley by the Who played by Pete Townshend. The TBO-1 is a slightly upgraded version of the older but otherwise identical Berkshire TBO (1966).
	Carnival (C500)	1978	Automatic bass, rhythm and accompaniment. Two keyboards and bass pedals.
	Coronation		
	Cotillion	1983	Theatre organ with memory presets and extensive features, including human voices and other sound effects.
	Debut (L-65)	1981	
	Debut (L-70)	1982	Featured two keyboards and Magic Genie.
	DSO / DSO- / DSO-1	Unknown; 1962 at earliest	Home spinet organ. Two 3½-octave manuals and 1-octave pedals. Includes Leslie tremolo, a chime effect stop, and a "glide" switch on the side of the volume pedal. There is also an Automatic Orchestra tab witch adds chord tones from the lower keyboard to the upper keyboard. The "-1" adds a repeat function.
	Encore (M-100)	1979	
	Festival	1960-1966	Two 61-note keyboards. 25 bass pedals. Features Automatic Orchestra, glide control, percussion and "Moving Stereo" controls.
	GAKH25 / GAK25H/ Citation Theatre Console	1972-1983	Theater Organ Spinet Console with 2 manuals 61 keys each and a 25 key pedalboard. Features an internal Leslie Speaker and a tape deck. It also would come in walnut wood.
	Genie (L-5)	1972-79	Featured walking basses and rhythm section. One finger play.
	Genie (L-10)	1979	
	Genie (L-15)	1979	
	Genie 44	1975	
	Genie 88	1975	
	Genie 98	1975	
	Genius		
	Fiesta (L25)	1982-1984	
	Heritage		
	Holiday	1966-1983	
	Holiday (D-325)	1978	Two keyboards with Magic Genie.
	Holiday Deluxe	1972-1974	
	Jamboree (TG 88)	1978-1979	
	Journey	2010s	
	Jupiter	1974	Featured Automatic Orchestra and Leslie Speaker.
	LC-88	1980	
	Liberty Star		the most feature loaded comprehensive double full keyboard console unit ever made, giant, wooden arced design
	Mardi Gras (L-55)	1982-1983	Featured four channels, double keyboard and Magic Genie chords.
	MX-1	1981-1984	
	Organo	1956	60-note organ for attaching to a "standard piano"
	Pageant (M-150)	1982	
	Parade	1981	
	Saturn Deluxe	1974	
	Spinet	1956	
	Stereo Jubilee	1977	
	Stereo Genie 98-1	1977	Features Automatic Organ Computer and Lowrey Glide.
	Super Genie	1974-1975	
	Symphonic Holiday	1975-1977	Four channels, 88 keys, two keyboards, Magic Genie.
	Teenie Genie	1974-1976	Rhythm and auto-bass pedal accompaniment.
	TG44-1	1977	Two keyboards and bass pedals.
	TG44BK	1977	Two keyboards, pedals and built in cassette recorder.
	TG98		
	TGB	1977	
	Theatre HR-98		Complete professional theatre organ.
	Venus	1974	

== Portable organs ==
Some of Lowrey's portable organs were made in Japan and based on JVC designs.

Image	Model Name / Number	Years produced	Description
	L-2 Wandering Genie	1980-1982	Portable organ with Genie accompaniment. Effects include variable sustain, "repeat" setting with adjustable tempo and "glide" (single-tone pitch bender).
	Micro Genie V60		Rebranded version of JVC KB-300/KB-303.
	Micro Genie V100		49 keys. 8 note polyphony. Rebranded version of JVC KB-500.
	Micro Genie V101	1982-1987	49 keys. 8 note polyphony. Rebranded version of JVC KB-500.
	Micro Genie V120	1985-	61 full sized keys. Rebranded version of JVC KB-700.
	Micro Genie V105	1986-	Hybrid of JVC KB-600 & KB-800. Features include MIDI in and out, AUX in and out, MIC in with adjustable gain. Expression pedal input.
	Micro Genie V125		Rebranded version of JVC KB-808.
	Micro Genie Pro V600		49 keys. Programmable. MIDI in and out. Came with "guitar strum" accessory. Rebranded version of JVC KB-800.
