= HMS Cotillion =

HMS Cotillion has been the name of two Royal Navy vessels of the 20th century:

- HMS Cotillion (1917), a Dance-class minesweeper of World War I
- HMS Cotillion (T104), a Dance-class trawler of World War II

== See also ==
- Cotillion, a French square dance
