= Combo organ =

Type of electric organ

A combo organ, so-named and classified by popular culture due to its original intended use by small, touring jazz, pop and dance groups known as "combo bands", as well as some models having "Combo" as part of their brand or model names, is an electronic organ of the frequency divider type, generally produced between the early 1960s and the late 1970s. This type of organ predated, and contributed largely to, the development of modern synthesizers. The combo organ concept, at least in the context of mass-production, is thought to have arisen from popular demand, when smaller home organs were seen in music stores. Combo organs were probably originally developed in the United Kingdom, based on the Univox polyphonic version of the Clavioline, and some models included the inner-workings of Italian-made transistor accordions. They were the brainchild of necessity for portable organs of simple design, mainly for use in these small groups. Combo organs ended up having a major impact on the music scene of the mid- and late 1960s, particularly on rock and roll of that era.

A combo organ could best be defined as "a portable electric organ designed to be used by a musical combo".

== Details ==
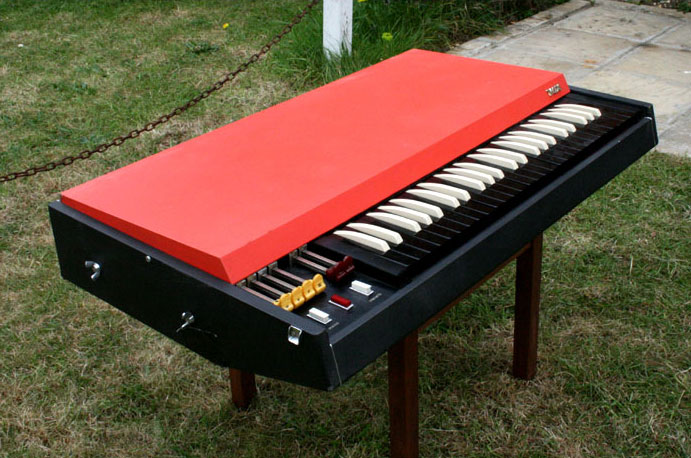
A Continental organ by Vox, the same model heard on "Light My Fire" by The Doors and "In-A-Gadda-Da-Vida" by Iron Butterfly.

A combo organ is an electronic portable organ, usually transistorized (although some older designs used tubes; and later models, integrated circuits), that was designed for use on stage, usually in the context of a band or group. A combo organ is usually supported on a removable or folding stand or legs; these originally would have been supplied as part of the instrument. Combo organs were best known for their bright, reedy sound; their portability; surprising versatility; and relatively low cost. Most such instruments have no built-in amplification.

A typical combo organ has one manual (keyboard), covering four or five octaves, though a few models had two manuals of three or four octaves. A number of different pitches and tone-colours ("voices") were featured, often using rocker-switches, tabs or drawbars to function as "stops" to select them. Although the sounds may bear such names as "flute", "string" or "horn", they are not intended to sound like their orchestral namesakes - the nomenclature is borrowed from pipe organ tradition. Some instruments allow the keyboard to be split, the lowest octave or two producing a pedal-like bass tone. Most combo organs offer vibrato as a special effect; a few feature more unusual effects such as "repeat percussion" (tremolo), "slalom" (pitch bend) or wah-wah. A volume pedal is normally used to vary the volume while playing. Less frequently an optional set of bass pedals could be attached.

Soundwise, combo organs are very similar to each other, although there are definite discernible tonal characteristics that differ between models that might be considered "default" for each model. For instance, the Vox Continental tends toward having somewhat of a Hammond-like, or "sine wave"-like sound (only thinner); while the Farfisa Combo Compact has an aggressive, raspy quality to some of its boosted tones, and the Gibson G-101 has a cleaner, contoured, more "sawtooth wave"-like tone, with harpsichord-like, percussive sound capabilities and a slight "after-jingle", with Sustain selected, on some voice settings.

To collectors, players and enthusiasts, the visual aesthetic is often as important as the sound. Originally, the instruments were often available in bright and unusual colors (orange, blue, bright red, green) with showy chrome legs, multi-colored stop-tabs, and reverse-colored or gray-and-white keys. Towards the mid-1970s, combo organs began to take on a more muted appearance, with woodgrain or black covering and conventional keyboard colors. Many combo organs were produced in such countries as Italy or Japan, yet some more common models used by major acts were manufactured in the United Kingdom or the United States. Organs that are intended to emulate the sound and characteristics of a Hammond organ are not generally regarded as combo organs; see clonewheel organ.

-- They have been sold to the public from 1946 to present, beginning in Germany with Jorgensen Electronics then gradually spreading worldwide by the 1960s. Kinds of tone generation have included tube or transistor analog oscillators & dividers, mechanoelectrical sources such as a few Hammond tonewheel combo models in 1969 & a Noble amplified reed combo organ in 1966, with fully digital beginning in 1974 and since becoming the predominant type. They have been made with one to three keyboards. Sounds, styles, and features vary greatly.

== Models ==
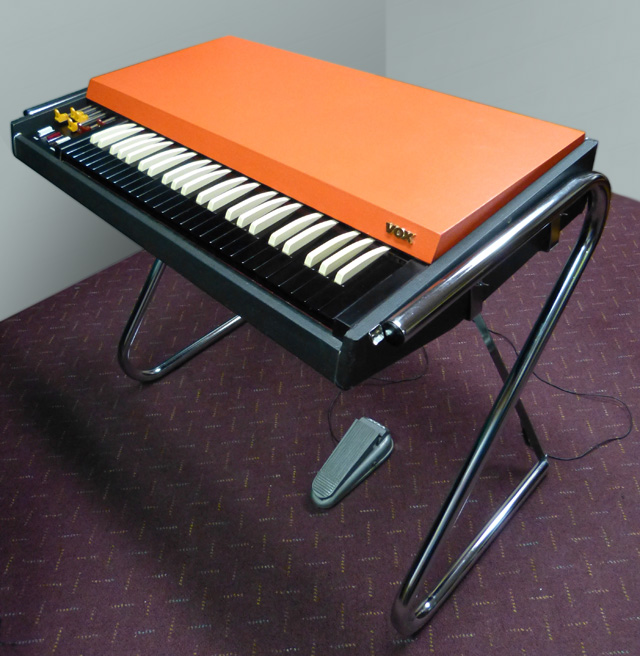
Vox Continental

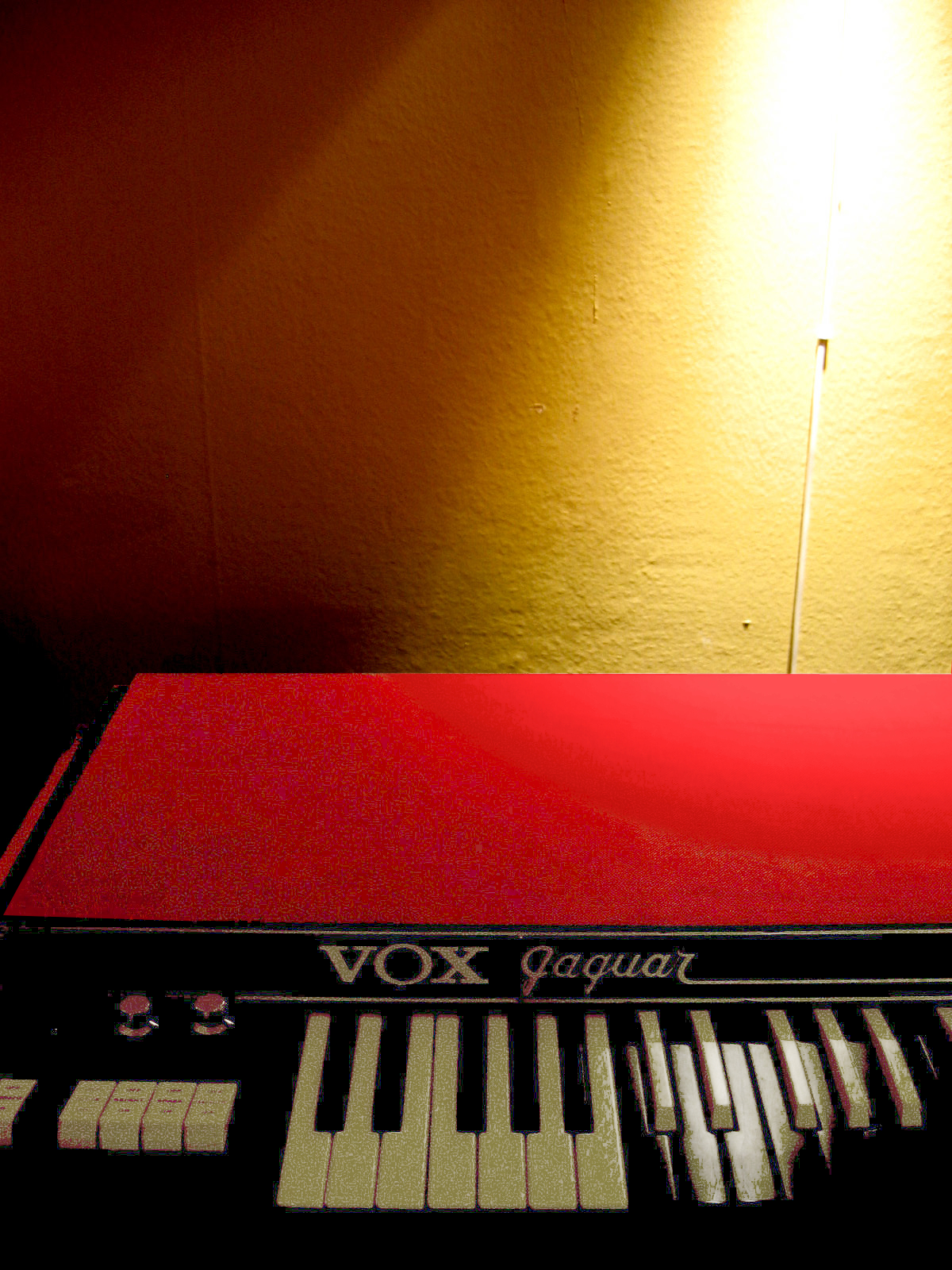
Vox Jaguar

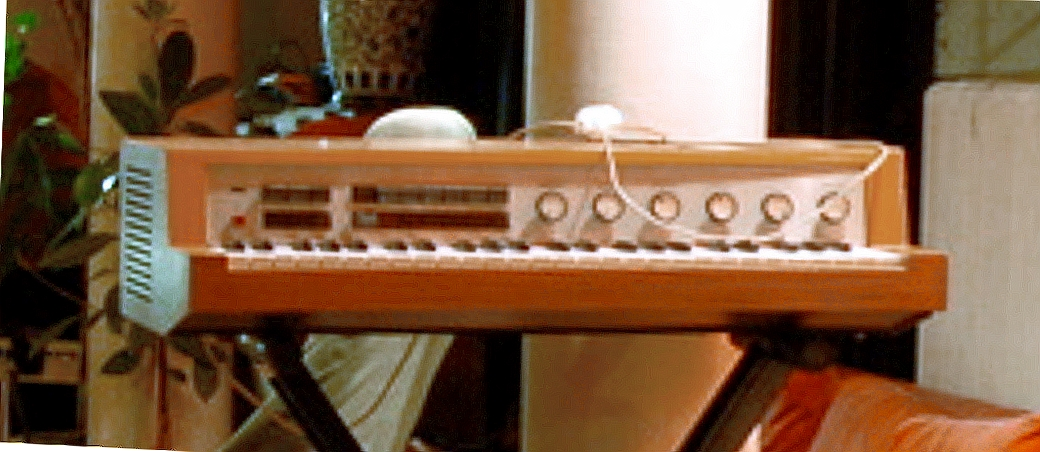
Philips Philicorda

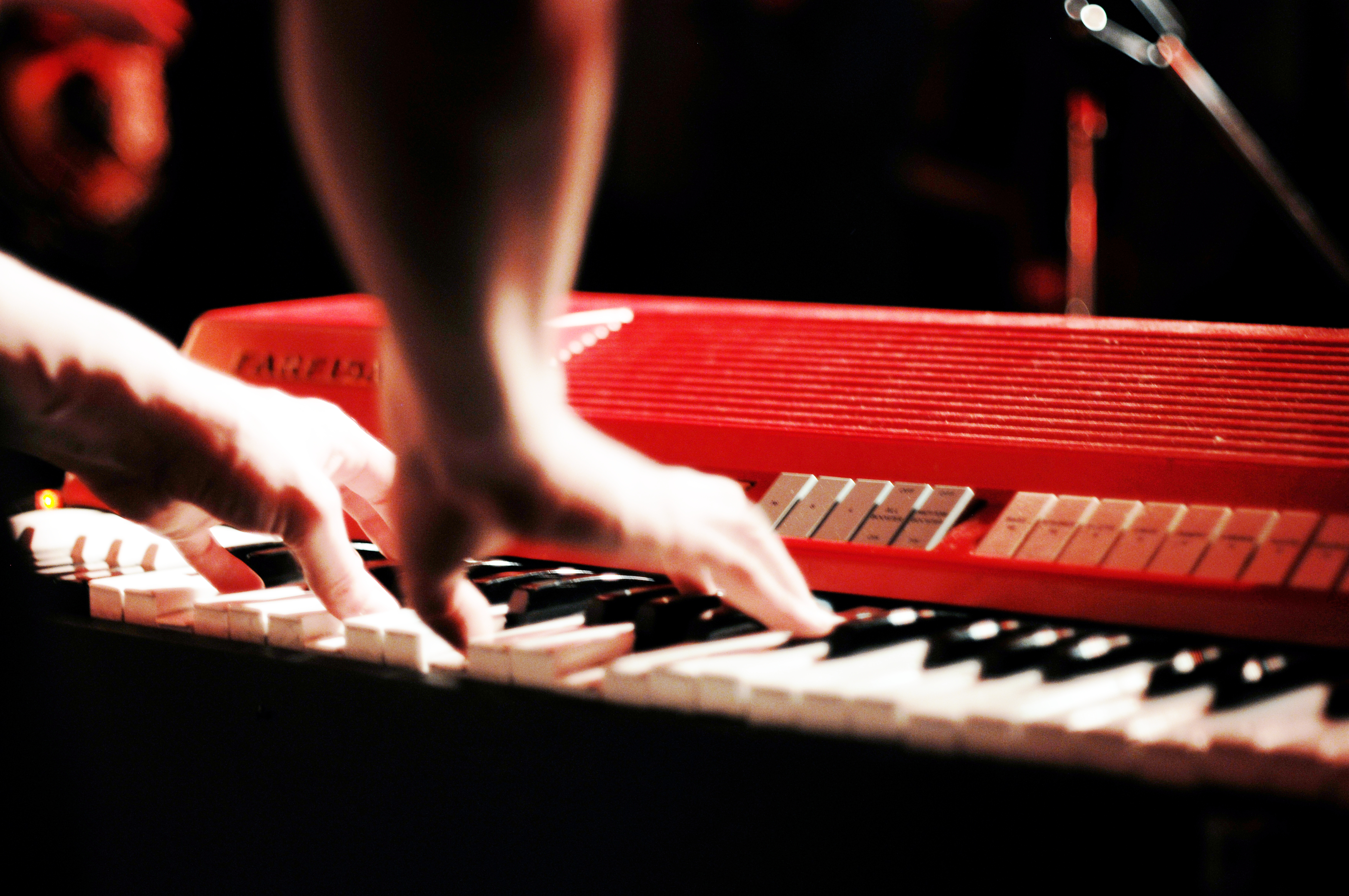
Farfisa Combo Compact

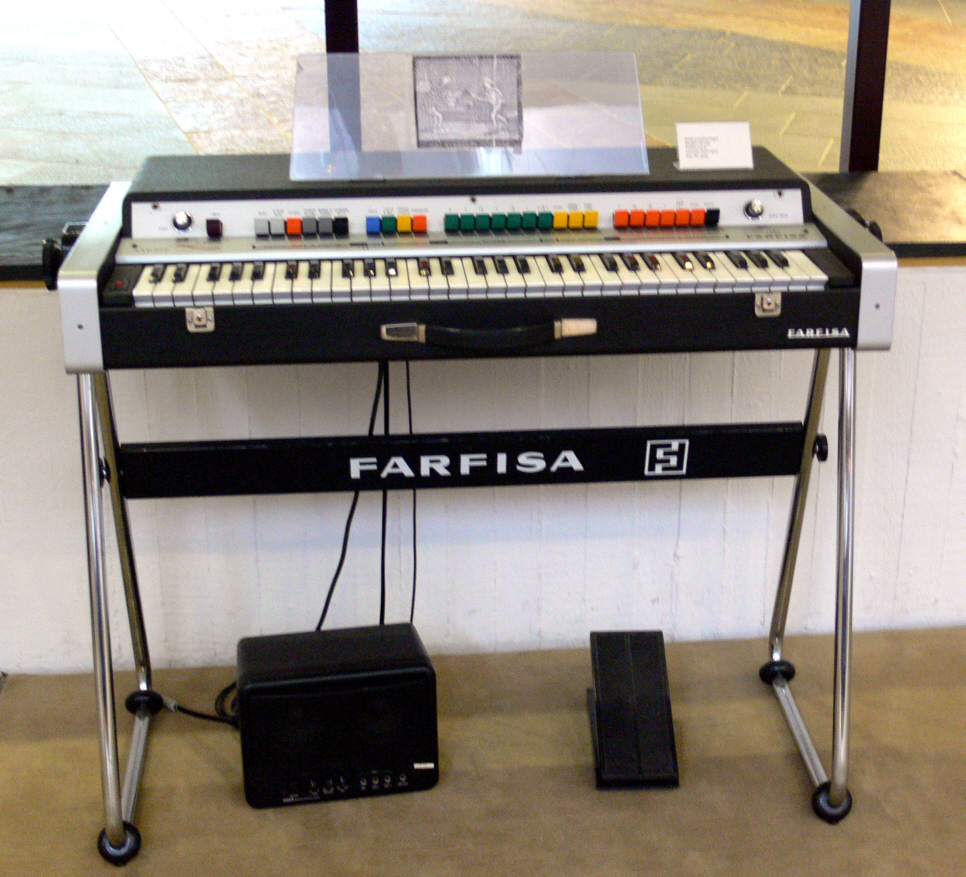
Farfisa VIP

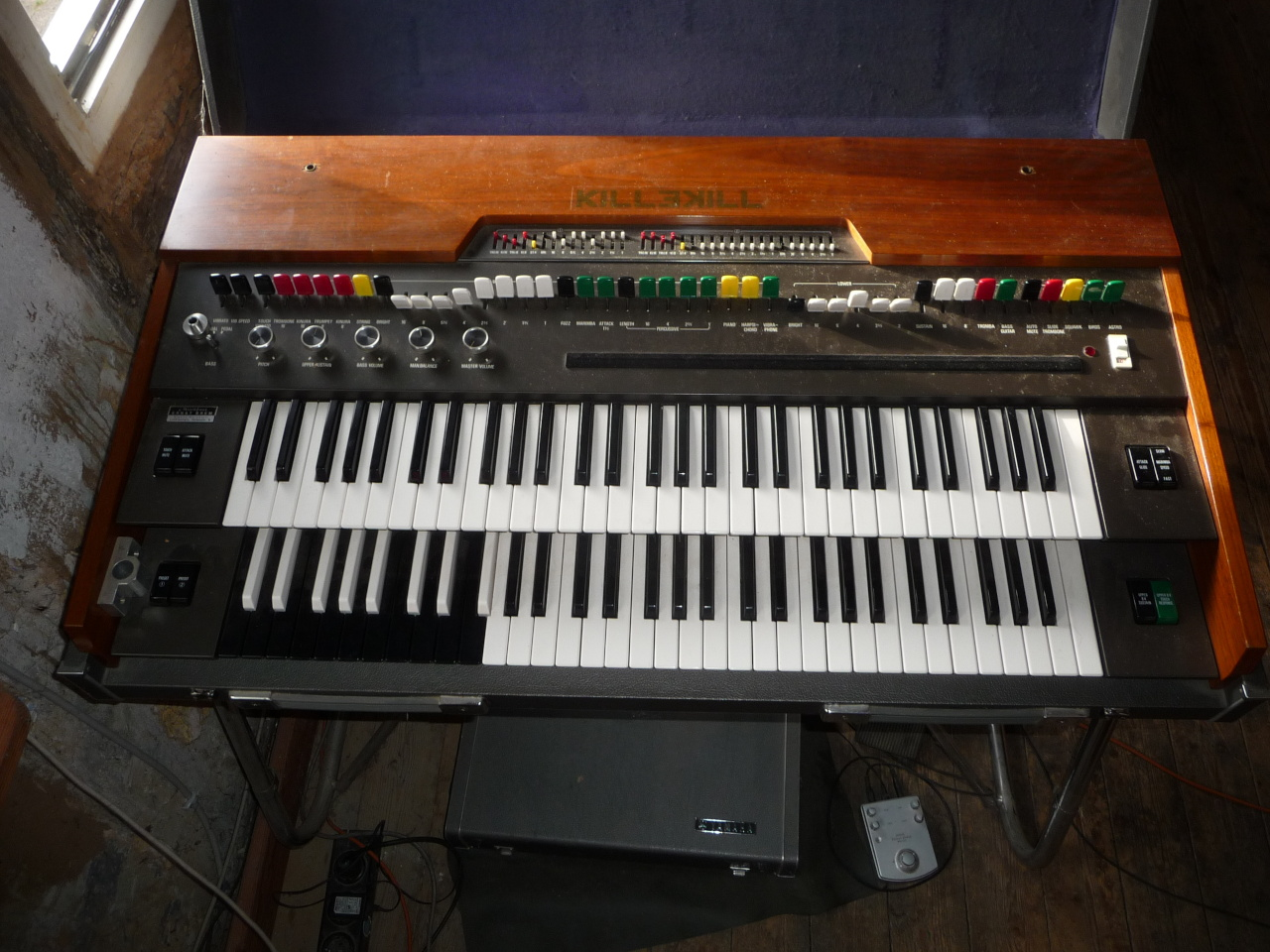
Yamaha YC-45D

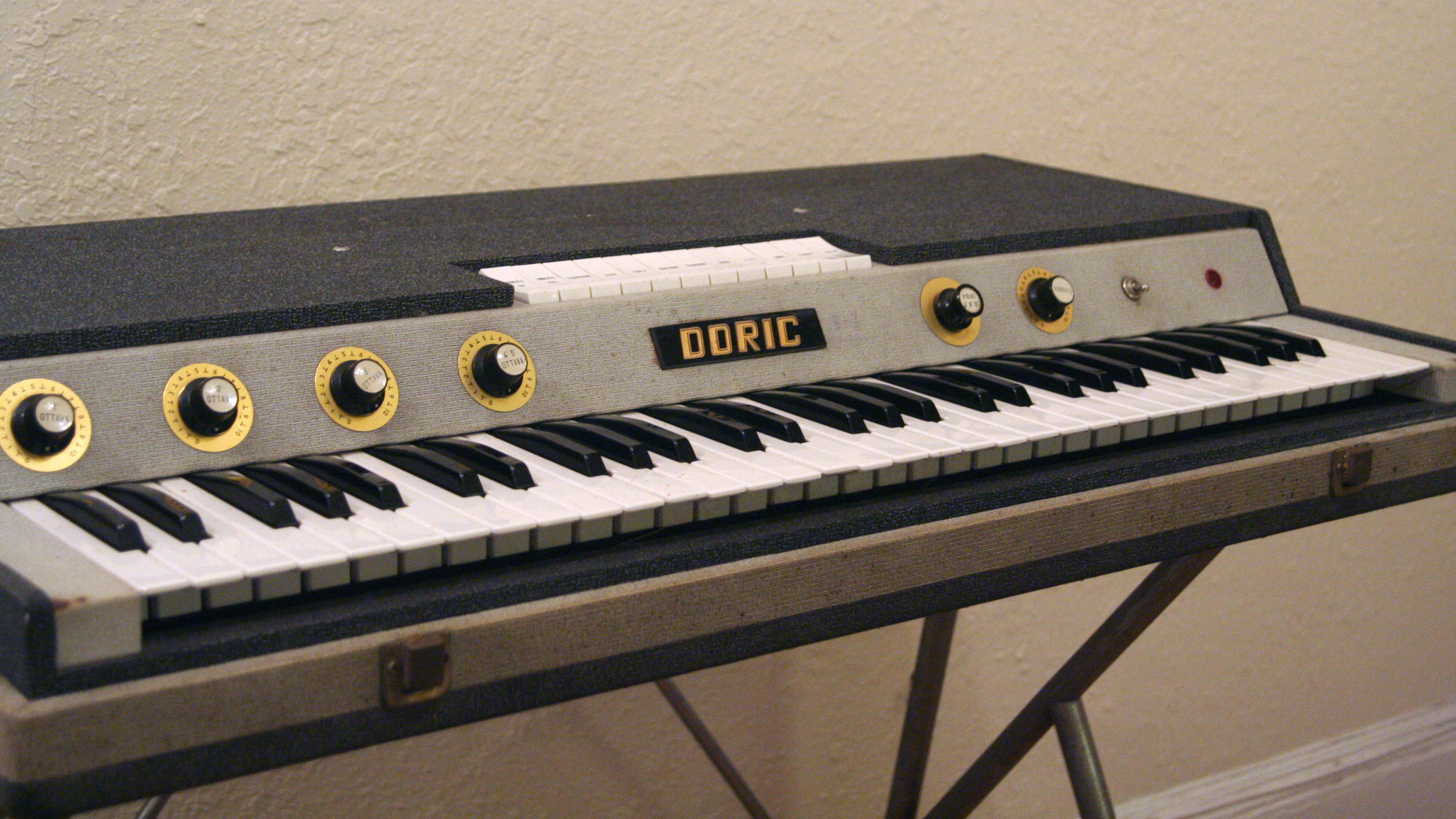
Doric 61TT

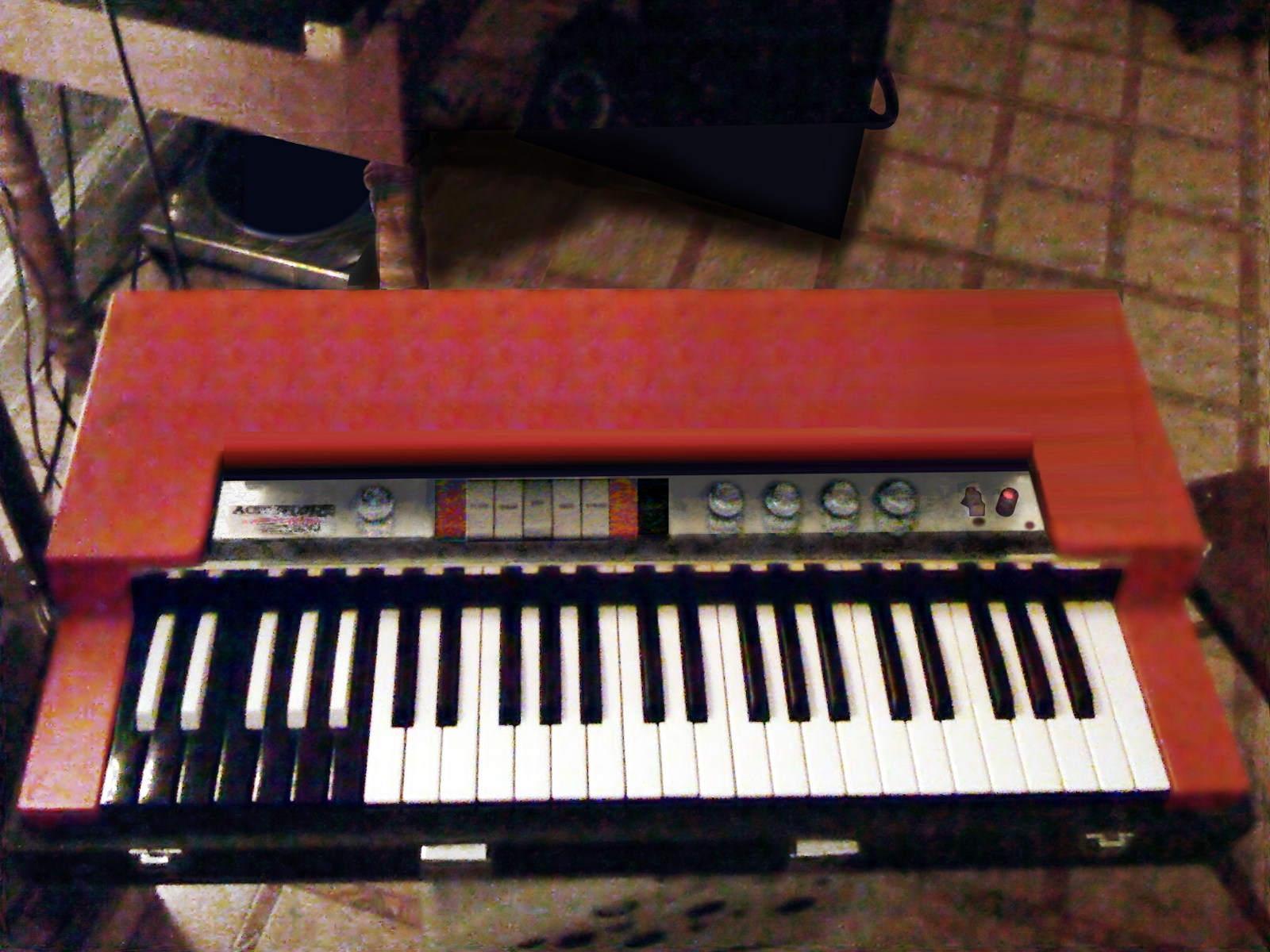
Ace Tone TOP-1

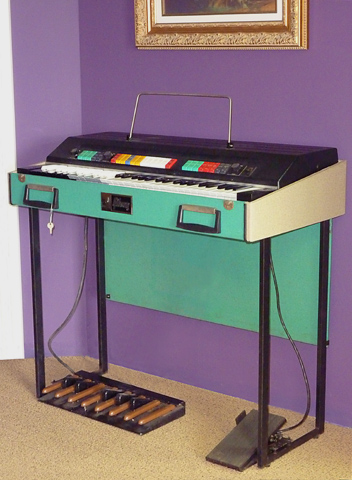
Gibson G101

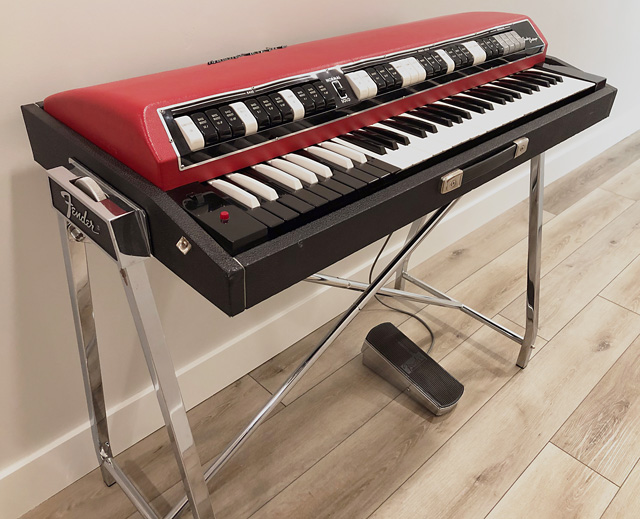
Fender Contempo

Well-known combo organs include:

- Vox Continental (UK, USA, Italy)
- Vox Jaguar (Italy)
- Philicorda by Philips (Netherlands)
- Farfisa Combo Compact series (Italy)
- Farfisa Professional, VIP and FAST series (Italy)
- Yamaha A3 and YC series (Japan)
- Doric Organ (Italy)
- Ace Tone "TOP" series (Japan)
- Gibson G-101 (USA)
- Fender Contempo (USA)

== Popularity ==
The combo organ's greatest popularity was during the 1960s, when it was featured on hits by The Doors, The Animals, Iron Butterfly, Manfred Mann, Them, Strawberry Alarm Clock, and many others. It was the main instrument of Pink Floyd's Richard Wright, from 1966 to 1973. Although the instrument fell from favor during the 1970s, there was a resurgence about 1977 when new wave artists such as Blondie, Elvis Costello, Talking Heads and XTC used them. More recently, vintage combo organs have been used by The Horrors, Stereolab, Pulp, Kaiser Chiefs and Arctic Monkeys.
