= BX3 =

BX3 may refer to:

- BX3 (gene)
- Korg CX-3, musical organ, one version being the BX-3
- Bx3 (New York City bus)
