= Swedish Game Awards =

Video game award competition

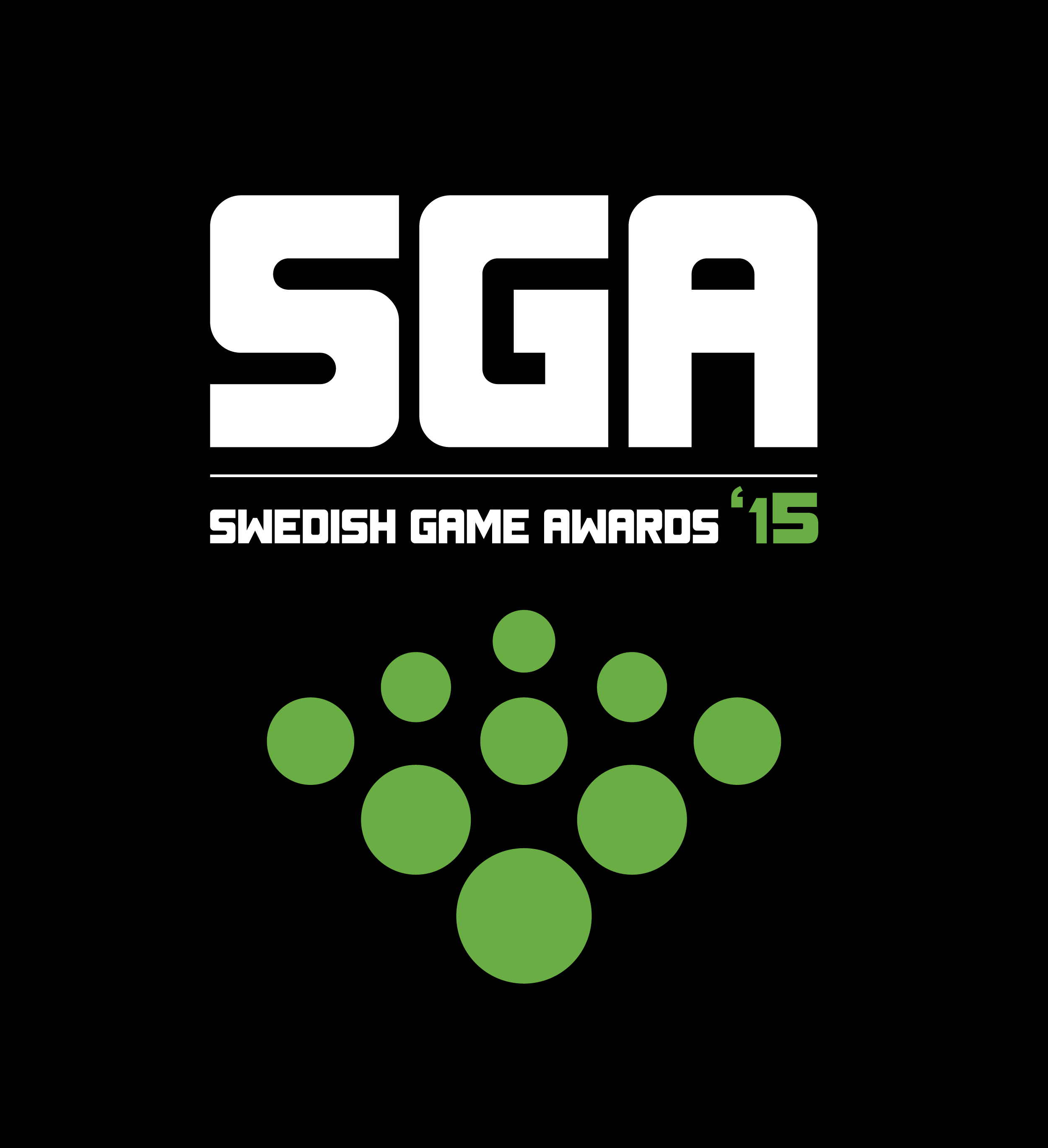
- Type: Non-profit organization
- Industry: Video game awards
- Founded: 2002
- Headquarters: Stockholm, Sweden
- Parent: Excitera
- Website: www.gameawards.se

Swedish Game Awards is Sweden's largest video game development competition. It has been held annually since 2002 and is organized by the student-driven, non-profit entrepreneurship association at the Royal Institute of Technology, Excitera. The competition's audience is students at Swedish universities and high schools, particularly those studying game development and software engineering. Funding is handled through partnerships with various software and game development companies, e.g. Digital Illusions CE and Sun Microsystems.

== History ==
Swedish Game Awards started in 2002 as a PC-only game competition under the name KTH Game Awards, and was targeted mainly at students in the Stockholm area. KTH Game Awards was founded by the KTH students Yashar Moradbakhti, Bartek Gudowski, Mikael Pommert and Andreas Harju. In 2004, KTH Game Awards was merged with another competition organized by Excitera, called the Excitera Mobile Award. This led to the creation of special class for mobile phone games. After its first iteration, the name was changed to Swedish Game Awards to reflect the increase in scope from local to national competition, as well as the fact that the competition had grown to be the largest of its kind in Sweden.

In 2014 the competitions hosts changed from students of Royal Institute of Technology to students of Södertörn University (while still maintaining its cooperation with Excitera).

In 2015 the competition added the category Best Diversity Effort as a result of their co-operation with Diversi to reflect the games industry's increasing interest in variation of its developers and consumers. The final day of the competition also had its first livestream on YouTube by cooperating with students of Medieinstitutet to make the announcement of the winners available directly to the public. It also broke the previous record of submitted games in 2014 (which was 98) with 104 games.

The competition has gradually gained recognition from Swedish game development companies and universities as a way for students to show their game development capabilities and thus increase their chances of getting employment within the video game industry.

== Competition Award History ==
=== Current Categories ===
==== Game of the Year ====
2026: Arc Raiders
2024: Traum
2023: Eclipsium
2022: Out of Sight
2021: The Tale of the Greenhouse
2020: -
2019: Adiasis
2018: Cateau
2017: Rope's Adventure
2016: Notes of Obsession
2015: Adventure on Clover island
2014: Defunct
2013: Epigenesis
2012: Secrets of Grindea
2011: Dead Meets Lead
2010: Dwarfs!?
2009: Bloodline Champions
2008: Magicka
2007: Puzzlegeddon
2006: Dawnspire: Prelude
2005: CrazyBall
2004: Saga of Ina
2003: Xazzon

==== Best Audio ====
2026: Arc Raiders
2017: Pick your potion
2016: Notes of Obsession
2015: Sons of Eye Championship
2014: Beat It

==== Best Art ====
2026: The Midnight Walk
2017: Pump the Frog
2016: Super Neon Drifter
2015: Adventure on Clover island
2014: Piggy

==== Best Game Design ====
2026: Arc Raiders
2017: Rope's Adventure
2016: Cryptogram
2015: Frog Climbers
2014: Cubetrip

==== Independent Game Of The Year ====
2026: Keep Driving

==== Best Multiplayer ====
2026: Split Fiction

==== Best Small Screen / Mobile Game ====
2026: Grand Mountain Adventure 2
2013: Dungeon Heroes
2012: Forlorn
2011: Block Breaker
2010: Phoenix Spirit
2008: Swarm by Kian Bashiri
2007: Magnotix
2006: Quantum
2005: Ice Cakes

==== Best Technology ====
2026: Arc Raiders
2017: Pick your Potion
2016: Cryptogram
2015: Rymdstenar
2014: Magnetic

==== Best Live Service ====
2026: Minecraft

==== Best Foreign Game Of The Year ====
2026: Clair Obscur: Expedition 33

==== Players' Game Of The Year ====
2026: Europa Universalis V
2017: Penny's Farm
2016: Lance A Lot
2015: Frog Climbers
2014: Flash and crash
2013: Fly or Die
2012: Build 'n' Break
2010: Eggnappers
2009: Conquer the Hood
2008: Boingo

=== Previous Categories ===
==== Best Execution in Narrative ====
2018: Cateau
2017: Eyes Align
2016: Cryptogram
2015: Adal's Vikings
2014: Siege of Stockholm

==== Best Diversity Effort ====
2017: Softa med Oss: the last assignment
2016: Sam and Nicole
2015: Iris & Earl

==== Best Execution ====
2013: Little Warlock
2012: ---
2011: ---
2010: Br00t4l Qwest
2009: Imperii
2008: Boingo

==== Best Mobile Execution ====
2018: Cosette's Cassettes

==== Best Innovation ====
2013: King of the Thrill
2012: Blobbz Online
2011: Zap the Bugs
2010: Block Tower Wars
2009: Carpet Wrestling
2008: Blueberry Garden
2007: Fret Nice
2006: Sumo
2005: Promqueen
2004: War, Siege & Conquest

==== Miscellaneous Awards ====
2015: Game of the Year Nominees: The Hungry Maw From Outer Space, Frog Climbers, Rymdresa
2013: Best Scenario: Grief
2011: Jury honour nomination: Unmechanical
2010: Best Web Game: Continuity
2009: Best XNA game: Bloodline Champions
2009: Best Java FX: Imperii
2007: Best XNA game: Gravitron Ultra
2007: Jury honour nomination: Streambolt Desero, Boiler, Raven Tale
2007: Best PC game runner up: Harvest: Massive Encounter
2007: Best mobile game runner up: Heximon
2006: Jury honour nomination: Deadbolt
2005: Sony Ericsson Mobile Java 3D Award: 3D Cube
2004: Jury honour nomination: Hockey

== Current Competition ==
The 2014-2015 competition is organized by a team of Stockholm-based university students in various fields related to game design.
In its 13th year, the Swedish Game Awards continues annually to draw greater numbers of entries from student-development teams across Sweden.

=== Rules ===
The parameters to the competition have remained relatively stable over the years, aimed toward providing a launching pad for talented, independent, student game developers to develop new and marketable games.
The official rules are available at http://gameawards.se/competition/rules.

=== Event Timeline ===
The process of the Swedish Game Awards spans the majority of each academic year. Beginning in October with the SGA Kickoff, previous winners, current jury members, and corporate sponsors are invited to present their perspectives of the game industry and the Swedish Game Awards in particular to the upcoming year's participants. Also at this time, the various award categories are announced. The competition submissions are developed by independent teams during the year, culminating in a Jury Weekend and Grand Finale party in late May.

In the early months of the competition, the SGA Tour also occurs. During the tour, representatives from the Swedish Game Awards visit universities and technical schools across the country to engage with competition participants.

=== Partners ===
==== Main Partners ====
King (company), DICE, Arrowhead Game Studios, Sweden Game Arena Autodesk

==== Gold Partners ====
MAG Interactive

==== Silver Partners ====
Paradox Interactive, Epic Games

==== Bronze Partners ====
Rovio Entertainment, Avalanche Studios

=== Current Categories ===
Game of the Year

Best Audio

Best Art

Best Game Design
Independent Game Of The Year
Best Multiplayer
Best Small Screen / Mobile Game

Best Technology
Best Live Service
Foregin Game Of The Year
Players' Game Of The Year

== Previous Competition ==
=== Previous Partners ===
Here is a list of previous partners that have sponsored the Swedish Game Awards in some way in the past.

==== Previous Main Partners ====
HP, Intel, ARM, Epic Games, King (company)

==== Previous Gold Partners ====
DICE, Arrowhead Game Studios, Rovio Entertainment, Mali DEVELOPER CENTER

==== Previous Silver Partners ====
Paradox Interactive, DICE, Wooga, Stardoll, Fondia, Grand Cru Games

==== Previous Bronze Partners ====
Autodesk, Easy Studios, Junebud, Gamers Gate, Swedish National Defence College, Avalanche Studios, Bitsquid, Hansoft

==== Previous Event Partners ====
EasyTryck.se

==== Previous Media Partners ====
The Square (publication)

=== Previous Awards ===
Best Execution

Best Innovation

Best Mobile Game

Best Scenario

Best Serious Game
