= Secrets of Grindea =

2024 video game

- Publisher: Pixel Ferrets
- Programmer: Teddy Sjöström
- Artists: Fred Ström; Vilya Svensson
- Composer: Andrew Riley
- Engine: Microsoft XNA
- Platform: Microsoft Windows
- Release: February 29, 2024
- Genre: Action game; adventure game; role-playing video game
- Mode: Co-op mode; multiplayer; single-player

Secrets of Grindea is an action-adventure video game developed and published by Pixel Ferrets. It was released on February 29, 2024 for Microsoft Windows.

== Gameplay ==
Secrets of Grindea takes place in the land of Grindea. The game follows the story of a young Collector setting out on an adventure to explore the land and find and collect as many things as they can find. These Collectors are people tasked with finding and collecting various artifacts, and you become one of them by passing the test held every year in the capital city of Evergrind. The protagonist is joined by a sapient talking artifact known as Bag. The player character's stats and abilities can be customised, with skill points as they progress. Enemies may drop cards after defeat, stat-raising items to benefit during combat. For example, a card may increase the chance of dodging or raise attack speed.

== Development ==
Secrets of Grindea was developed by Pixel Ferrets, a small development team. Teddy Sjöström is the game programmer, Fred Ström the animator, and Vilya Svensson created all the non-animated art. Development of the game began in summer 2011. Secret of Grindea's soundtrack was composed by Andrew Riley of Lucky Lion Studios. Sound design for the game was done by Hallvard A. Ulsund and Mariusz Jasionowicz. After being released in early access in 2015, it was fully released in February 2024.

== Reception ==
Reception

Review scores
Publication	Score
Jeuxvideo.com	Bon (Good)
RPGFan	86/100
The Games Machine (Italy)	8.5/10

RPGFan praised the bosses, but criticized the later boss fights as "frustrating". Jeuxvideo.com likened the game to 90s RPGs, but critiqued the length as too short, with it only being five hours long, and yet The Games Machine found the ten hour length reasonable, as there were many activities to do such as arena challenges, an arcade mode, treasure hunts, and the ability to customize your home. Critics praised its pixel artwork and presentation.

Secrets of Grindea won the 2012 Game of the Year at the Swedish Game Awards.
