= Defunct (video game) =

2016 video game

- Developer: Freshly Squeezed
- Publisher: Soedesco
- Designers: Robert Graff; Jonatan Keil
- Programmers: David Forssell; Petter Vernersson
- Artists: Anders Hedström; Mikael Karlsson; Simon Öqvist
- Composer: Joel Forssell
- Engine: Unity
- Platforms: Microsoft Windows, PlayStation 4, Xbox One, Nintendo Switch
- Release: PC: January 29, 2016; PS4: December 19, 2017; Xbox One: December 19, 2017; Nintendo Switch: September 13, 2018
- Genre: Adventure
- Mode: Single-player

Defunct is an indie adventure video game developed by the Swedish indie video game development studio Freshly Squeezed from Visby. The game received several nominations at the 2014 Swedish Game Awards, where it won Game of the Year. It was also nominated for Best Student Project at the 2014 Unity Awards.

In March 2015, it was announced that Freshly Squeezed had signed a publishing deal with the Dutch video game publisher Soedesco. The release date was originally expected to be in Q3, 2015, for PC. However, it was pushed back, and the game was released on Steam on January 29, 2016.

In December 2017, the game was released for PS4 and Xbox One. In January 2018, Defunct was added to the Windows Store. The PS4, Xbox and Windows versions were all ported by Soedesco's in-house porting studio Soedesco Studios.

On September 13, 2018, a port for the Nintendo Switch was released. The game was scheduled for release in Japan on May 14, 2020.

== Gameplay ==
The game is set on a post-human Earth, where the player plays as an old, broken racing robot. Players are barely able to move by themselves and are therefore required to use the environment for propulsion by utilizing the "Gravitize" ability to increase their gravitational pull. By turning this ability on when going downhill, the player will go faster; turning it off when going uphill will result in less of a decrease in speed.

There are speed boosts throughout the levels, either in the shape of little orbs which give the player a short burst of speed or as bottles or pools of "Enerjuice" which fill up a blue meter and can be used whenever the player chooses.

The player also has the ability to "Magnetize" which allows the player to stick to surfaces when going upside down or vertically.

== Reception ==
On Metacritic, the Nintendo Switch version of Defunct received a score of 57 out of 100, based on reviews from 5 critics, indicating "mixed or average reviews". A review from Digitally Downloaded gave the version a rating of 3.5 of 5 stars. PlayStation Country gave a score of 4 out of 10 points for the PlayStation 4 version.

=== Awards ===
Year	Event	Award	Result	Notes
2014	Gotland Game Conference	Best 2nd Year Game	Won	
2014	Swedish Game Awards	Best Execution in Art	Nominated	
2014	Swedish Game Awards	Best Execution in Audio	Nominated	
2014	Swedish Game Awards	Best Execution in Design	Nominated	
2014	Swedish Game Awards	Best Technical Execution	Nominated	
2014	Swedish Game Awards	Game of the Year	Won	
2014	Unity Awards	Best Student Project	Nominated	Finalist
