= CX-3 =

CX-3 or CX3 may refer to:

- Mazda CX-3, a subcompact crossover SUV model
- Korg CX-3, a clonewheel organ music instrument model
- Clariion CX3 series, a series SAN disk arrays

== See also ==
- 3CX
