= Clonewheel organ =

Electronic musical instrument

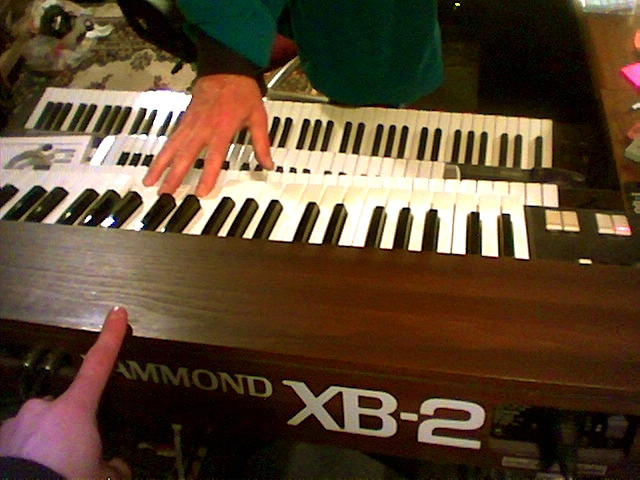
The Hammond XB-2 recreates the sound of the vintage electromechanical Hammond organs in a much lighter, smaller keyboard that uses electronic circuits to reproduce the sound of the spinning tonewheels.

A clonewheel organ is an electronic musical instrument that emulates (or "clones") the sound of the electromechanical tonewheel-based organs formerly manufactured by Hammond from the 1930s to the 1970s. Clonewheel organs generate sounds using solid-state circuitry or computer chips, rather than with heavy mechanical tonewheels, making clonewheel organs much lighter-weight and smaller than vintage Hammonds, and easier to transport to live performances and recording sessions.

The phrase "clonewheel" is a play on words in reference to how the original Hammond produces sound through "tonewheels". The first generation of clonewheel organs used synthesizer voices, which were not able to accurately reproduce the Hammond sound. In the 1990s and 2000s, clonewheel organs began using digitally-sampled real Hammond sounds or digital signal processing emulation techniques, which were much better able to capture the nuances of the vintage Hammond sound.

Clonewheel organs can be either electronic keyboard-based instruments such as the Korg CX-3 or the Roland VK-7; or keyboardless emulation devices, which include MIDI-compatible tone modules, such as the E-MU B-3 module and software-based "virtual synths" (such as the B4 by Native Instruments [discontinued]). To use keyboardless emulation devices, they need to be connected to a MIDI keyboard controller.

== History ==
=== Original electromechanical Hammond ===
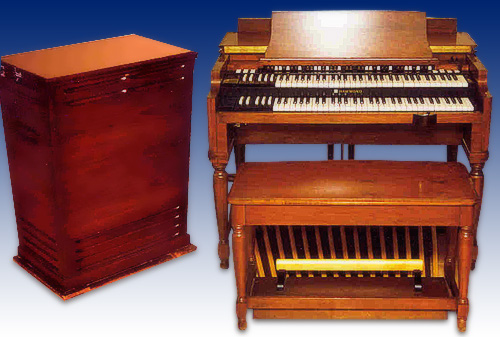
Typical tonewheel organ and rotating speaker (Hammond B3 & Leslie).

Drawbars

Tonewheel (right) rotates beneath electro-magnetic pickup (left)

The Hammond organ is an electromechanical organ that was designed and built by Laurens Hammond in 1934. While the Hammond organ was originally sold to churches as a lower-cost alternative to the pipe organ, it came to be used for jazz, blues, and then to a greater extent in rock music (in the 1960s and 1970s) and gospel music.

The original Hammond organ imitated the function of a pipe organ's ranks of pipes in multiple registers by using additive synthesis of waveforms from harmonic series to generate its sounds. The Hammond organ's individual waveforms were made by mechanical tonewheels which rotated beneath electromagnetic pickups. The component waveforms can be mixed in varying ratios by using drawbars mounted above the two keyboards. Hammond organs also have a harmonic percussion effect, in which the 2nd and 3rd harmonic tones can be added to the attack envelope of a note.

Hammond organs have a distinctive percussive key click, which is the attack transient that occurs when all nine key contacts close, causing an audible pop or click. Originally, key click was considered to be a design defect and Hammond worked to eliminate or at least reduce it by using equalization filters. However, some performers liked the percussive effect, and it has become part of the classic sound that modern imitators of the Hammond organ have tried to reproduce. The classic way of enhancing the sound of a Hammond organ is to use a rotating speaker known as a Leslie speaker or cabinet.

=== First "clones" ===
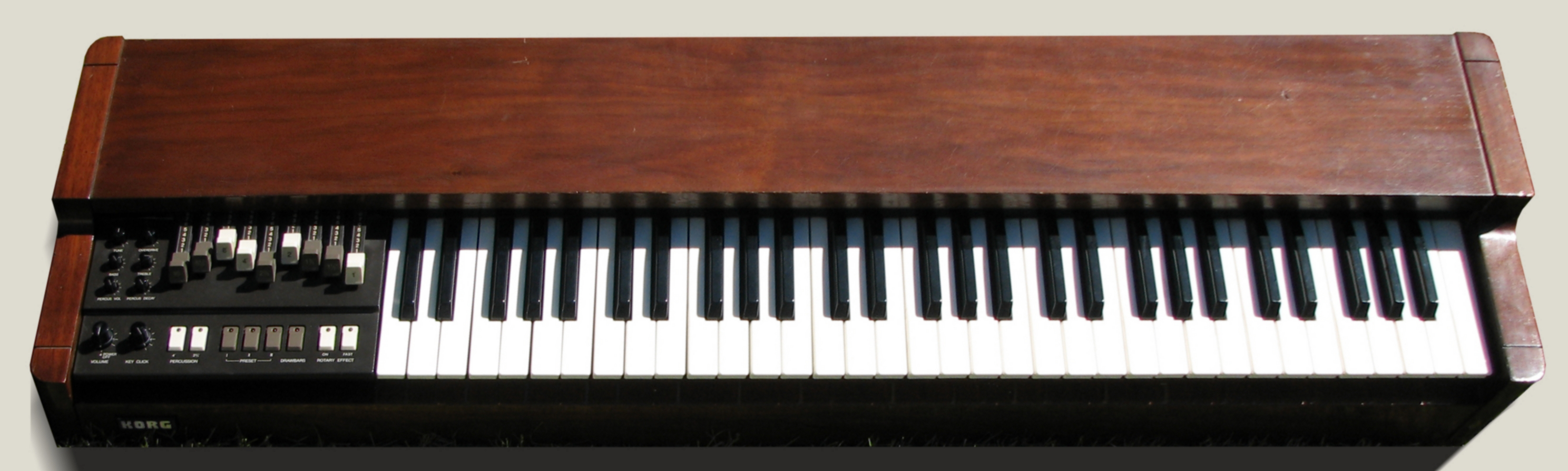
Korg CX-3 (1980) According to journalist Gordon Reid, it "came close to emulating the true depth and passion of a vintage Hammond."

Transporting the heavy Hammond organ, bass pedalboard (a B-3 organ, bench and pedalboard weighs 425 pounds/193 kg) and Leslie speaker cabinets to performance venues makes it cumbersome for artists to tour with a vintage electromechanical organ. As well, the Hammond, as with all vintage electromechanical instruments, faces the risk of technical problems with the tonewheels or electric motor, which may be difficult to resolve in a touring situation. As such, there was a strong demand amongst musicians for a way of recreating the Hammond sound in a more portable, reliable fashion.

Some early emulation devices from the 1970s were criticized for their unrealistic imitation of the Hammond sound, particularly in the way the upper harmonics were voiced, and in the simulation of the rotary Leslie speaker effect. Refinements to Hammond emulations eventually led to the development of relatively light electronic keyboard instruments such as the Korg CX-3 (1980), and the Roland VK-1 (1980), which produced fairly realistic re-creations of the Hammond tone. While these instruments were widely used to replace the bulky Hammonds for band tours and club dates, jazz and blues keyboardists still tended to use vintage Hammonds for recordings, because the first clonewheel organs could not reproduce the tonal nuances of the old wooden Hammonds.

=== 1990s and 2000s ===
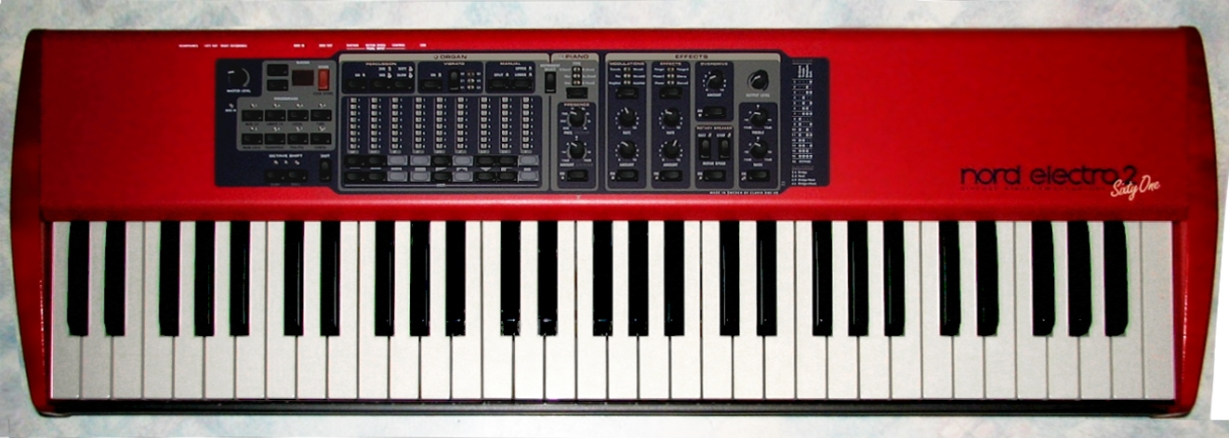
The NordElectro2 reproduces the sound of the Hammond organ and several other electromechanical instruments. Unlike most "clonewheel" instruments, the Nord does not have sliding drawbars. Instead, the player presses buttons which light up a row of LEDs to indicate the drawbar setting.

By the 1990s and 2000s digital signal processing and sampling technologies allowed for better imitation of the original Hammond sound, and a variety of electronic organs, emulator devices, and synthesizers provided an accurate reproduction of the Hammond tone, such as the Kurzweil K2600 and Clavia Nord Electro keyboard. Hammond Suzuki USA currently markets numerous home, church, and professional models that digitally reproduce the sound of vintage Hammond tonewheel organs. Some sophisticated emulation devices have algorithms that recreate many of the nuances of vintage Hammonds, such as the "crosstalk" or "leakage" between tonewheels, the sound of dirty key contacts, key click, a growling tube amplifier, and digital simulations of the rotating Leslie speaker cabinet.

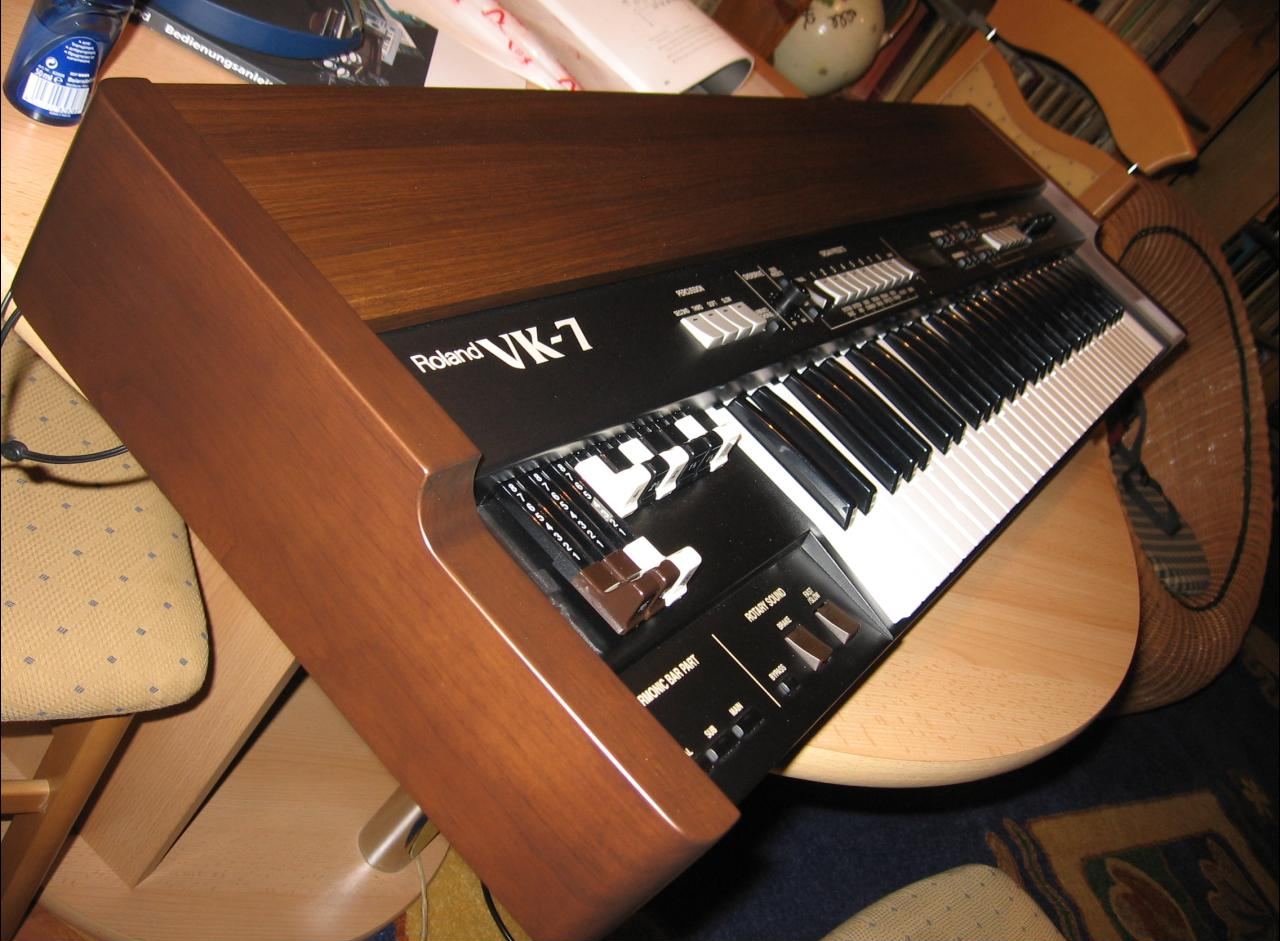
Roland VK-7 (1997) Even though the VK-7 recreates the Hammond sound using electronic circuits, the instrument gives a nod to the traditional heritage of the Hammond by using a wooden case.

Currently, there are numerous B-3 "clones" on the market, which range from full-size, dual keyboard behemoths with real Leslie cabinets from Hammond Suzuki (which can cost over $10,000 US), to inexpensive Casio WK series home keyboards that have a digitally recreated "tonewheel organ" function (which are available for less than $400 US). In between are numerous keyboard-based models from Hammond, Korg, Roland, Clavia (Nord Series), rack-mounted modules, and software-based "virtual synths" (such as the B4 by Native Instruments) which provide simulations of the B-3 sound. There is even a model by the Pari.E company which uses a modern version of the classic Hammond tonewheels, not a digital simulation.

The use of Hammond clones and the merits of using clones versus the vintage electromechanical Hammond is the subject of lively debate amongst musicians. The argument that digital simulations cannot recreate the complex interplay of variables that create the "Hammond sound" (tonewheel leakage, Leslie speaker rotation, etc.) is supported by a review of clones in Keyboard Magazine. The article, entitled "Clonewheel Heaven", reviewed electronic simulations of the traditional Hammond sound, and claimed that some aspects of the vintage electromechanical Hammonds' sound are not accurately reproduced by clones and emulation devices. Nevertheless, the increasing use of clonewheel organs on recordings by jazz and blues organ solo players is testimony to their sound and tone quality; it is also worth noting the wide variety of tonal variations that exist even among genuine vintage tonewheel Hammond organs. Owing to any number of causes — not least of which are the age of its components and the amount of use a tonewheel organ has had — variations in volume levels between tonewheels, varying levels of key click, and other tonal differences are more common than not.

Despite the widespread availability of relatively lower-cost, reliable digital "clones" and emulation devices, and the near-universal use of "clones" for band tours and club gigs, many jazz, blues and gospel keyboardists still have an interest in using vintage Hammond organs for studio recordings. Even if a clone is able to accurately reproduce the vintage electromechanical Hammond sound — several companies such as Clavia and Hammond Suzuki are making this claim — performers still enjoy the look, feel and, characteristics of the older vintage instruments.

== Format ==
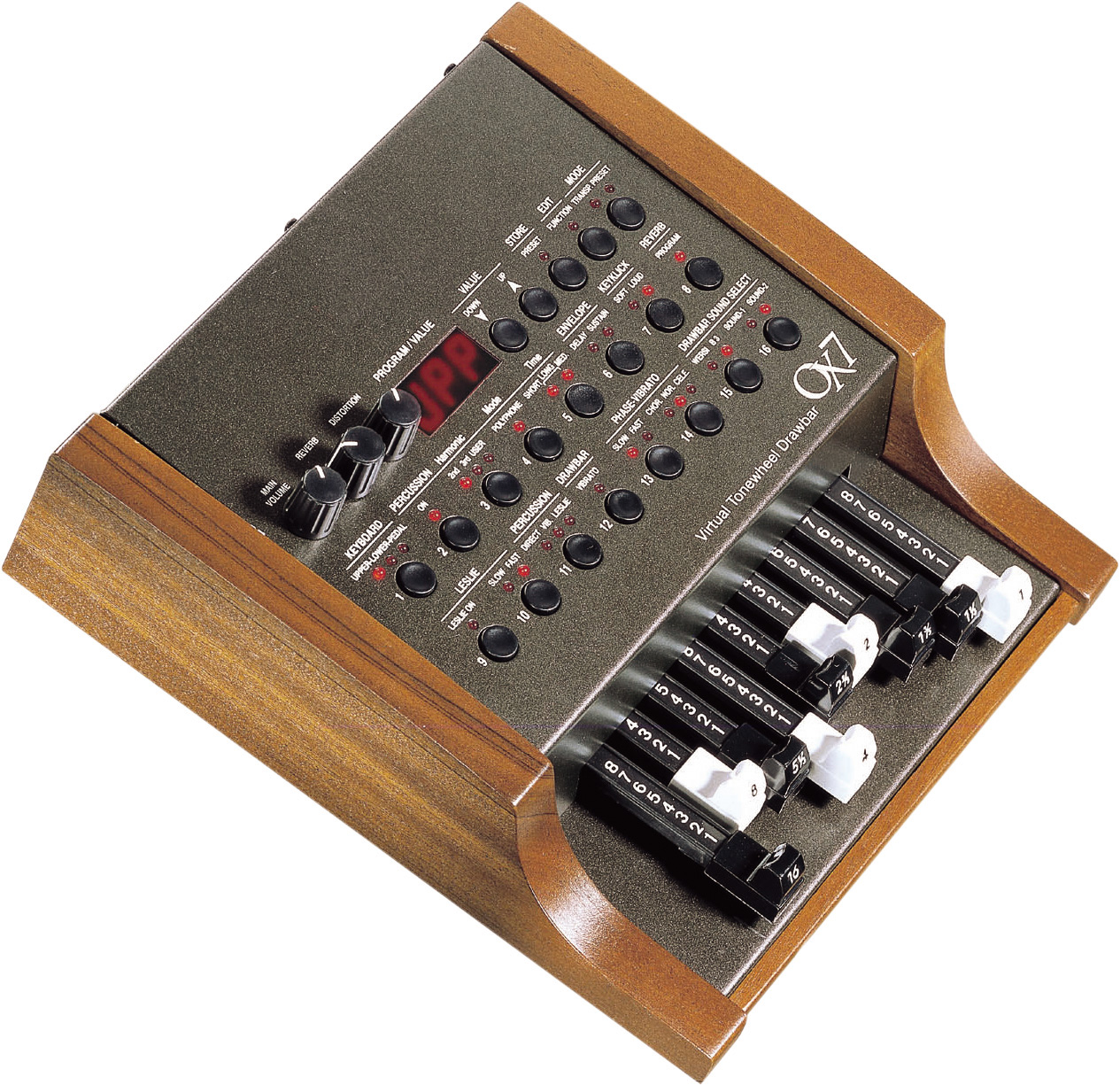
A WERSI OX7 organ sound module, which includes drawbars.

Clonewheel organs are available in several formats. The first is an integrated keyboard, in which the keyboard and the circuitry that provides the tonewheel emulation is in the same chassis. A second approach is a sound module, a tabletop device which only provides the organ sounds; it must be connected to a MIDI controller keyboard to be used. The tabletop units vary in sophistication. The least sophisticated units provide a selection of commonly used tonewheel sounds. More sophisticated units may have drawbars and a number of knobs and buttons for controlling the sound. The third format is as a virtual instrument, which requires a computer and monitor. The virtual instrument may depict the same types of controls that a real tonewheel organ would have on the monitor. The musician then uses a computer mouse or other input to change the settings.

== Instruments ==
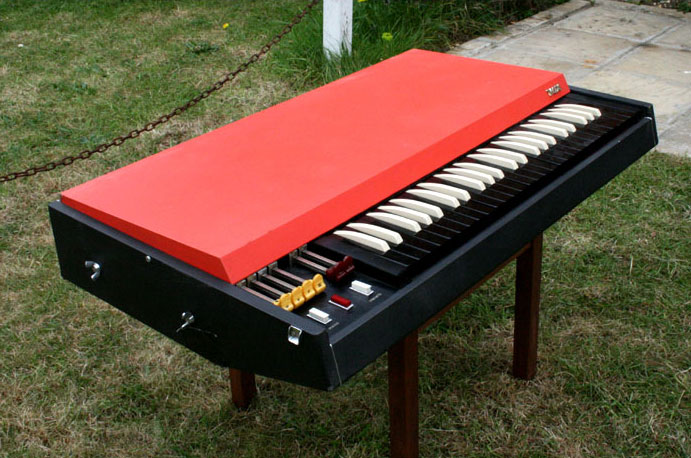
Vox Continental (1962–early 1970s)

=== Pre-clonewheel organs ===
Early drawbar organs inspired by Hammond

- Vox (designed by JMI, manufactured by JMI, Thomas, Eko and EME)
  Continental / Continental I (1962–c.1971), Continental II / Super Continental (1966/1967–c.1972), Riviera (1966–c.1972)
- Yamaha A-3 (1966), YC-10 (1969), YC-20 / YC-30 (1970), YC-25D / YC-45D (1972)
- Ace Tone TOP-1 (1968/1969), TOP-6 (c.1970)
- WLM Organ (1972–1984, made in Finland)

Hammond and related models

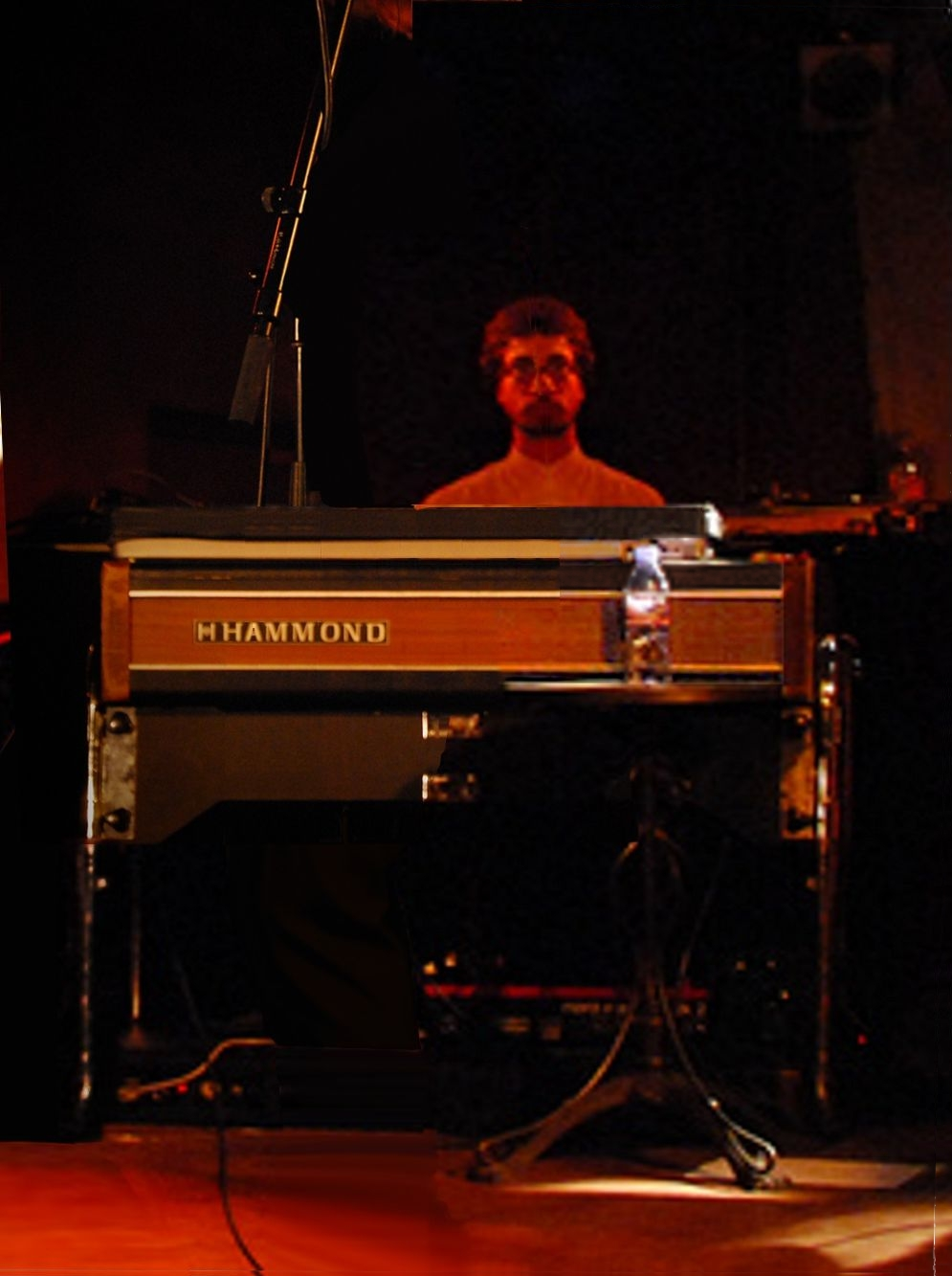
Hammond X5 (c.1974/1975)

- Ace Tone GT-5, GT-7 (1971, predecessor of Hammond/Sakata models)
- Hammond (manufactured by Sakata) X-5 (c.1974/1975), X-2 (1978), B-200
- Roland VK-9, VK-6, VK-09 (c.1978, spin off from Ace Tone)

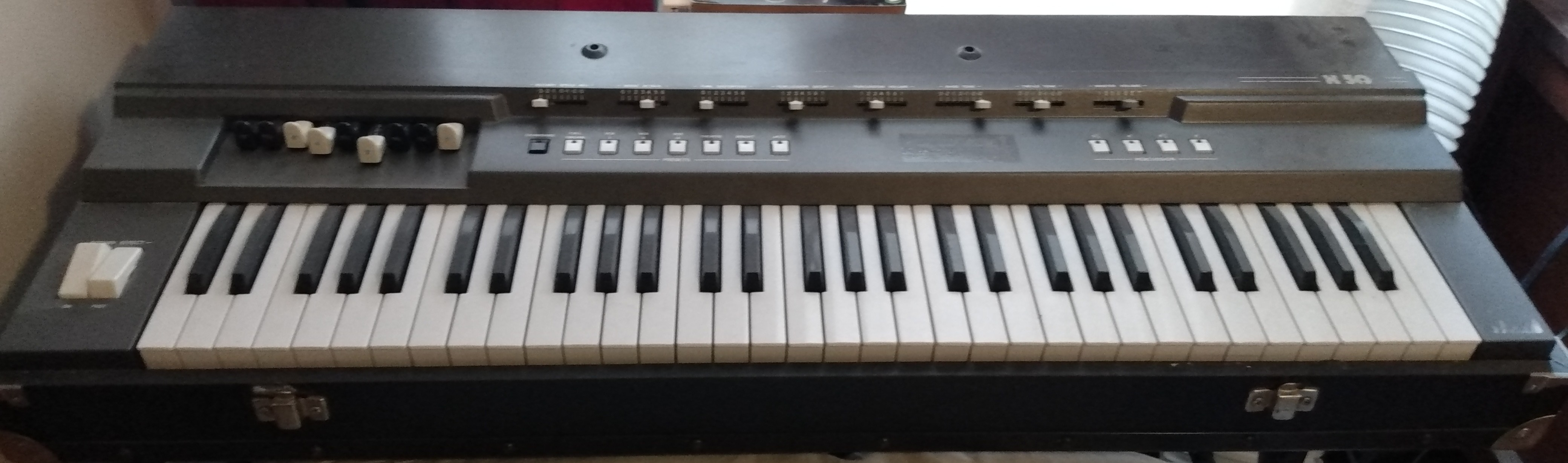
Elka X-50 clonewheel organ (1982)

Italian drawbar organs

- Farfisa Professional and Professional Duo (1969-1974), VIP series ('70s), Professional 88 and 110 (1977/78),
  and console models "Maharani" and "Pergamon"
- Crumar Haven, Organizer, Organizer2, Organizer T1, T2, Tokata, portable models from 1976 to 1980,
  and consoles 203, 204, 205, 2002, 2003
- Elka X50 (1982), X55, X605 and X705 (1977–1981)
- Solton Legend (1980s), B-1000 (c.1977, CRB Diamond 910M) / B 1000 s (c.1981)

etc..

=== Early clonewheel organs ===
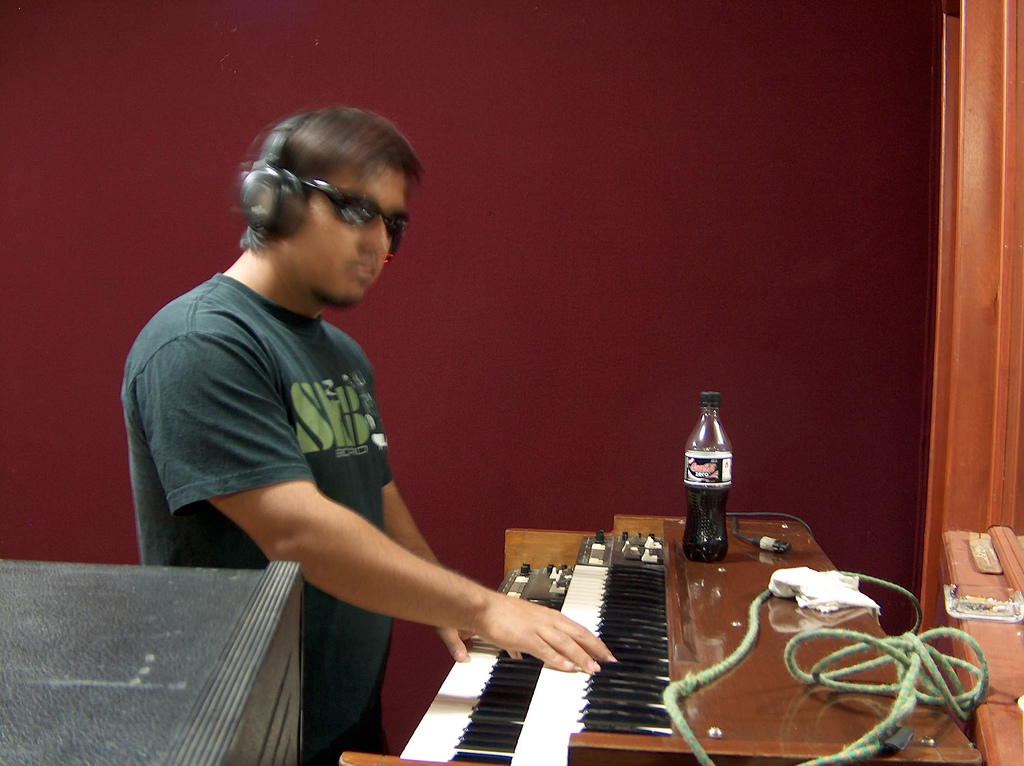
Korg BX-3 (1980)

- Hammond B-3000 (1976/1978, utilizing LSI for multiplexing, etc.)
- Korg CX-3, BX-3 (1980, analog)
- Roland VK-1 (1980, analog)
- Hammond (manufactured by Suzuki) Super-B (1986, a first all-digitally sampled organ from Hammond)

=== Major clonewheel organs ===
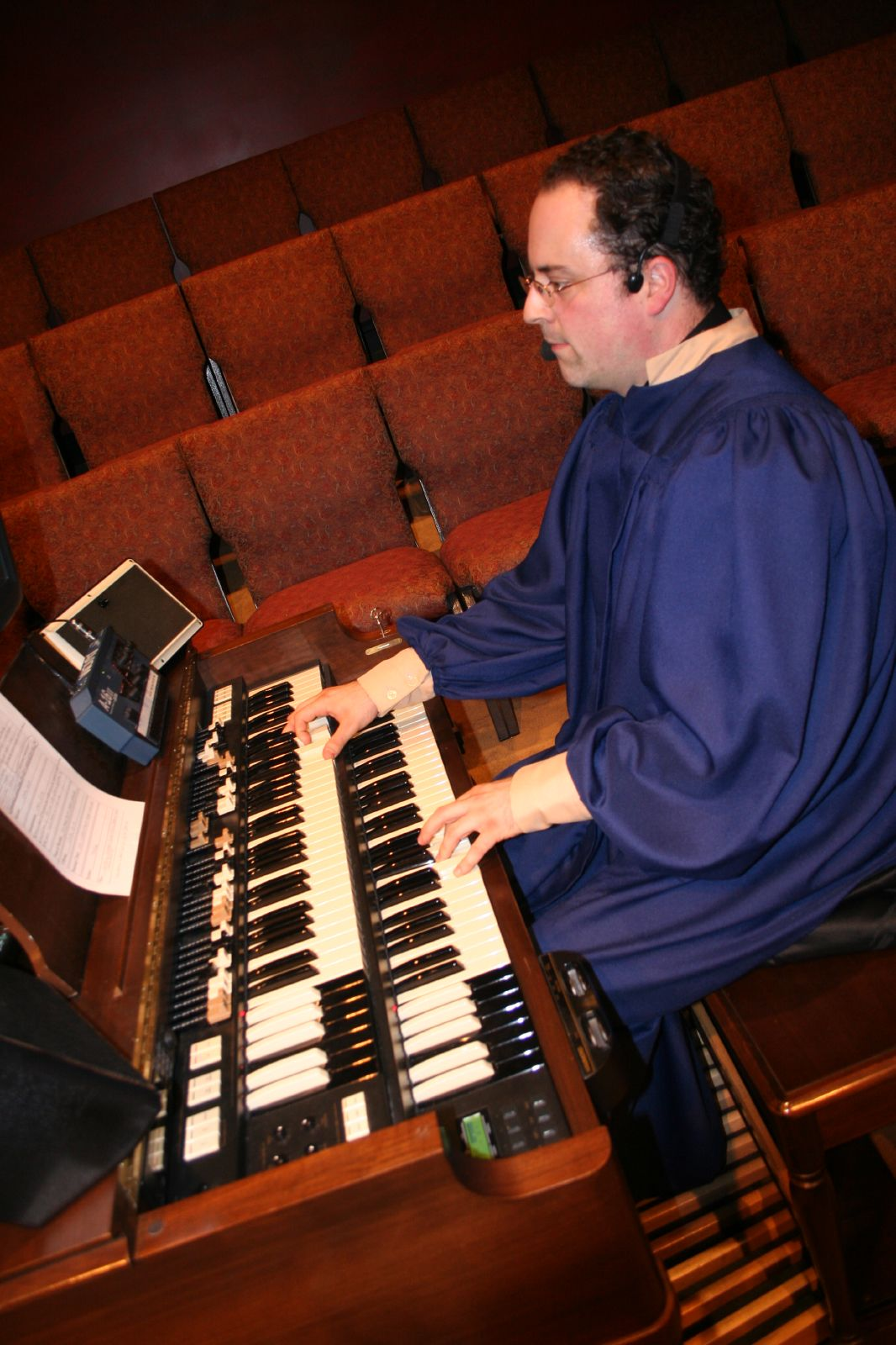
Hammond XB-3 (1994)

- Hammond Suzuki XB-1, XB-2 (1991), XB-5 (1993), XB-3 (1994), XC-3 (1995),
  XM-1 / XMc-1 (1997, module), XM-2 / XMc-2 (2006, module),
  XK-2 (1999), XK-3 / XLK-3 (2004), XK-1 (2006), XK-3c (2008), SK1 / SK2 (2011),
  and console models New B-3 (2002), New B-3 mk2, and XH-272 Elegante.
- Korg New CX-3 and New BX-3 (2000)

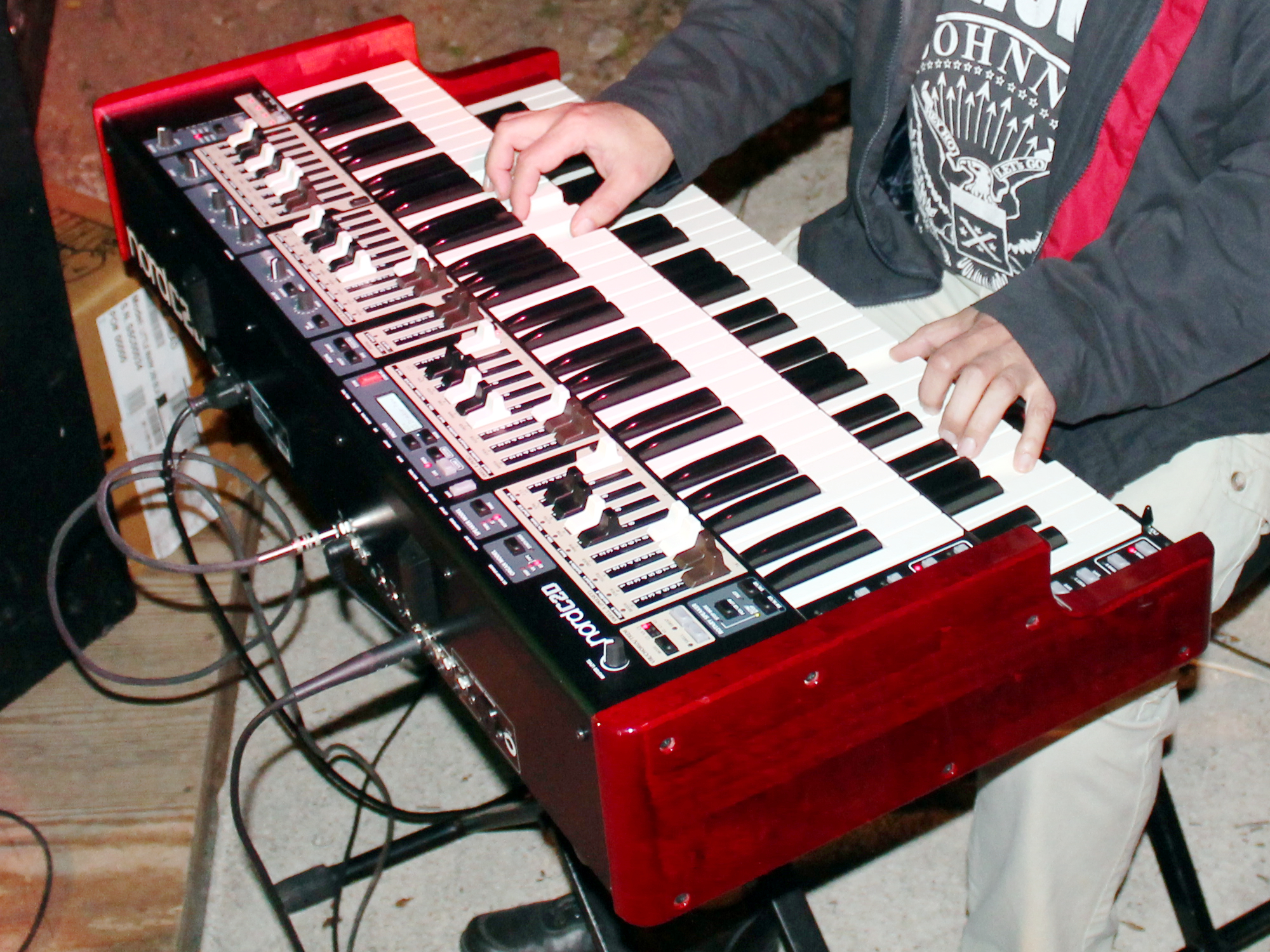
Clavia Nord C2D Combo Organ (2012–)

- Clavia Nord Electro Series (2001–), Nord Stage Series (2005–), Nord C1 / C2 / C2D Combo Organ (2007–), Nord Pedal Key 27 MIDI pedalboard
- Kurzweil K2500, K2600, PC2, PC2X, PC3, PC3X, PC3K, PC3A (KB3 mode, modeled tone wheel)
- Roland Rhodes VK-1000, Roland VK-7, VK-77, VK-8, VK-8m, VK-88, VR-760, VR-730 and VR-09 (V-Combo)

Others

- Böhm Emporio
- Casio CTK-691/900/7000/etc., WK-3000/3200/3300/3700/3800/etc. – providing digital drawbar organ function.
- Creamware B4000 (Tonewheel synthesizer)
- Crumar Mojo, Mojo 61, Mojo Classic
- Diversi Musical Instruments DV-Solo, DV-Duo, DV-Duo Plus
- Ferrofish B4000+
- E-MU B-3 module

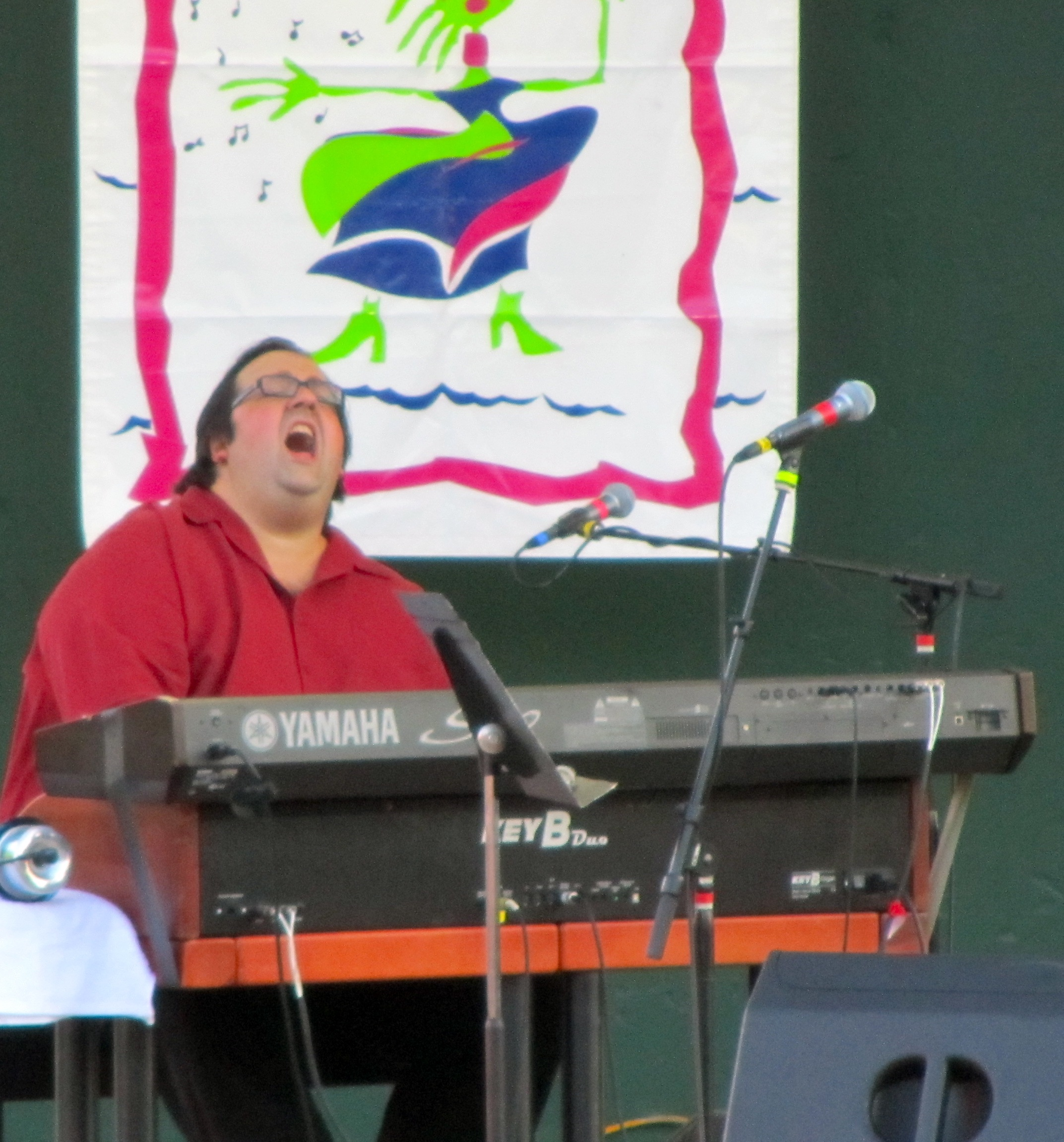
KeyB Duo

- KeyB/DLQ www.keyborgan.com KeyB Duo, KeyB Solo, KeyB Expander
- Oberheim OB-3, OB-3^{2} ([Oh-Bee-Three-Squared], module) and OB-5
- Roland Atelier AT-900, AT-900c, AT-800
- Studiologic Numa Organ
- Tokai TX-5
- Vermona Formation 1, 2, 3 and 3M
- Viscount DB-3, DB-5, Legend, Live, Solo,
- Voce microB-II V3, V5, V5+ and Key5
- Wersi Louvre, Scala, Verona, Giga Piano – a German company.
- Yamaha Reface YC (2015)
- KeyboardPartner HX3 (Hardware-based physical model) – www.keyboardpartner.com

Software
There are also software emulations available:

- GSi VB3 (shareware, VST plugin) (Note: As of 2010s, the product line of Genuine Soundware and Instruments (GSi; founded by Guido Scognamiglio) is distributed by V.M. Connection di Andrea Agnoletto (V.M. Connection; Quarto d'Altino, Italy): "About". GSi: Genuine Soundware and Instruments.)
- Linplug Organ 3 (previously known as daOrgan)
- setBfree (open source, standalone or plugin)
- Native Instruments B4, B4 II

Controllers

- Hamichord M-C3 (powered by GSi VB3 Hamichord edition II)
  Hamichord had been distributed (or produced) by BG's Musical Instruments (BGMI), (Note: The origin of PARI.E, the Pari organ was a tonewheel organ produced by Anton Parie in Belgium in the early 1960s, then the production of XT0 model was moved to Italy by Alfredo Gioielli around 1969, according to the HammondWiki: Jeff Dairiki (Geoffrey T. Dairiki). "Pari Organs". HammondWiki (dairiki.org). "The generator of Pari organs was created by Anton Parie, who started production of an electromagnetic organ in Belgium in the early '60s. Around 1969, production of XT0 model was moved to Italy by Alfredo Gioielli ...", "In 2005 Pari factory re-opened with the name of "PARI.E" the means "pari-electromagnetic" starting the production of a new organ, ... In the latter part of 2006, Pari started production of a new two-manual organ, the new K-61 (and a portable version, the K-61P)."; For details of old Pari organ, see: Henning Højen. "The Pari XT0 and Attack Organs". Hammond-Leslie.info.) then its successor model under Crumar brand has been introduced as following:
  - Crumar MOJO (powered by GSi VB3 version II) (Note: In the late 2000s, Crumar brand have been acquired and revived by BG's Musical Instruments (BGMI; Castelfidardo, Italy) / V.M. Connection di Andrea Agnoletto (V.M. Connection; Quarto d'Altino, Italy), and as of 2010s, the former BGMI's product line have been dealt by V.M. Connection.)

=== Electromagnetic tonewheel organs ===
- PARI.E K-61 (2006–c.2010s) – an Italian-made B-3 clone which uses an actual electromagnetic tonewheel generator, albeit of modern plastic construction. Also Leslie-clones were made.

== See also ==
- Hammond organ
- Organ trio
