= Programmer art =

Temporary or placeholder art

An example of what programmer art might look like in a video game. The programmer art (left) will often be quite low-quality until it is replaced with a real sprite (right).

In video game development and overall software development, programmer art refers to assets created by programmers.

Programmer art is made when there is an immediate need for an asset that does not yet exist. When this happens, a programmer will often use or create a placeholder, meant to be replaced at a later time before the project is published.

The term programmer art can encompass any art created by programmers. These assets can serve various purposes, such as quick testing of features, behind-the-scenes reasons, or even being intended for end-user display. The focus invested in an asset depends on its context and whether it will be replaced or not, so the asset is often more tailored to the game as a whole although programmer art is prevalently used a placeholder graphic, meant to be replaced.

It is a recurring trope for programmers, who are often believed to be logical-minded, to have little experience with or interest in creating art. It is somewhat seen as a contrast, leading to the creation of the term.

The player sprite in the 2008 indie game You Have to Burn the Rope

In indie games, programmer art is often the norm as small-time developers rarely have dedicated artists or budgets for professionally made assets. It can also be a deliberate choice as some end-users prefer it for its authenticity. Developer Kian Bashiri said of his 2008 game You Have to Burn the Rope that:

The graphics are just graphics, I didn't put any kind of meaning in the graphical design. The reason things look like they do is because 1) I thought it would fit with the retro style and 2) that I'm not a graphics-guy. Both the player avatar and the boss had more elaborate designs that I had to simplify a lot when it came to animating. That's why the boss is a square and the player a circle with a hat to vaguely disguise it.

Common forms of programmer art include stick figure sprites in side-scrolling games, fuchsia textures in games using 3D models, and grid textures for level geometry. Games with a "top-down" perspective tend to use alphanumeric characters and simple 2D graphics to represent characters and landscape elements.
