= Puzzlegeddon =

2008 video game

- Developer: Pieces Interactive
- Publishers: Tecmo (XBLA, PSN)
- Platforms: PC, Xbox Live Arcade, PlayStation Network
- Release: November 27, 2008 (Win); December 16, 2009 (XBLA); December 17, 2009 (PSN)
- Genres: Puzzle, Strategy
- Modes: Single-player, multiplayer

Puzzlegeddon is a puzzle/strategy video game, made by Swedish developer Pieces Interactive. It was released for Microsoft Windows on November 27, 2008, for Xbox Live Arcade on December 16, 2009, and for PlayStation Network on December 17, 2009.

== Gameplay ==
In the game, users play on a puzzle board made up of 6 × 6 blocks. The points, or resources, accumulated on the puzzle board is then used to purchase abilities which are used to attack and defend against opponents spread out over a globe.

The main game screen is centered on a view of a globe that is located in one of various galaxies. In the center of this globe the puzzle board is located and along the horizon of the globe each player is located. All interaction with the game is done by using the mouse to click on the different elements appearing on the globe.

The gameplay is based around matches between up to 6 players or computer-controlled players. The game supports multiplayer matches over the Internet or over LAN.

== History ==
Participating with an early version of the game, Puzzlegeddon won "Best PC Game" during the 2007 Swedish Game Awards.

== Reception ==
Go Fanboy gave the game 8 out of 10. They commented that the game was easily worth the low price despite some minor flaws.

== See also ==
- Puzzle Quest
- Chuzzle
