= Fret Nice =

2010 video game

- Developer: Pieces Interactive AB
- Publisher: Tecmo
- Platforms: Xbox 360 (XBLA); PlayStation 3 (PlayStation Network)
- Release: February 4, 2010 (Xbox 360); February 24, 2010 (PS3)
- Genres: Platform game Music video game
- Modes: Single-player, multiplayer

Fret Nice is a platform game developed by Pieces Interactive AB and published by Tecmo. The game was released on Xbox Live Arcade on February 4, 2010, and PlayStation Network on February 24, 2010. The game was designed to use a guitar controller, but can also be played using a normal gamepad. Players control the "Vibrant Chords", a rock band duo, as they traverse side-scrolling stages while avoiding enemies and hazards. The player can defeat enemies by strumming notes that correspond with their visual appearance, and they progress through the game by earning medals through meeting thresholds in the game.

Reviewers criticized the guitar controller control scheme, noting that the way different actions were mapped to it generally made the game difficult to play. With a standard controller, most critics felt that it was a mostly standard platform game experience that did not differentiate itself from other similar offerings.

== Gameplay ==
Fret Nice is a side-scrolling platform game where the player controls the "Vibrant Chords", a rock band duo, either in single-player or in co-op, and moves from left to right to reach the end of the level. The character uses a guitar to defeat enemies by strumming the instrument in the air. Monsters in the game have five different faces, which are visual cues to show which note must be played to defeat them. The player can achieve a combo by strumming notes together while undergoing a single leap and defeating multiple enemies. At the end of each level, the player jumps onto a helicopter and can then shoot bells to create a melody. Players earn medals in the game by defeating monsters with combos and earning a high enough score, finishing levels at particular speeds, and clearing as many monsters as possible. These medals can then be used to open up further levels in the game. The game contains a total of 12 levels, each individual one having 10 medals that can be earned through gameplay.

The game can be controlled using either a guitar controller or a standard controller. When playing with a guitar, the player must swing the neck of the guitar upwards to jump, and uses the green and yellow buttons on a guitar controller to move left and right. They must also use the other face buttons on the stem to target monsters. Some actions are assigned to the same inputs on the guitar controller: strumming the controller on the ground makes the player run, while strumming in the air makes the player freeze in place. Players can also use a standard controller, with the strumming controls mapped to the trigger and face buttons.

== Development ==
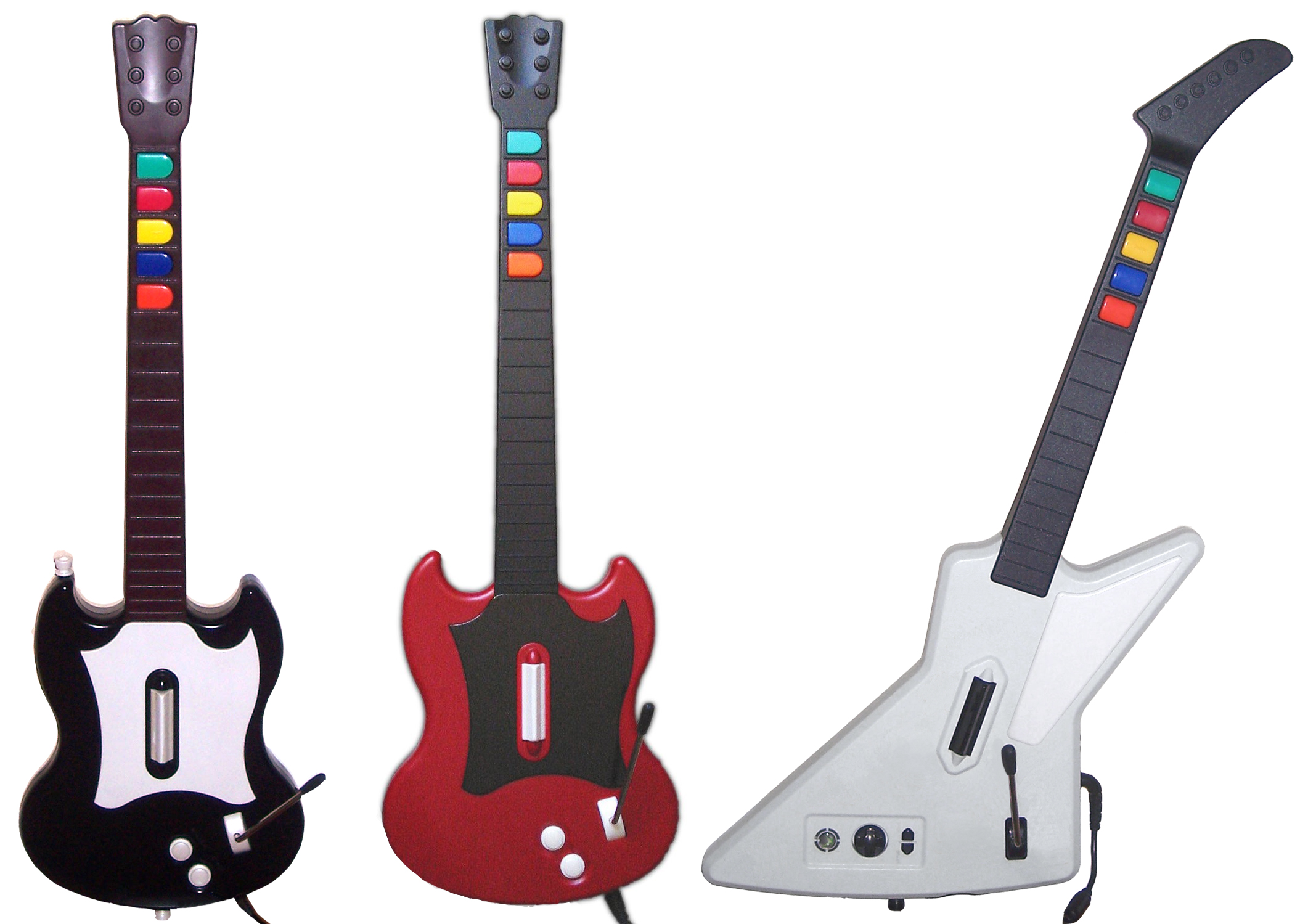
Brüggemann was inspired to make a game that used guitar controllers, like these pictured from the Guitar Hero series, by his playthroughs of Donkey Kong Jungle Beat.

Fret Nice was created by Swedish video game developer Mårten Brüggemann as his college thesis at the University of Skövde. Brüggemann was inspired by Donkey Kong Jungle Beat to create a game that used a guitar controller to control characters in a platform game; Brüggemann intentionally made Fret Nice play differently from Jungle Beat to differentiate it. Brüggemann noted that the guitar controller had a large influence on the overall game design as well. Because the guitar controller was difficult to use for controlling the game, Brüggemann decided to have your momentum carry you forward, inspired by games like Sonic the Hedgehog. Brüggemann worked with a schoolmate, Emil Burner, who created the artwork for the game. Brüggemann used Multimedia Fusion 2 because he "isn't good at programming" and thought it would do enough for what he wanted out of Fret Nice. The version of the game that was submitted to the 2008 Independent Games Festival took 6 months to make: the first half went to creating the core game mechanics, while the second half went to designing each level in tandem with Burner.

== Reception ==
Reviewers roundly criticized the implementation of the guitar controller in the title. IGN's Daemon Hatfield said that the need to swing the neck of the guitar controller up to jump "becomes old fast." Eurogamer's Keza MacDonald felt that the guitar controller's poor responsiveness "made me really appreciate how essential a control system is." GameSpot's Tom McShea said that it was worth trying out the game with the guitar controls "if for no other reason than to gain a new appreciation for a traditional controller." 1Up's Cole Jones said that the jump mechanic that requires the player to raise their guitar stem makes the control scheme feel "immediately broken." Despite the criticism of the control scheme from reviewers, however, the developers received the "Best Innovation" prize from the Swedish Game Awards in 2007 for their use of the guitar controller.

Most reviews also highlighted that with a normal controller, the game was still lacking. McShea noted that the game had a repetitive mission design that had "mushy" controls, even when playing with a standard controller option. MacDonald criticized the medals setup as "add[ing] considerably to the frustration." Hatfield said that with a normal controller, Fret Nice is just a "run-of-the-mill game" that was not worth a purchase. Jones, with an overall positive review, disagreed and compared the game favorably to LocoRoco, and said that Fret Nice is "a quirky platformer with an awesome aesthetic, a humorous story, and a ton of collectibles" as long as the player uses the standard control scheme.
