= Bloodline Champions =

2011 video game

- Bloodline Champions logo
- Developer: Stunlock Studios
- Publisher: Funcom
- Platform: Microsoft Windows
- Release: January 13, 2011
- Genre: Action
- Mode: Multiplayer

Bloodline Champions is a free-to-play action game developed by the Swedish company Stunlock Studios, with strong resemblances to the multiplayer online battle arena genre. Bloodline Champions won both "Game of the Year" and "Winner XNA" in the Swedish Game Awards 2009. The game officially launched in the United States on January 13, 2011. The spiritual successor to the game, Battlerite, created by the same developer Stunlock Studios, was released as a free-to-play game on November 7, 2017.

The players in this game are split up into two teams (Warm and Cold) with up to five players per team. The objective is different depending on the game mode, ranging from team deathmatch and capture-the-flag to map point control.

== Gameplay ==
Gameplay is in teams, which are composed of characters ('bloodlines') typically spread across the range of archetypes available - melee attack, ranged attack, healer, and tank. The principal battle mode and the one with automatic matchmaking is a simple fight to the death ('Arena'), but alternate modes focusing on capturing territory ('Conquest') or a capture-the-flag format ('Capture the Artifact') are available. Team size for automatic matchmaking is 2v2, 3v3, or 5v5. Multiple maps exist for each game type with different barriers and shapes; like many real-time strategy games and other similar genres, these maps have fog of war obscuring the parts of the map not visible to characters on your team.

Each character has six normal abilities each with an ability-specific cooldown, two 'EX' abilities which upgrade one of the normal abilities and share their cooldowns, and a seventh/ninth 'ultimate' ability which must be charged up by successfully using the other abilities (by dealing damage, healing allies, or other ability-specific triggers). Global abilities shared by all characters allow for out of combat hit point replenishment, or resurrection of fallen allies, with a large wind-up time that can be interrupted by enemy attacks. In these respects, as in the general matchmaking format, Bloodline Champions strongly resembles the basic structure of multiplayer online battle arena games, many of which were being developed during the same period.

Unlike most visually-similar games with a top-down camera, controls in Bloodline Champions are similar to a first-person shooter, as the bloodline's movement is controlled using the W, A, S, and D keys. The primary two abilities are mapped to the left and right mouse buttons, and the rest of the abilities are used with the Q, E, R, F, and space keys. Almost all the abilities are aimed, where the direction of the ability is determined by the position of the cursor on the screen relative to the champion's position.

=== Bloodlines ===
Bloodline Champions has 27 characters split into 4 archetypes: tank, ranged damage, melee damage, and healer. Tanks are generally close-quarters fighters and specialize in defense as well as peeling; removing pressure from allies by putting equal pressure on enemies. Ranged damage characters have lower health and deal high damage from a safe distance. They generally have many ways to escape melee combat but are taken down quickly if outmaneuvered. These bloodlines generally deal the most damage but must be in close range and have slightly higher health than ranged damage bloodlines. They tend to have very limited ways to control fights aside from their high damage output. Healers, as the title implies, keep their allies alive through a mix of powerful control and healing abilities. They have the lowest health of all bloodlines and generally lack mobility options other characters enjoy.

=== In-game currencies ===
Bloodline Champions is Free-to-Play (F2P). Bloodlines rotate every day, so there are always four available Bloodlines, one of each archetype. Players earn Blood Coins and spend them on additional Bloodlines, titles, avatars and other visual perks. None of the purchasable items give an edge in gameplay since there are no weapons with higher damage, for example, but they create more variety and choices in gameplay and appearance. Players can also choose to buy Funcom Points by using real money. Funcom Points serve the same purpose as Blood Coins, but they are bought using real currency instead of earned through in-game accomplishments. All marketplace items cost significantly less Funcom Points than Blood Coins.

== Reception ==
Reception

Aggregate score
Aggregator	Score
Metacritic	79/100

Bloodline Champions received mainly favorable reviews from critics; on aggregate review website Metacritic the game attains an overall score of 79 out of 100.

Strategy Informer gave BLC a score of 85% in their review, while PC Gamer gave 75%. Servers are located in Europe and USA; at this time there are no servers in Australia, South America, Africa, or Asia, but there is no area restriction whatsoever, so players in these regions are also able to play.

At release Bloodline Champions announced their participation in DreamHack Summer a LAN tournament with BLC having a $10,000 US prize pool. This helped contribute to the games initial success as a competitive arena game. Since release BLC has had multiple cash prize tournaments hosted by DreamHack and GLHF.gg for a total of $11,600 prize money as of July 11, 2011.
