= Battlerite =

2017 multiplayer action video game

- Developer: Stunlock Studios
- Publisher: Stunlock Studios
- Engine: Unity
- Platforms: Microsoft Windows, Xbox One (canceled)
- Release: Windows; November 7, 2017; Xbox One; Canceled
- Genre: Team brawler
- Mode: Multiplayer

Battlerite is a free-to-play team-based action game based on multiplayer online battle arena (MOBA) gameplay developed and published by Stunlock Studios. The game is considered a spiritual successor to Bloodline Champions and is created by the same developers. An early access version of the game was released in September 2016, selling over 440,000 copies within three months, and was officially released on November 7, 2017.

In May 2018, the developers announced the development of a new free-to-play game mode based on the battle royale genre planned to be released in the summer of the same year. In August 2018, the developers announced that the game mode would no longer be free and instead would be released as a standalone game planned to be released by the end of September of the same year.

In July 2019, Stunlock Studios announced that active work on the title would stop. October of the same year saw the last content update; both Battlerite and Battlerite Royal were to stay in "maintenance mode" for the foreseeable future.

== Gameplay ==
Battlerite consists of two teams, with two or three players each, battling against each other. Before the game begins, each player chooses a unique playable character called a Champion with unique offensive, defensive, and movement abilities. Defeating every player on the enemy team wins the round for your team, and winning three rounds wins your team the game. Rounds have a timer of around two minutes, and when the timer runs out a Sudden Death boundary appears which gradually forces players into a small area in the center of the map. Games may be played on one of several maps, each favoring different strategies.

Unlike traditional MOBA games, the goal of the game is not to destroy towers or other base structures. Additionally, players do not kill neutral units to gain resources, and therefore players cannot buy items or other resources in the game to augment their character's stats or abilities. This leads to an action-focused gameplay with in short matches compared to the longer strategy-focused games common in the genre.

== Reception ==
Reception

Aggregate score
Aggregator	Score
Metacritic	85/100

Battlerite received mainly favorable reviews from critics; on aggregate review website Metacritic the game attains an overall score of 85 out of 100.

PC Gamer gave the game a score of 89%, praising the game's pace, free-to-play model, and simplicity compared to other games in its genre. Similarly, IGN's Ian Nowakowski gave Battlerite a score of 8.2/10. While criticizing the randomized progression rewards as "lackluster," Nowakowski concludes "Battlerite strikes true where it counts, and that’s in the arena. The teamfighting hits hard at the core of what makes competitive gaming so engaging hour after hour."

Battlerite quickly rose in popularity upon launch. Two weeks after the game launched on Steam's Early Access, Stunlock Studios claimed they had already amassed 200,000 players, despite the fact that at the time the game was pay-to-play. As of right now, Battlerite has a small player base. According to SteamCharts, in 2017 player count peaked in November with 44,850 players in that month; as of 2018 the average monthly peak has decreased to less than 4,000.

PC Gamer included Battlerite in its list of the best free games on the Steam platform.
