= B4 Organ II =

- B4 Organ v2.0.0.007
- Developer(s): Native Instruments
- Initial release: 2000; 25 years ago
- Stable release: 2 / November 18, 2005; 19 years ago
- Operating system: Windows, macOS
- Size: 50 MB
- Type: Software synthesizer
- Website: native-instruments.com#/en/products/producer/b4-ii/

Demo of the B4 Organ II

The B4 Organ II is a discontinued commercial, proprietary software synthesizer made by Native Instruments. The software runs as a stand-alone executable, or as a VST, DXi, or RTAS plugin in a Digital audio workstation. The software is an example of a "Clonewheel organ", an attempt at recreating the sound of a Hammond organ using software synthesis.

== Overview ==
The synthesizer is an emulator of the Hammond B3 organ, also including emulators of the Vox continental, Farfisa organ, and Harmonium. The software allows fully customisable MIDI controls. The virtual instrument features a Leslie speaker simulation (with variable settings for rotor speed, acceleration, etc.) on the Hammond model presets.

== Features ==
B4 II includes extensive options allowing the user to shape the sound of the instrument. Full organ drawbars for the upper, lower, and pedal manuals are available. Amplifier and cabinet simulation allow the user to further tweak the sound, recreating famous jazz and rock organs. Percussion, key click, drive, and vibrato are among the other features emulated.
