= Junebud =

Swedish video game company

- Type: Publicly traded Aktiebolag
- Industry: Video games
- Founded: 2008
- Headquarters: Malmö, Sweden
- Products: MilMo

Junebud AB (publ) was a Swedish video game company that was specialized in 3D mobile and browser games. The company's focus was console quality, highly accessible games available via web portals, social networks and mobile platforms. Initially self funded, Junebud raised its first round of private capital in the Spring of 2009.

Junebud's main product was MilMo, a casual 3D MMO with platform game and action-adventure game elements. The game has been widely noted for its use of 3D graphics that are more advanced than those normally found in social network games. MilMo is one of the first 3D games on the Brazilian social network Orkut, where it was first released in cooperation with the social games publisher Mentez.

According to their website, Junebud has had to file for bankruptcy on August 1, 2012. This was confirmed by Junebud CEO, Ola Holmdahl via his personal Twitter account.

== Games ==
- MilMo
- Tuff Tanks
