= Diversi =

Diversi Musical Products, lnc
- Type: Privately held company
- Industry: Electric organ sound modules
- Founded: 2003
- Founder: Tom Tuson, Dave Amels
- Headquarters: USA
- Area served: United States and Canada
- Products: Diversi Drawbar Organs, KeyboardPartner HX3 Products
- Divisions: DrawbarCity the Vintage Hammond Organ Service and Retail division
- Website: http://www.diversi.us

The first Diversi Organ Model DV Console Organ. Two 61 note keyboards, 25 pedals, and four sets of 9 drawbars, The VOCE V5 Sound Engine, produced the drawbar sound. The VOCE V5 was created by Dave Amels as it had unlimited polyphony and used Physical Modeling Synthesis which was ahead of any other sound engine, at that time, to produce a realistic cloning of the vintage Hammond Tonewheel organ such as the famous B3. The Diversi Model DV Duo console organ. The second generation of Diversi Organs. This organ used a PC based computer using Physical Modeling Synthesis created by using Beatrix which was created by Fredrik Kilander of Sweden. Diversi Organ Model DV-Solo Portable Organ. Single 61 Note Keyboard, two sets of 9 drawbars and two pedal drawers. Key board split and drawbar flip so that the upper set of drawbars and lower set of drawbars could be flipped/swapped from left to right, allowing Gospel Organist that use the left (lower drawers) as on a vintage Hammond could run base lines.

Diversi Musical Products, Inc was a manufacturer of electric organs. It specializes in making clones of the Hammond organ and became popular when jazz organists "Papa" John and Joey DeFrancesco "defected" from Hammond to using their organs instead.

== History ==
The company was formed by former Hammond-Suzuki Northeast Regional Sales Representative and Marketing Services Manager Tom Tuson, who had been impressed by a drawbar MIDI module manufactured by Voce, which used physical modelling instead of samples. He became friends with Voce's Dave Amels, and the two decided to collaborate on a project to create their own organ. They came up with the Diversi DV, which earned immediate critical acclaim for its accuracy. In an interview with Keyboard magazine, Don Bosco said the DV "feels to me exactly how a vintage Hammond would have when it was new."

The company received a major boost when Joey DeFrancesco, self-described as "the finest jazz organist on the planet", publicly announced he had "defected from Hammond" and was now actively endorsing Diversi and owning a stake in the business. His 2008 album Joey D! was recorded entirely on a Diversi, with sleeve note author Michael G Nastos declaring that "the instrument DeFrancesco plays acts and sounds like an organ, if possible with a richer, deeper tone, especially in the bass foot pedals.” His father, Papa John DeFrancesco also used the Diversi to record Big Shot.

Diversi Organ Model DV-Duo Portable Console Organ. Same specs as the DV-Duo Console.

Tom Tuson had made a specific point in interviews, that Diversi could offer a more affordable drawbar organ with a better sound engine alternative than Hammond Suzuki's both the current XB3 models and the New B3, while being at a lower price and including a built-in Rotary Speaker simulator. Though he once, like many organists, thought the Hammond and Leslie Speaker were inseparable, he felt the simulation on the Diversi is so good that "I don't care if I ever see another Leslie in my life".

Diversi sponsored the Bobby Jones Gospel on the B.E.T. Network and had provided equipment for the show since 2003. One of the reasons that the Diversi DV-Duo was used is the Rotary Speaker simulation was go that they did direct input from the organ to the sound board. The big advantage was having no wind noise that can be produced by the upper and lower rotors of a Leslie Speaker.

Joey and John DeFrancesco died in 2022 and 2024, respectively. Between 2019/ 2020 Diversi announced that it was no long selling products.
