= Indolin-2-one monooxygenase =

Class of enzymes

Identifiers
- EC no.: 1.14.14.157

Databases
- IntEnz: IntEnz view
- BRENDA: BRENDA entry
- ExPASy: NiceZyme view
- KEGG: KEGG entry
- MetaCyc: metabolic pathway
- PRIAM: profile
- PDB structures: RCSB PDB PDBe PDBsum
Search
- PMC: articles
- PubMed: articles
- NCBI: proteins

Indolin-2-one monooxygenase (EC 1.14.14.157, BX3 (gene), CYP71C2 (gene)) is an enzyme with systematic name indolin-2-one,NAD(P)H:oxygen oxidoreductase (3-hydroxylating). It catalyses the following chemical reaction:

oxindole
O_{2}
H_{2}O
3-hydroxyindolin-2-one

Indolin-2-one monooxygenase is a cytochrome P450 protein containing heme, isolated from Poaceae (grasses). It uses molecular oxygen for the oxidation and requires a partner cytochrome P450 reductase for functional expression. This uses nicotinamide adenine dinucleotide phosphate. It is involved in the biosynthesis of protective and allelopathic benzoxazinoids in some plants.
