= Korg CX-3 =

Clonewheel organ

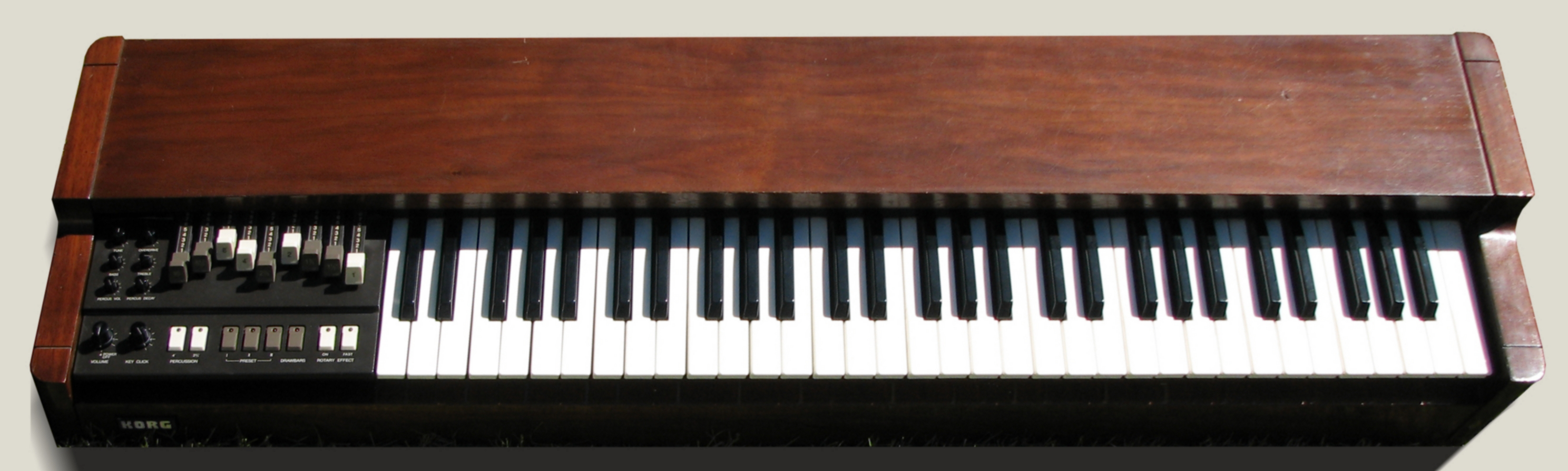
- Korg CX-3, 1980 model
- Manufacturer: Korg
- Dates: 1979 – 1991; 2001 – 2011
- Price: $1,340 (1979) $2,595 (2001)

Technical specifications
- Polyphony: Full
- Synthesis type: Additive
- Hardware: Siemens SM304 key encoder

Input/output
- Keyboard: 61 note manual (CX-3); 2 x 61 note manuals (BX-3)
- External control: drawbars, knobs for volume and overdrive, buttons for percussion effect and rotary speaker effect

The Korg CX-3 is an electronic clonewheel organ with drawbars that simulates the sound of an electromechanical Hammond organ and the Leslie speaker, a rotating speaker effect unit. The CX-3 was first introduced in 1979.

Two models of the CX-3 were produced: a 1979 analog version and a 2001 digital version. As well, a two-manual (two keyboard) version of the CX-3 was produced, the BX-3.

== History ==
There had been a market for a lightweight clone of the Hammond organ, due to the Hammond's heavy weight and large size, which made it hard to move to shows. In the 1970s, makers of combo organs attempted to emulate the Hammond sound, but many were poorly received, though the Italian Crumar organs could sound reasonable in a mix with a Leslie speaker, a rotating speaker cabinet.

=== 1979 model ===
The Korg CX-3 gave a convincing enough emulation of a tonewheel Hammond's sound to be used in professional live performances, particularly when played through a real Leslie speaker. An expanded version of the instrument, the BX-3, had two manuals.

The Korg CX-3 (single manual) and BX-3 (dual manual) were the first lightweight organs to produce a comparable sound to the original Hammond B-3. Sound on Sound's Gordon Reid said that the CX-3 "came close to emulating the true depth and passion of a vintage Hammond," particularly when connected to a Leslie speaker.

The 1979 Korg CX-3 has nine drawbars, a volume knob, an overdrive knob, two percussion buttons (4' and 2 2/3' percussive sound), percussion volume, percussion decay knob, key click knob, tone control knobs (bass and treble), tuning knob, three presets (jazz, octaves, full organ), rotary speaker emulator button (imitates the Leslie sound), slow-fast button for rotary speaker, effects send and return, rotary speaker control jack (slow-fast), high level output for a PA system, and low level output jack for plugging into a guitar amplifier.

The instrument struggled to compete with digital synthesizers in the 1980s, particularly with the popular Yamaha DX7, and CX-3 sales fell. Production eventually ceased due to the Siemens SM304 chip used in the instruments becoming obsolete. By the end of the 1990s, instruments were being sold second-hand for a similar amount as spinet Hammond organs such as the L100 or M100.

=== Korg CX-3 digital 2001 model ===
A digital remake of the Korg CX-3 was launched in 2001, has two sets of drawbars, a waterfall keyboard, expression and overdrive controls, and a built-in reverb unit and Leslie simulator. It also had a tube (valve) amplifier simulation. It weighs 37.5 lb (17 kg). It has a 20-character fluorescent display to provide information to the player about the presets and effects. It uses Korg's REMS (Resonant structure and Electronic circuit Modeling System) to provide sound modeling and emulation for the tonewheel sound.

Like a Hammond B-3, the Korg CX-3 has three vibrato settings and three chorus settings. It has two drawbar sets of nine drawbars per set, and offers a split keyboard mode. It also has MIDI In, Out and Thru jacks so it could be connected to sequencers or other MIDI instruments. It can save 128 programmable presets.

Korg implemented a range of MIDI capabilities. The CX-3 offers seven different MIDI channels, which are all adjusted globally. The upper and the lower parts of the split keyboard each have an individual RX and two TX channels. The first TX will send a note according to the waterfall keyboard, i.e. when the key is depressed by about 1mm, whereas the second TX will send the note when the key is completely pressed down. The global channel (e.g. for program change commands) is the same for RX and TX.

The 2001 model has some buttons and functions not present in the 1979 version. Among these are an edit button, a write/enter button, an exit button, eight program select buttons, check/advance buttons, and increment/decrement buttons. Many of the buttons have LED status lights. In addition, the 2001 model has a 1/4" expression pedal jack and two 1/4" assignable control jacks (switch pedals could be connected to the two assignable jacks to control various features, such as turning on the rotary speaker emulator or selecting programs). A feature not found on the 1979 CX-3 or on the vintage Hammond B-3 is the 2001 CX-3's EX mode, which enables the user to produce new and even unusual synthesized sounds using the tonewheel synthesis engine. The CX-3 does not have an 11-pin Leslie speaker jack, a feature found on vintage Hammond B-3's and on earlier clonewheel organs.

Besides the balance between the horn and the rotor the Leslie simulator offers many programmable details: slow speed, fast speed, up transition time, down transition time and stop transition time, and microphone spread and distance. All these are available for the horn as well as for the rotor and are individually saved for each preset.

The amplifier simulation provides two types or just a preamplifier. It has a three-band equalizer providing adjustable gain in the range +/-10dB for each band. All these settings are per preset.

The 2001 digital Korg CX-3 was retired in 2011 after the introduction of the Korg Kronos. The Kronos included a tonewheel modelling engine as one of nine sound-generating engines.

==== Korg BX-3 ====
The two-manual version of the Korg CX-3 is the BX-3. It has two keyboards stacked on top of each other in a staircase fashion, each with its own set of drawbars, enabling performers to have different sounds for the upper and lower manual. Sound on Sound reviewer Gordon Reid called the Korg BX-3 the "best Hammond C3/B3/A100 emulation I've heard" and he praised its "excellent editing system with a large, friendly screen", "first-class on-board treatments and effects", the 'EX' mode, which adds four drawbars to the vintage Hammond approach, its "excellent MIDI CC capabilities" and its playability and "gorgeous" appearance; at the same time, Reid criticized its bi-timbral set-up, which does not allow performers to "play two manuals plus pedals", there is no vintage-style 11 pin Leslie output and it is expensive.

The Korg BX-3 provides separate vibrato, chorus, and percussion controls for each manual, enabling the performer to have different tones for each manual. Unlike the CX-3, which did not come with an expression pedal, the BX-3 has an expression pedal, which enables the performer to adjust the volume while performing; the CX-3 expression pedal also has a spring-mounted feature which returns the pedal to a default position after the performer has depressed it to its maximum for a fortissimo effect.

The BX-3/CX-3 expression pedal is identical to the FC7 by Yamaha.

== Notable users ==
- Marillion's Mark Kelly used a CX-3 for live performances and recording in the early 1980s. Although he wanted a Hammond C-3 organ, it was impractical for touring.
- Manfred Mann was an early adopter of the CX-3, using it when touring with Manfred Mann's Earth Band since 1980.
- Paul Shaffer has used a CX-3 in various television and live appearances.
- Derek Sherinian used a CX-3 when touring with Dream Theater, and also contributed to development of the second version of the instrument.
- Adam Wakeman used a CX-3 when touring with Ozzy Osbourne.
- Isaiah "Ikey" Owens used a CX-3 when touring with The Mars Volta between 2002 - 2010.

Starting around 1980, Fela Kuti is known to have often used a CX-3 live on stage at home and on tour.
