= Voce =

Premium Mobile Virtual Network Operator (2005-2008)

- Industry: Telecommunications, Concierge Service
- Founded: 2005
- Defunct: February 1, 2008
- Fate: Defunct
- Products: Wireless

Voce (Italian for voice) was a premium Mobile Virtual Network Operator (MVNO) using the AT&T GSM network sold by Neiman-Marcus and created by Japanese company Faith Communications. During the month of January 2008, ownership was transferred to SunCal Midwest. The service launched November 2005 and subsequently shut down February 1, 2008 with no official announcement, which caught most customers and some company executives completely by surprise.

The MVNO targeted individuals who desired a mobile phone with unlimited calling, plus an included concierge service. The initiation fee was $500, with a recurring $200 monthly charge (excluding tax). Included was a free customized Voce handset with damage insurance, free trade-in replacements every twelve months, and free accessories, unlimited domestic calling and roaming, unlimited directory assistance, SMS, and WAP, personalized setup and training, and unlimited access to a concierge for travel assistance, technical support, and other services. The original plan was for a $1500 sign up fee and $500 monthly charge, but with new handsets every four months. Handsets available were the Motorola KRZR, Nokia E61i, Nokia N95, LG Prada, Nokia 8600 Luna, Sony Ericsson W880i.

Voce was available in Arizona, California, Florida, Nevada, New Jersey, and New York.

Controversy arose in January 2008, when many Voce clients were double billed on their last statements. Following this, on February 1, 2008, cell phone service was disconnected. Voce has never provided an official statement to its customers regarding the status of its network, but all company phone numbers are disconnected and Voce has now taken down their website. Following the elimination of cell phone service, many Voce customers complained to Neiman Marcus requesting refunds or store credit. Neiman Marcus did not issue any such credits, but referred existing customers to preferred vendors to replace their service. Most customers were referred to AT&T for cell phone service, and to Red Butler for concierge services.

Company executives have reported being fired via text message, or simply having their phones turned off, confirming that the company abruptly went out of business. RCR Wireless News reports that, the former COO, Roy Kosuge, discovered that he'd been fired when his phone line was disconnected, he told the Los Angeles Times.
