= Kian Bashiri =

Video game developer

- Born: 1987 (age 38–39)
- Education: Stockholm University
- Occupation: Video game developer
- Notable work: You Have to Burn the Rope

Kian Bashiri (born in 1987) is a Swedish video game developer and programmer, best known for the IGF Innovation Award-nominated metagame You Have To Burn The Rope released in 2008. He started making Flash games in 1999 and continued to play around with the software for many years before deciding he wanted to be a professional games developer. Bashiri attended Stockholm University and the School of Future Entertainment where he studied computer game development. Beyond You Have To Burn The Rope, he developed and released other games independently, such as Metro: Rules of Conduct (2008) and Swarm (2008), the latter which won him a Swedish Game Award for Best Mobile Game. After graduating, however, he joined the small Stockholm studio Might and Delight as Lead Game Programmer for the game Pid. As of 2021, he was working as the Lead Animation Programmer at Ubisoft Stockholm.
