= Rotary speaker =

Rotary speaker may refer to:

- Leslie speaker
- Rotary woofer
