= You Have to Burn the Rope =

2008 video game

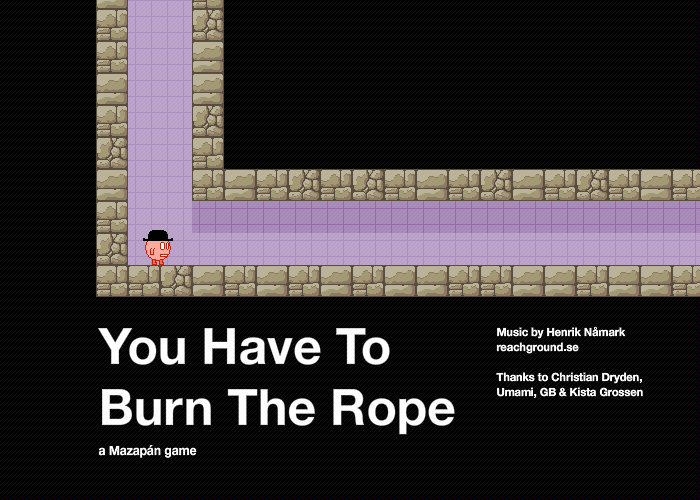
- Developer: Kian Bashiri
- Platform: Adobe Flash
- Release: April 2008
- Genre: Platform
- Mode: Single-player

You Have to Burn the Rope is a platform game for Adobe Flash developed by Swedish designer Kian Bashiri under the moniker "Mazapán". The game was a finalist for the Innovation Award at the 2009 Independent Games Festival. and received a considerable amount of "Internet buzz" for its humorous gameplay at the time of its release. You Have to Burn the Rope is a brief parody of excessive hand-holding in AAA video games, in which destroying the titular rope is the only way to win and the player is told that fact in advance.

== Gameplay ==
You Have to Burn the Rope is a platform game in which the player must guide a character through a comically short level in which the very simple winning conditions of the game are humorously summarized as text on the walls. At the end of the level, an enormous "Grinning Colossus" awaits the player, shooting him with lasers coming out of his eyes, though they don't kill the player, only temporarily incapacitate them. To beat the Colossus, the player must touch one of the torches on the wall and use it to burn the rope attaching a chandelier to the ceiling, dropping it on the Colossus' head. The character can throw axes which lower the Grinning Colossus' health bar. However, the health bar regenerates too fast for the player to drain it completely.

At the end, there is a short section of credits which includes the original song "Now You're A Hero", composed by Henrik Nåmark. The entirety of the game is often shorter than the credits song itself, which runs for 2:13. As of January 2023, the current speedrun world record is held by user Saradoc, with a completion time of 26s 466ms.

== Development ==
Kian Bashiri, the game's developer, had stated in interviews that he wanted the game's entire experience to be spoiled by the title. Nevertheless, Justin Davis of IGN noted that there were a surprising number of people who did not realize they had to burn the rope to win and complained that their axes did too little damage.

== Reception ==
You Have to Burn the Rope was a finalist for the Innovation Award at the 2009 Independent Games Festival.

Griffin McElroy of Joystiq sarcastically praised the game for its "stunning character design, addictive gameplay, and breathtaking soundtrack", calling the game "a smörgåsbord of top-notch writing, programming, and design".

Dan Hopper of Best Week Ever said "You Have To Burn The Rope Is By Far The Greatest Online Game I Have Ever Played".

== Legacy ==
A few unrelated games have alluded to the game's title. The 2010 action game Red Steel 2 has a mandatory quest that parodies it, titled "You Have to Cut the Rope". Another indie game is entitled Grinning Cobossus and consists of a single boss fight against an opponent much like You Have to Burn the Rope's, with considerably more gameplay. The Grinning Colossus appears as the first boss in the 2012 flash game Death VS Monstars 2.
