= Audioengine =

Audioengine may refer to:

- Audioengine (company), manufacturer of home speakers and sound systems
- Yamaha AudioEngine, line of sound chips produced by Yamaha
