= Audioengine (company) =

American audio equipment manufacturer

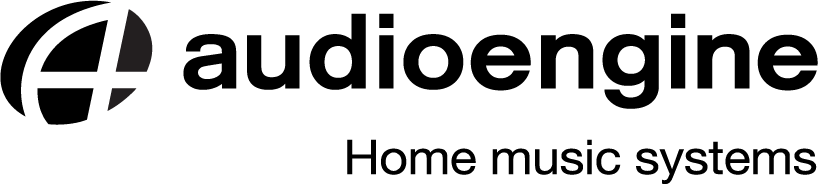
- Company type: Private
- Industry: Audio
- Founded: 2005; 21 years ago
- Headquarters: Sherman, Texas, U.S.
- Key people: Nate Rodriguez (CEO)
- Products: loudspeakers
- Website: www.audioengine.com

Audioengine is a Texas-based, privately owned audio company founded in 2005. The company specializes in home music systems and other audio components designed for homes, offices, and desktops. Audioengine is known for integrating both analog wired inputs as well as digital connections in its products with connectivity via RCA, 3.5mm AUX, Optical, USB and Hi-Res Bluetooth.

== History ==
Founded in 2005, Audioengine produces home audio systems such as the A5, its first product described as a powered speaker system for desktop and home use. Following the A5, Audioengine expanded its product line with the A2, a smaller desktop speaker system that featured wood speaker cabinets and detailed audio output. The A2 was later updated to the A2+, integrating Bluetooth technology, enabling wireless streaming from various devices.

Over the years, Audioengine introduced other products such as those in the HD Series, which includes high-fidelity powered speakers suitable for a variety of listening environments. The company also launched the B2, a Bluetooth-enabled all-in-one portable speaker designed to bring high-fidelity audio to small and medium-sized rooms.

== Products ==
New York magazine's "The Strategist" said the A2+ was the "Best Overall Desktop Speaker" of 2024 TechRadar also reviewed it positively.

Wired has reviewed the B2 positively as a competitor in the high-end Bluetooth market due to its design and high quality wireless streaming. Audioengine also expanded its offerings with digital-to-analog converters (DACs) and wireless music receivers, such as the B1 Bluetooth Music Receiver and the D1 DAC and headphone amplifier, both of which have received favorable reviews.

According to PCMag, the B1 Bluetooth Music Receiver is "a simple way to stream high-quality wireless audio through your home."
