= Yamaha TMX =

Drum trigger module

- Manufacturer: Yamaha
- Dates: 1993

Technical specifications
- Polyphony: 16 voices
- Synthesis type: PCM rompler
- Storage memory: 32 performances

Input/output

The Yamaha TMX is a drum trigger module that uses PCM samples. It was made in Japan in 1993. It is a 1U rackmountable unit that has a 16 × 2 LCD.

== Features ==
The unit has 12 analogue triggers for external drum pads to trigger or play the device.

== Hardware ==
The unit features a H8/532 16 bit digital-to-analog converter, MIDI interface, main signal and aux analogue out.
