= YTR-2320 =

The Yamaha YTR-2320 Trumpet was a student level B-flat trumpet, manufactured by Yamaha from 1984 until 1997. It was replaced with the YTR-2335 and then the YTR-2330. It was lightweight, made with yellow brass.
