= List of ZX Spectrum clones =

The following is a list of clones of Sinclair Research's ZX Spectrum home computer. This list includes both official clones (from Timex Corporation) and many unofficial clones, most of which were produced in Eastern Bloc countries. The list does not include computers which require additional hardware or software to become ZX-compatible. Many software emulators can fully or partially emulate some clones as well.

== Official ==
The only official clones of the Spectrum were made by Timex. There were three models developed, only two of which were released:

=== Timex Sinclair 2068 ===
The Timex Sinclair 2068 or T/S 2068 (also known as TC 2068 or UK 2086) was a significantly more sophisticated machine than the original Spectrum. The most notable changes were the addition of a cartridge port, an AY-3-8912 sound chip, and an improved ULA giving access to better graphics modes. The T/S 2068 was produced for consumers in the United States, while very similar machines were marketed in Portugal and Poland as the Timex Computer 2068 (TC 2068) and Unipolbrit Komputer 2086 (UK 2086) respectively. A small number of TC 2068s were also sold in Poland.

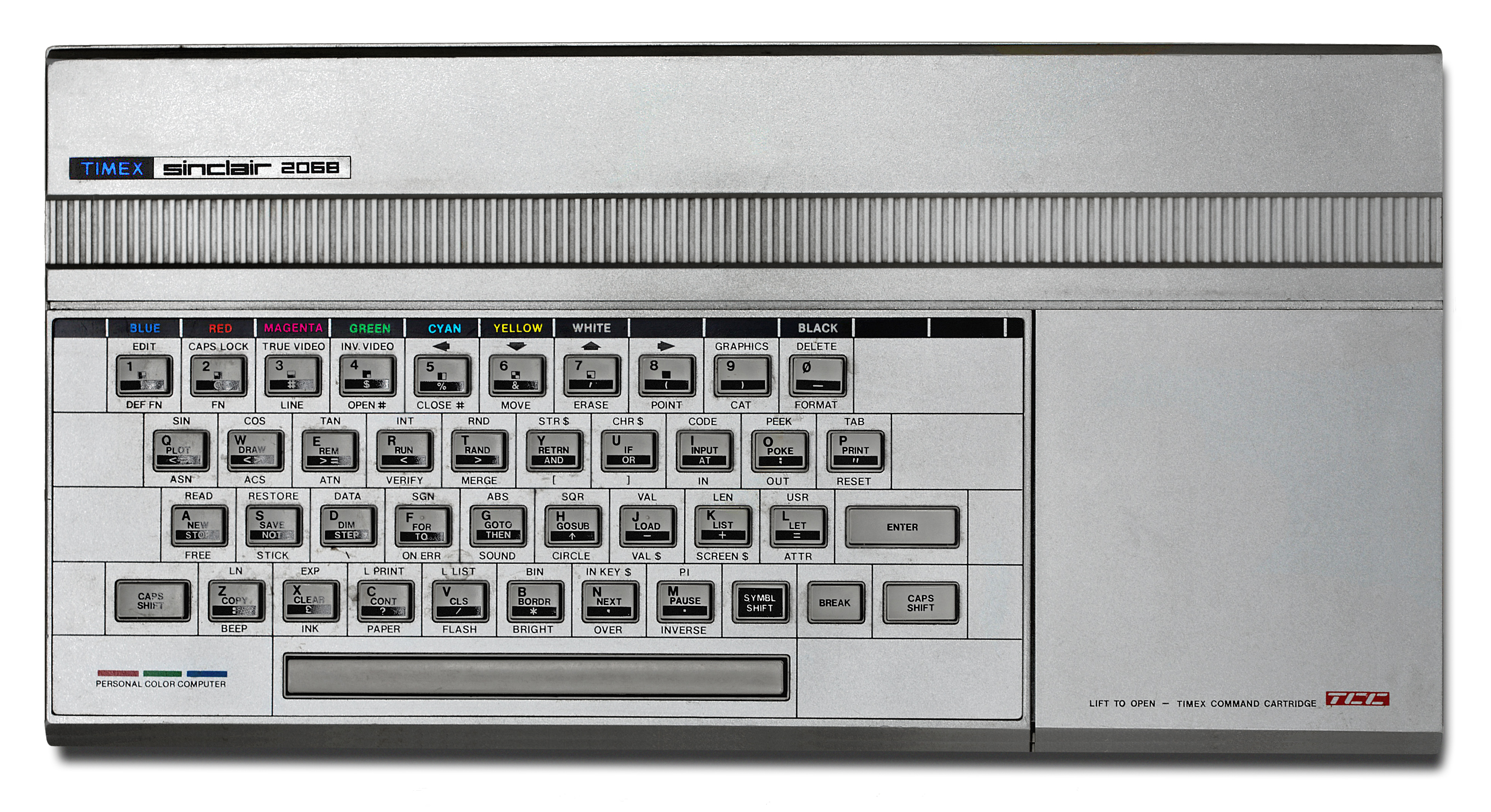
Timex Sinclair 2068

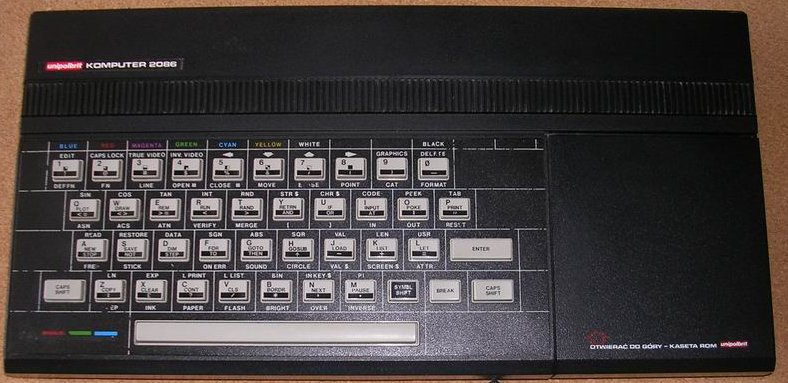
Unipolbrit 2086

=== Timex Computer 2048 ===
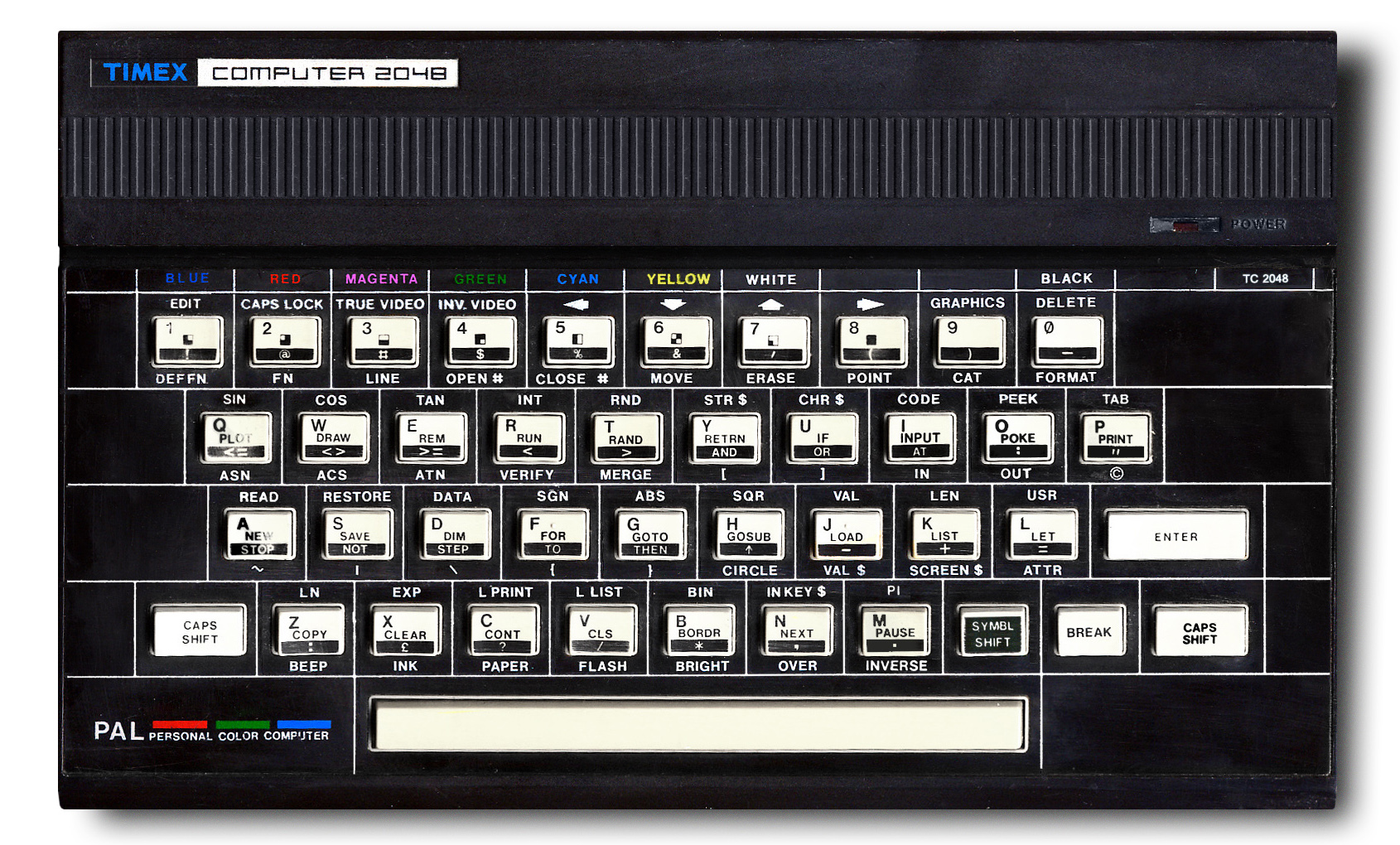
Timex Computer 2048

The Timex Computer 2048 or TC 2048 was a similar machine to the Spectrum 48K, but with the improved ULA from the TC 2068 (allowing access to the improved graphics modes), Kempston joystick port, and composite video output. Marketed only in Portugal and Poland.

=== Timex Sinclair 2048 ===
The Timex Sinclair 2048 or T/S 2048 was a never-released variant of the T/S 2068 with 16 KB of RAM.

=== Inves Spectrum + ===
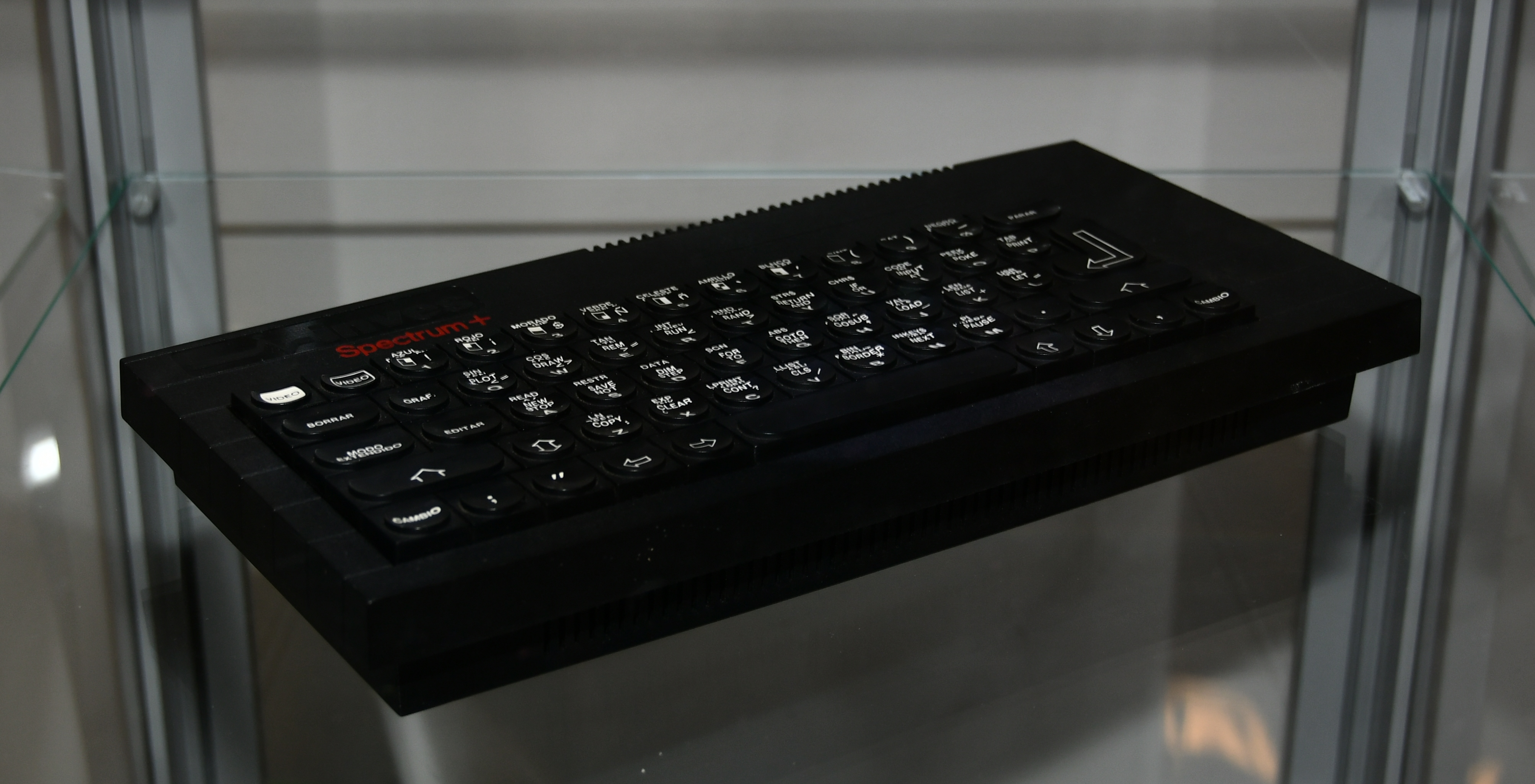
Inves Spectrum +

A clone of the ZX Spectrum+ developed by Investrónica in Spain in 1986, the Inves Spectrum + was based on the work developed by the company on the ZX Spectrum 128. Released just after Amstrad bought Sinclair Research Ltd, it looked much like a regular ZX Spectrum+, but all the internal components were redesigned. As the ROM was also modified, it has compatibility problems with some games – notably Bombjack, Commando, and Top Gun. A Kempston joystick port was fitted on the rear of the machine.

Due to Invéstronica being the distributor of Sinclair's products in Spain, and because Amstrad already had its own exclusive distributor in Spain (Indescomp, later bought by Amstrad itself), Amstrad sued Investrónica in 1987 to cease sales of the computer. The court agreed with Amstrad, but the decision was not issued until 1991, when the computer was discontinued, as the 8-bit computer market in Spain was succeeded by 16-bit computers.

=== Decibels dB Spectrum+ ===
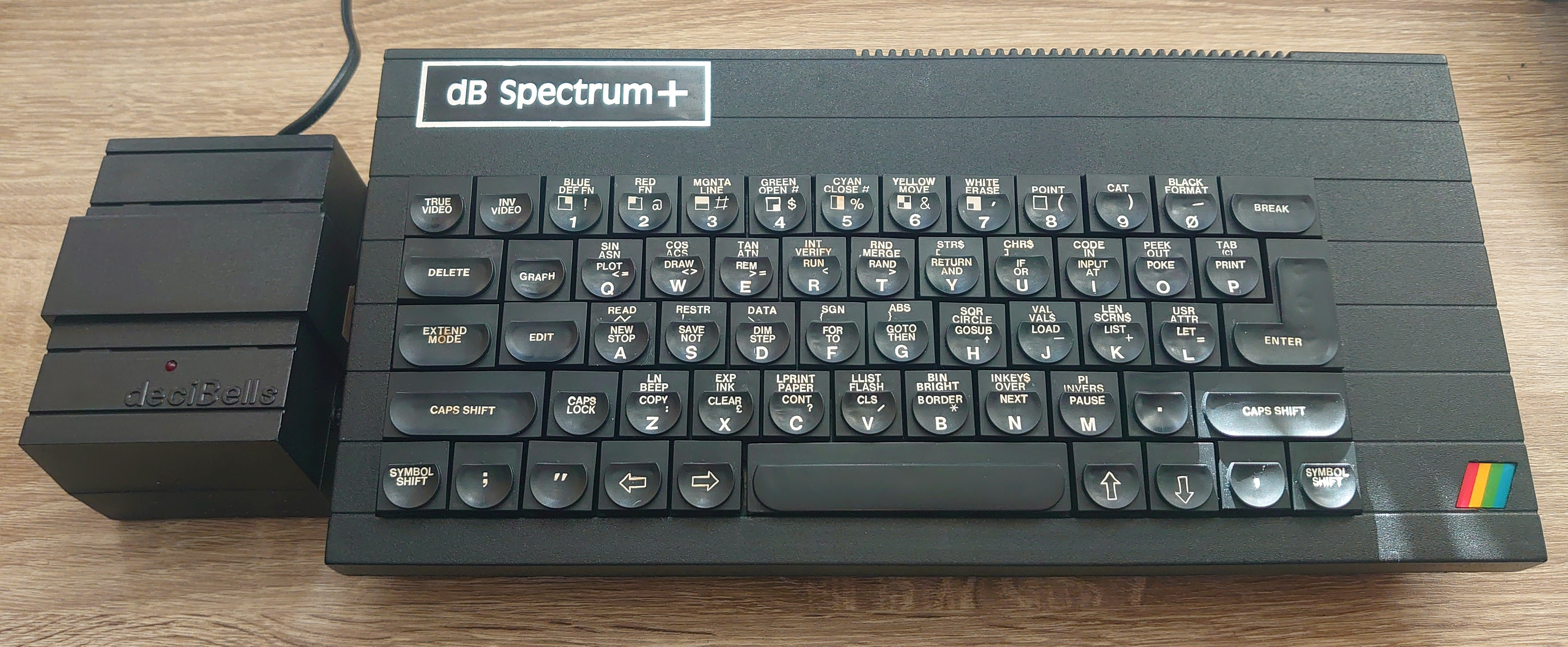
Decibels dB Spectrum+

The Decibels dB Spectrum+ was an official clone of the ZX Spectrum+ for the Indian market, introduced in 1988 by Decibels Electronics Limited, selling over 50000 units and achieving an 80% market share.

== Unofficial ==
=== British ===
==== Harlequin ====
A British clone of the 48K ZX Spectrum, Harlequin was designed and developed by Chris Smith, to aid the reverse engineering of the ZX Spectrum custom ULA chip, and its research documentation. Completed in 2008, it is the first 100% timing compatible clone. Until 2012/13 the Harlequin existed only as a breadboard prototype, but recently, José Leandro Martínez, Ingo Truppel, and others produced a limited number of PCB versions as an exact board replacement for an actual ZX Spectrum.

=== Czech & Czechoslovak ===
==== Bobo64 ====
The Bobo64 was an advanced Czech computer compatible with the ZX Spectrum, developed by Václav Daněček between 1986 and 1987. It has many enhancements over the original ZX Spectrum, including 256×256 graphics with attributes per 8 × 1 pixels, and 512 × 256 graphics. Unlike other Czechoslovak home-made ZX Spectrum clones, the Bobo64 gained some popularity, and was built by dozens of enthusiasts.

==== Didaktik series ====
The Didaktik was a series of home computers produced by Didaktik in Skalica, in the former Czechoslovakia.

The first model compatible with the ZX Spectrum was the Didaktik Gama, based on the U880 or Zilog Z80 processors and the original ULA chip. It was produced in three variants between 1987 and 1989. The Gama has a built-in 8255 chip (used for the Kempston joystick, and also as a printer port) and 80 KB RAM, adding an alternative memory bank from the address 32768 to 65535.

The Gama was followed by the cheaper Didaktik M (first variant released in 1990; the second in 1991). The model M had a modernised case, Sinclair and Kempston Joystick ports, and a keyboard with cursors and reset key. The design, however, was of lower quality than the Gama. Its screen aspect ratio and display timing are different from the original ZX Spectrum because the M uses a different ULA chip, compatible with the Belarusian clone Baltik. It ran at 4 MHz. The final model was the Didaktik Kompakt (1991) which integrated all previous M hardware with a 3.5″ floppy disk drive.

Unlike previous versions, the Didaktik 192K was an amateur project, partly combining the hardware of the Didaktik Gama and the ZX Spectrum 128K.

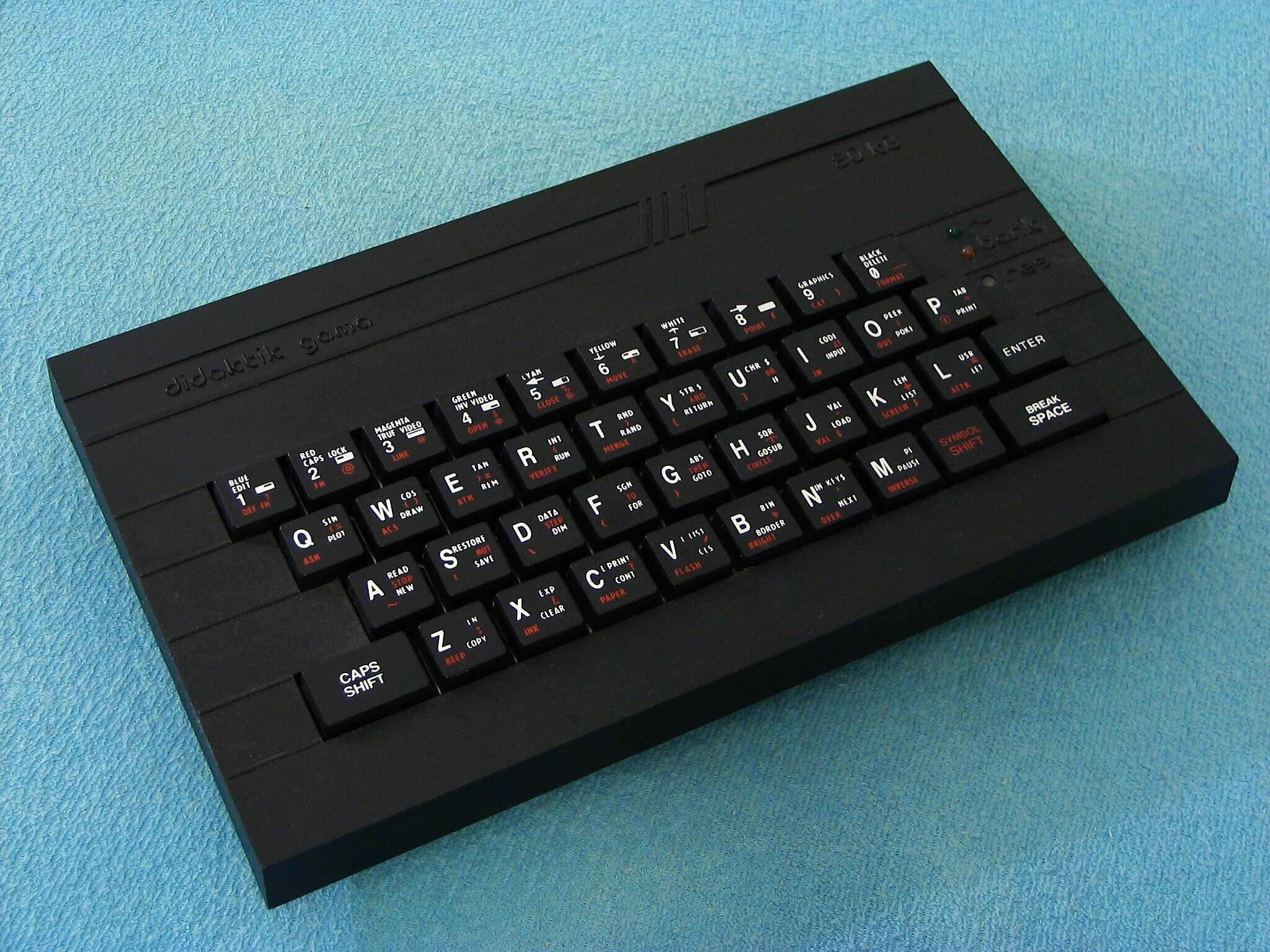
Didaktik Gama (pre 1989 design)

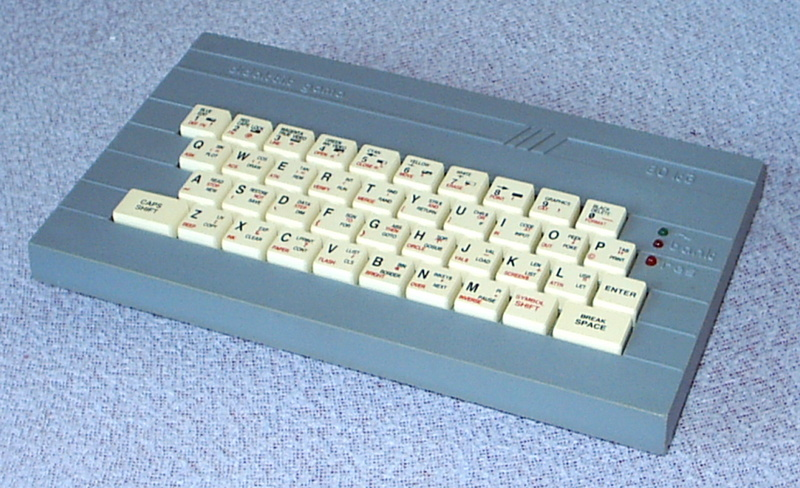
Didaktik Gama (post 1989 design)

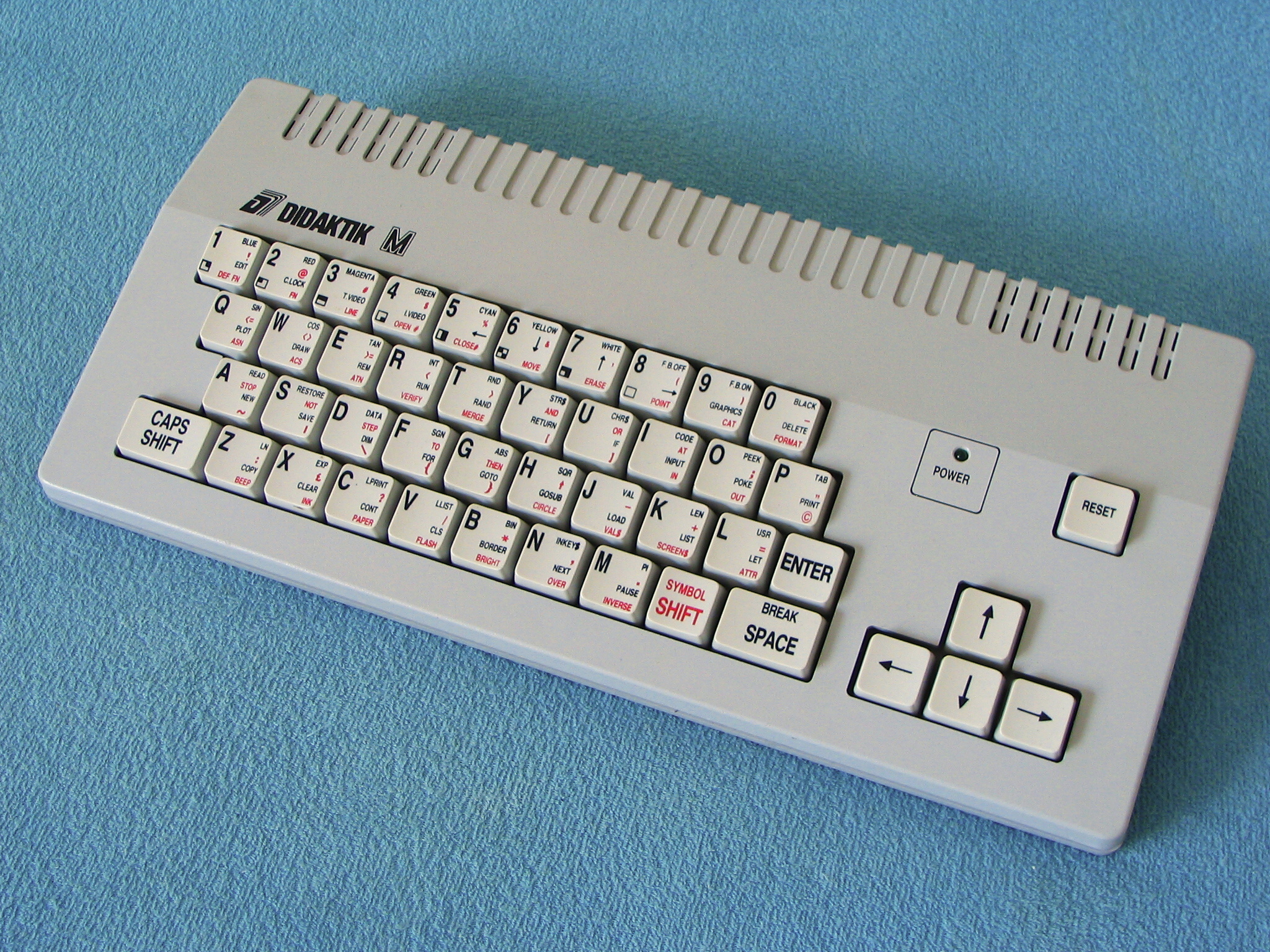
Didaktik M

==== Krišpín ====
The Krišpín was a Czechoslovak clone of the ZX Spectrum, developed by František Kubiš at 1984, a student of EF SVŠT (Electrotechnical Faculty of Slovak Technical University) Bratislava. The ULA was designed using discrete 74xx ICs, which resulted in the screen part of RAM being synchronised perfectly, without CPU blocking.

==== MISTRUM ====
Another Czechoslovak clone of the 48K ZX Spectrum, the MISTRUM, was supplied in kit form. The ROM was modified to include letters with Czech diacritic marks. An article on how to build a Mistrum was published in the Czechoslovak amateur radio magazine Amatérské Radio 1/89.

==== Nucleon ====
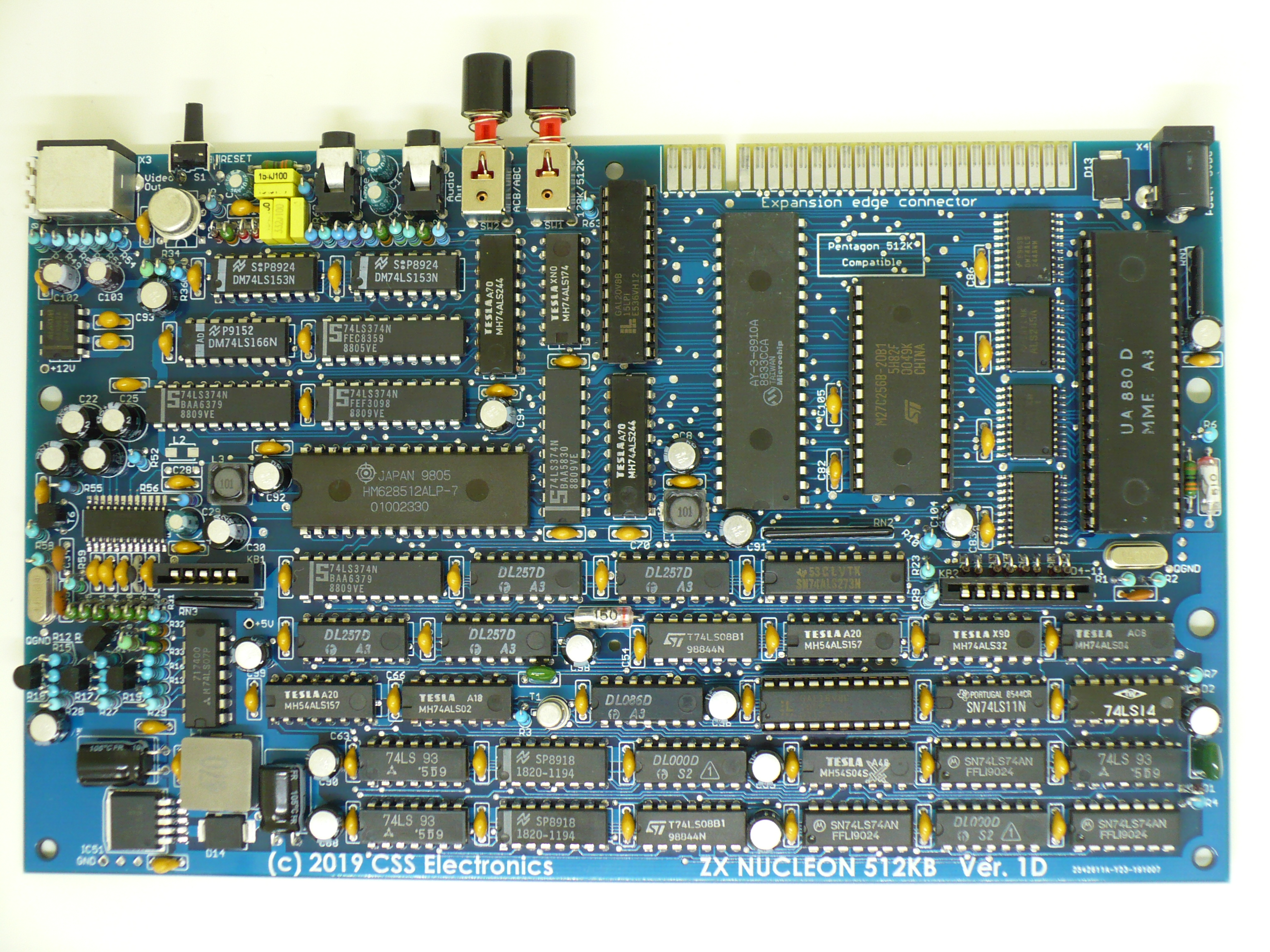
ZX Nucleon 512K ver. 1D

The Nucleon was a Czech clone of the Pentagon 512K, made by CSS Electronics.

==== Sparrow 48K ====
The Sparrow 48K is the first modern clone of the ZX Spectrum designed to replace the original motherboard in standard and Spectrum+ case. Production commenced in 2013. In addition to the use of the original ULA chip, this clone was heavily modernised, replacing part of the larger glue logic with one CPLD chip, the entire main memory with one SRAM chip, and all 8 video memory chips with a second SRAM. The TV modulator has been dropped in favour of a video signal, and the PSU was changed and improved. The Sparrow also offers a larger ROM, which can be increased by 16 KB via a switch or a jumper. The successor is the Sparrow SX, with software ROM switching and RTC.

=== East German ===
==== HCX ====
The HCX was a Spectrum clone developed at the Technical University of Magdeburg in 1988.

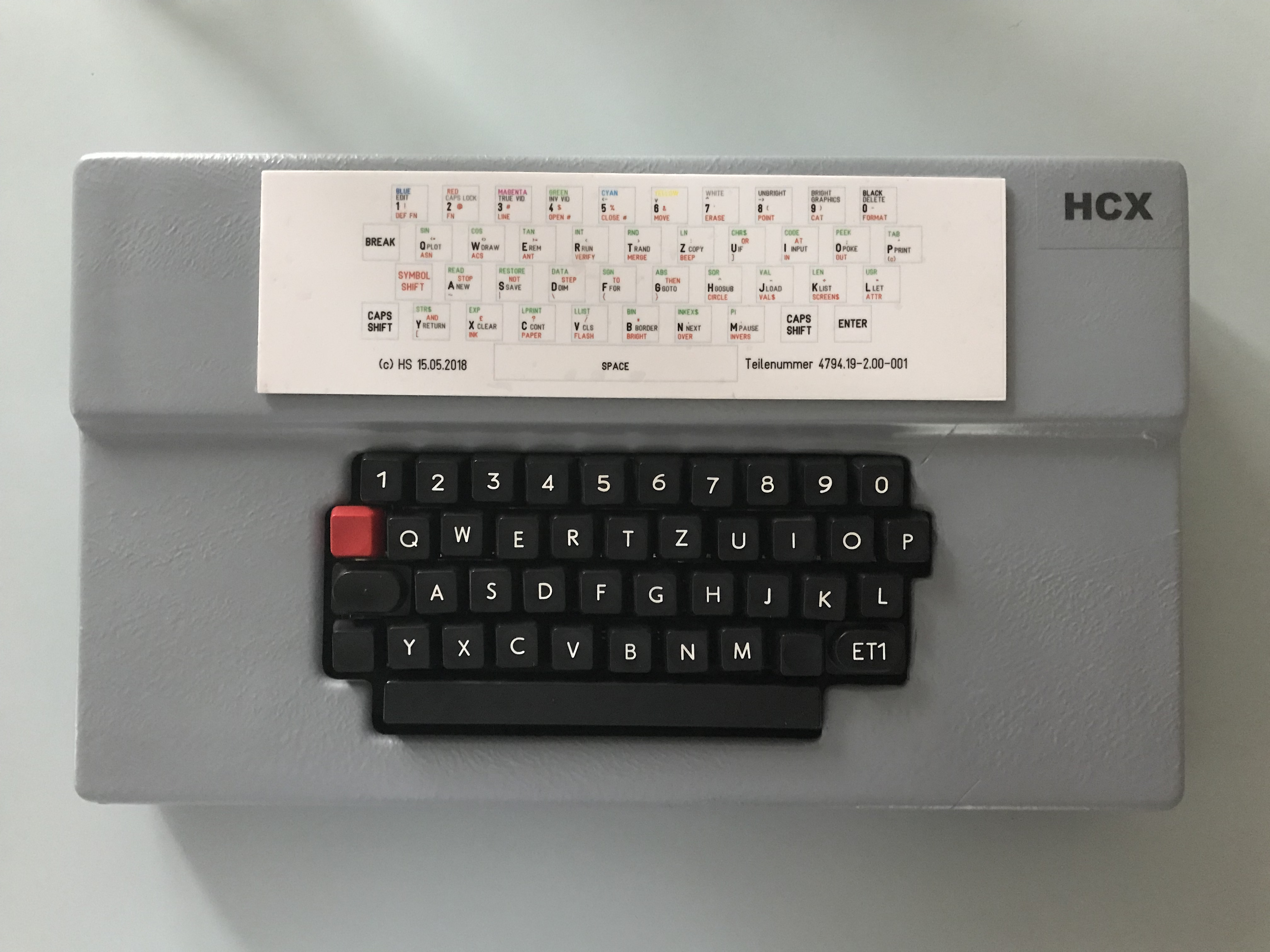
HCX unfinished pre-production sample created in SKET Magdeburg in cooperation with University of Magdeburg

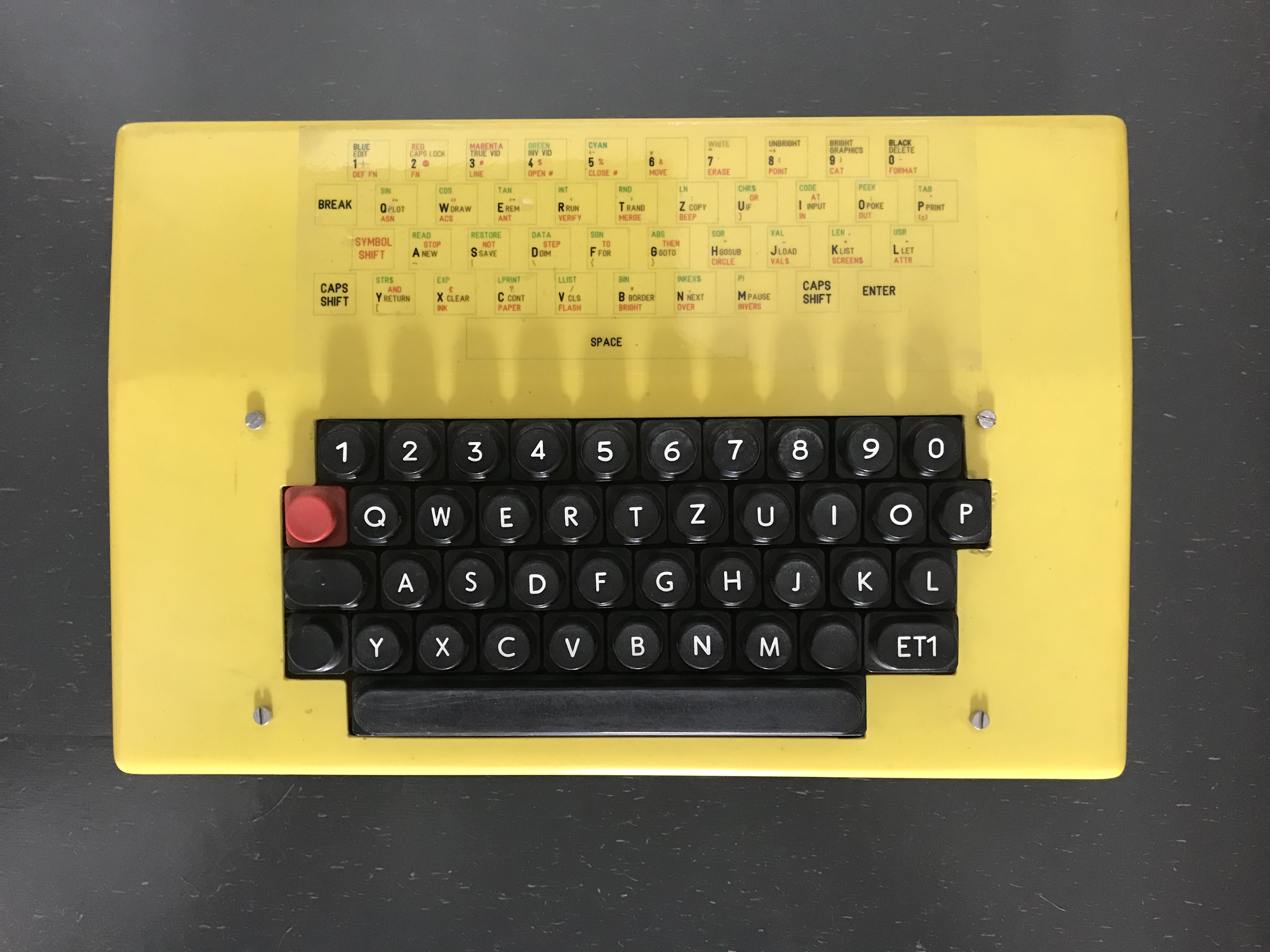
HCX from small series that was not manufactured at SKET Magdeburg

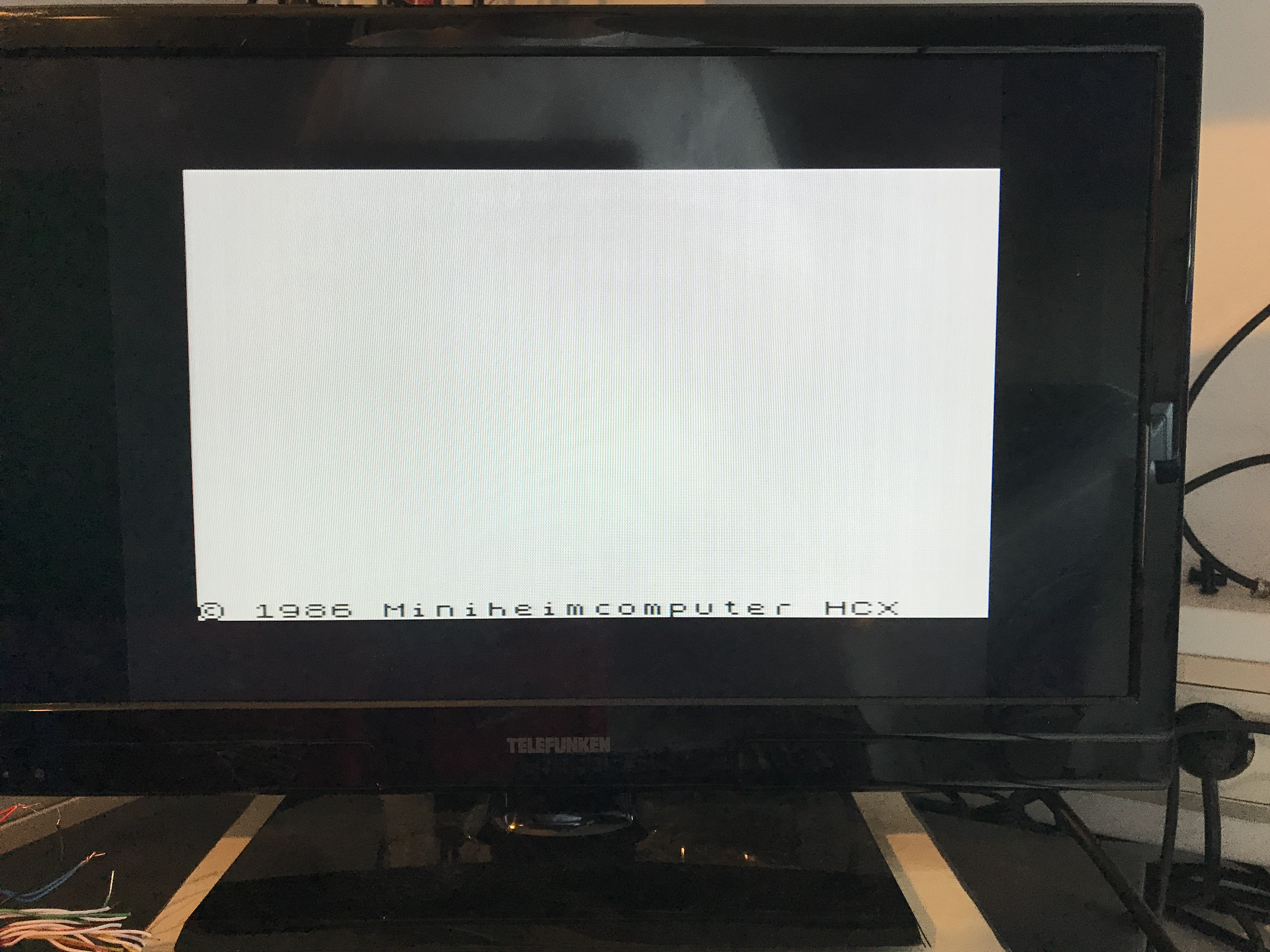
HCX boot screen

==== RR-Spectrum ====
The RR-Spectrum was a privately built East German clone of the ZX Spectrum.

==== Spectral ====
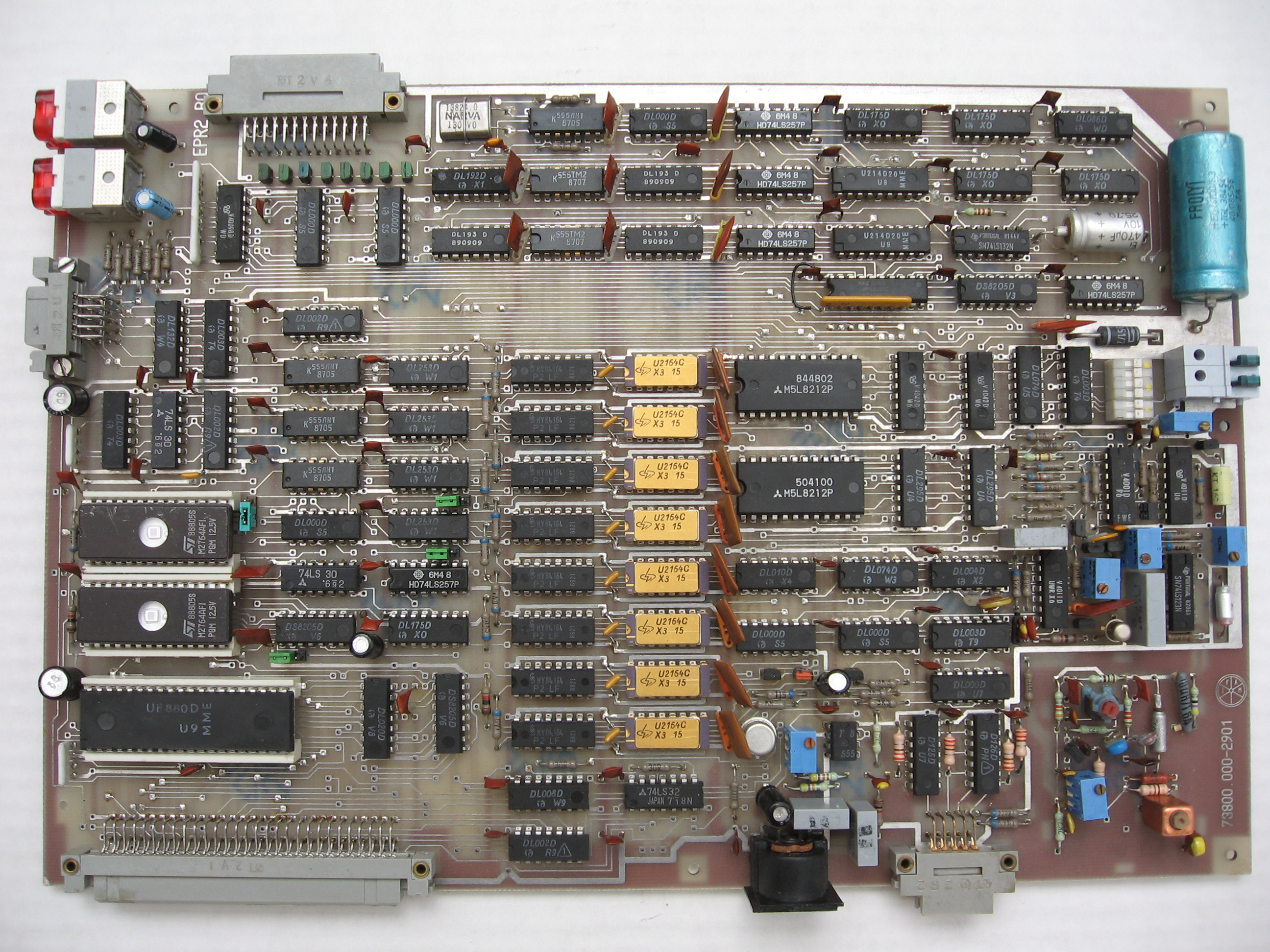
Spectral Platine CPU U880 and 128Kb RAM

Spectral was another An East German clone of the ZX Spectrum. It came with a built-in joystick interface, and either 48 or 128 KB RAM. It was sold in kit form by Hübner Elektronik.

=== Hungarian ===
==== HT 3080C ====
The HT 3080C was a Hungarian ZX Spectrum clone made by Híradástechnikai Szövetkezet (Telecommunication Technology Cooperative), and released in 1986. It was the third computer from the company. The two first computers (HT 1080Z and HT 2080Z) were clones of the TRS-80, and were unsuccessful because of the poor graphics features and high price. They were both school computers.

In 1986, Hungarian school computers were required to meet two criteria: produce high resolution graphics, and support letters with Hungarian diacritic marks. The HT 3080C was produced to satisfy both these criteria, and was also designed to be compatible with the previous HT machines, with the option of switching between TRS-80 and ZX Spectrum mode. It had a graphics resolution of 256 × 192 (the ZX Spectrum standard) and an AY-chip for sound (for compatibility with previous HT machines).

It featured a 32 KB ROM, 64 KB RAM, and (uniquely) a Commodore serial port which enabled the connection of peripherals for the C64 (e.g. the 1541 floppy disk drive).

=== Polish ===
==== Elwro 800 Junior ====
The Elwro 800 Junior was Polish clone of the ZX Spectrum produced by ELWRO for use in schools. It ran a special version of CP/M called CP/J. The computer had a full size keyboard, and even a paper/document holder. The reason for the latter is that the machine shares the same case as the Elwirka electronic keyboard, which had provisions for holding sheet music. Peripherals were attached to the computer using a mix of DIN and D-subminiature connectors.

ELWRO had developed a local area network protocol called JUNET (JUnior NETwork) for use with the machines which operated on a basis not unlike MIDI, in which one DIN cable was used to receive data, and another to send it. In this manner, the teacher was able to monitor what all the students in the class were doing on their computers.

The updated Elwro 804 Junior PC had an internal 3.5″ disk drive.

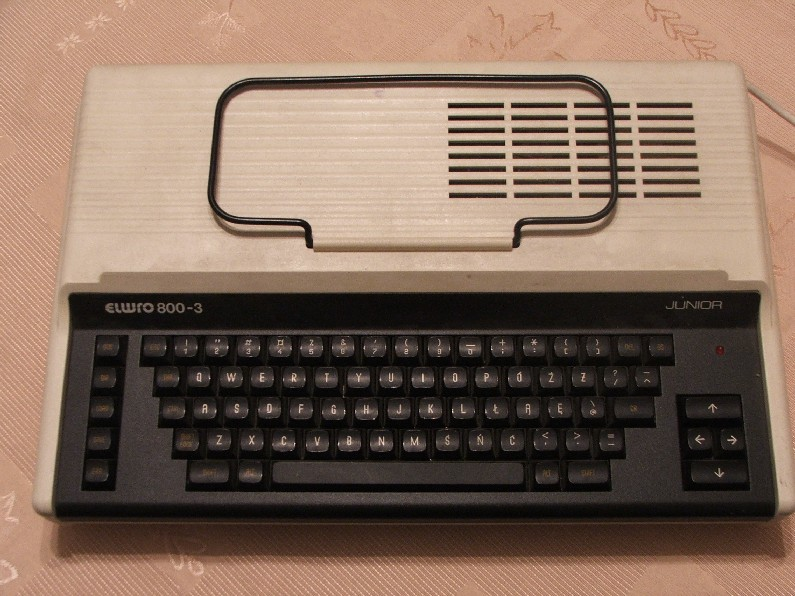
Elwro 800 Junior

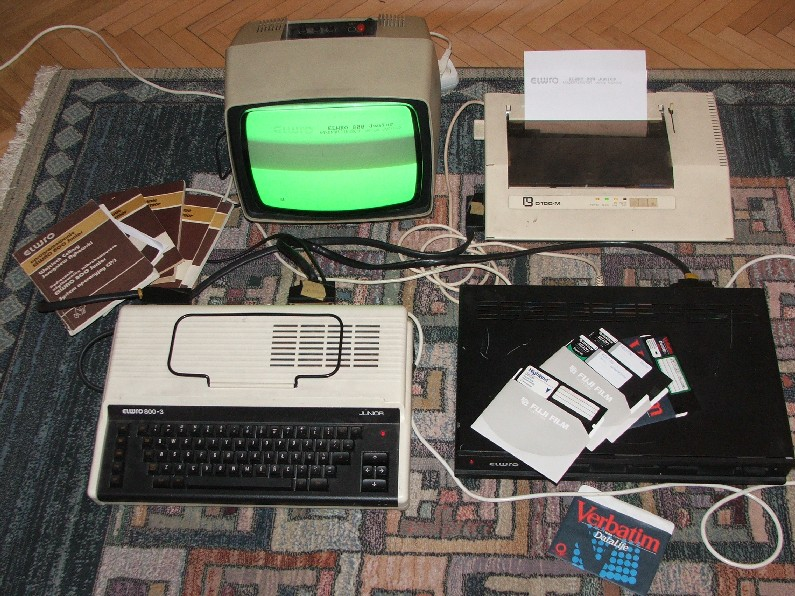
Elwro 800 Junior system

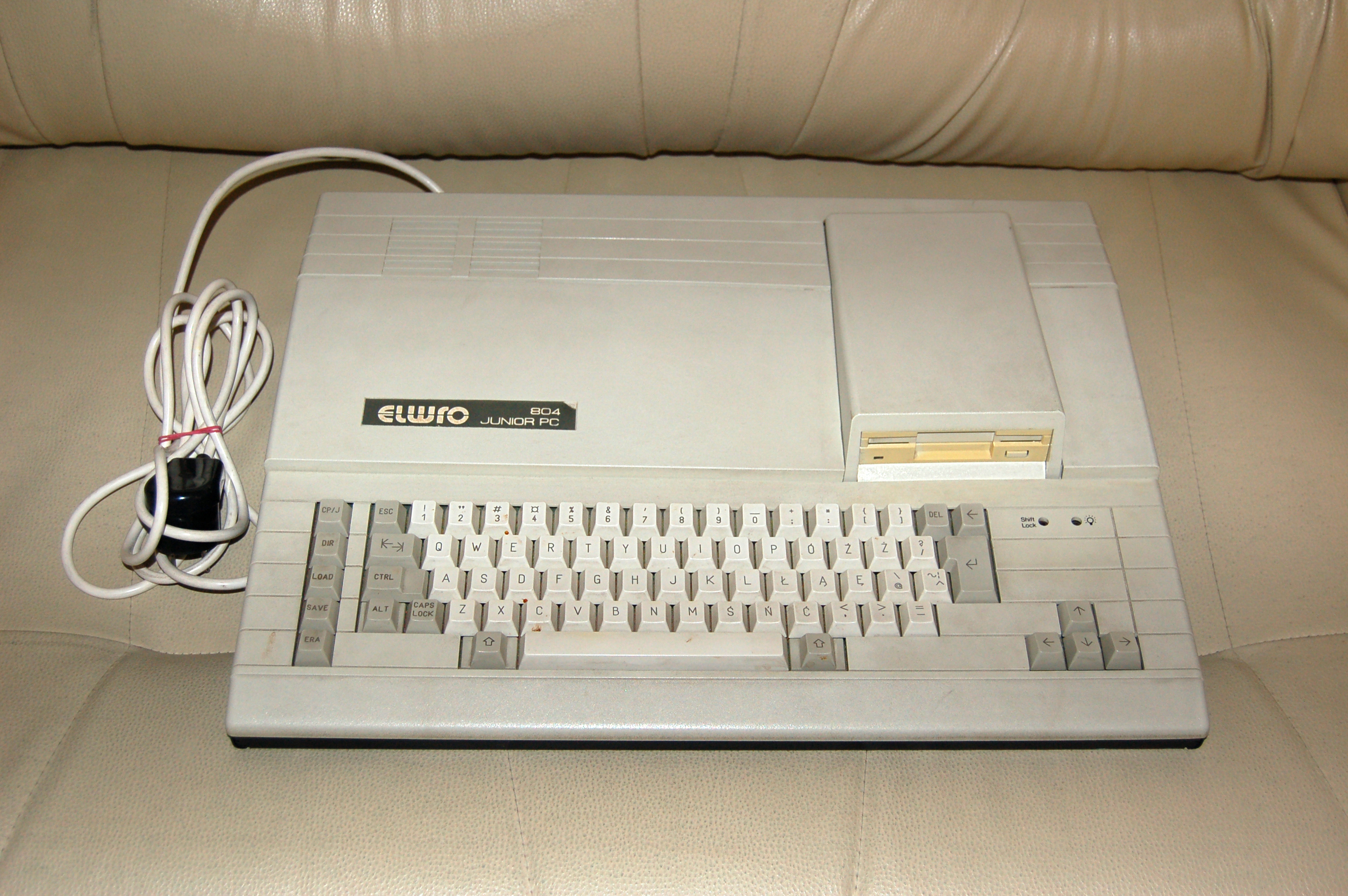
Elwro 804 Junior PC

=== Portuguese ===
==== IODO ====
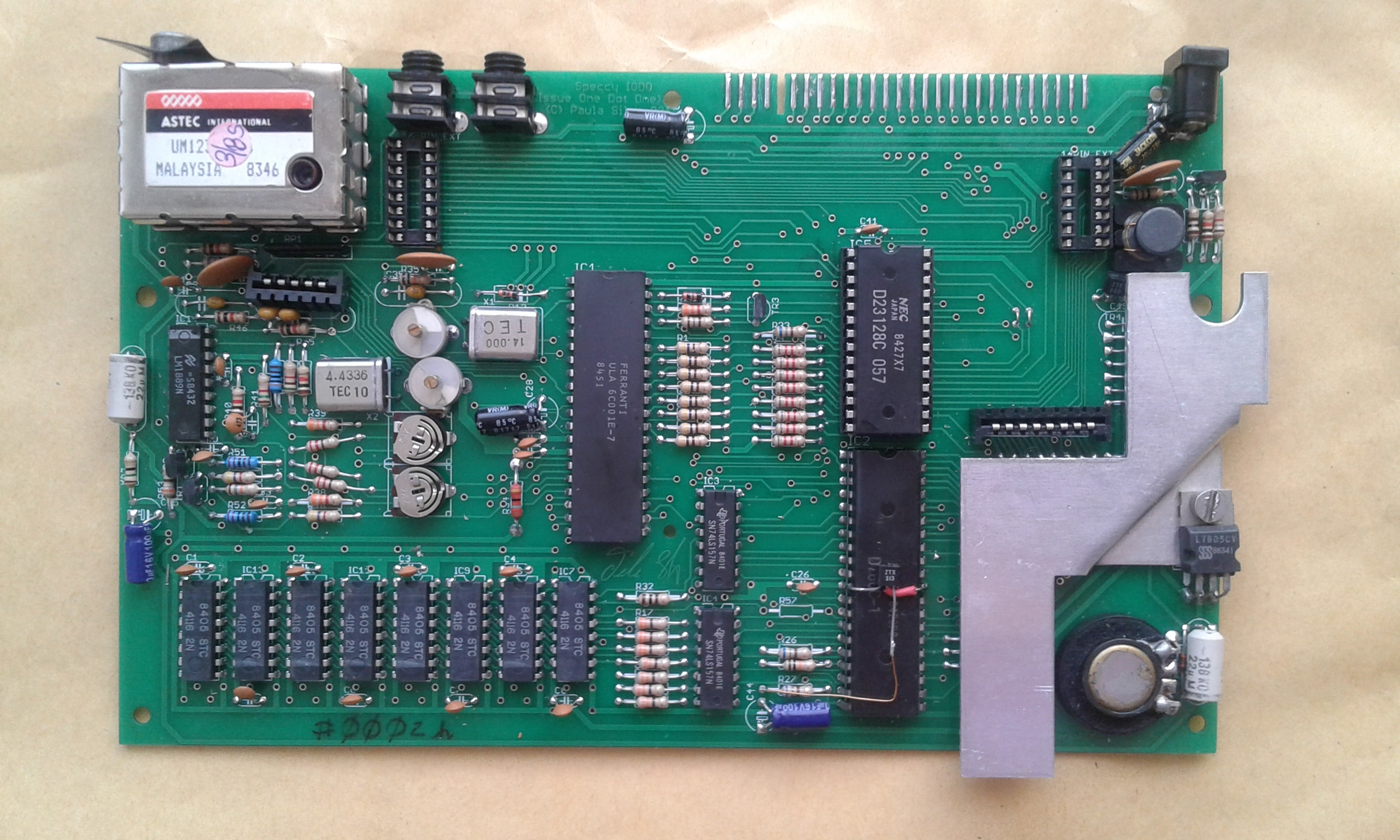
IODO S/N #0002h

The IODO (Issue One Dot One) was created in Portugal by Consultório da Paula (now PSiTech) in 09 January 2019. It is a clone of the original 16 KB ZX Spectrum issue one, and it's on display on LOAD ZX museum in Cantanhede, Portugal.

=== Romanian ===
==== CoBra ====
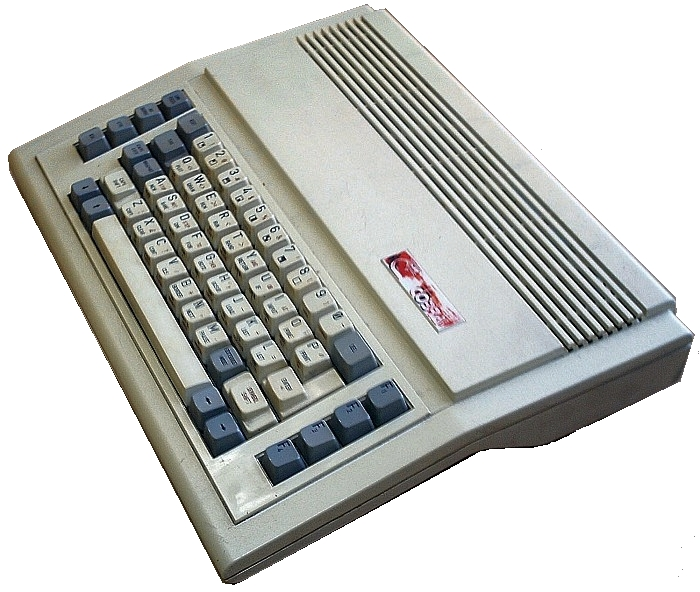
CoBra ZX Spectrum clone

The CoBra (COmputer BRAsov) was a ZX Spectrum clone built in Braşov, Romania in 1988. ROM contained the OPUS and CP/M operating systems.

==== CIP series ====
The CIP are Romanian ZX Spectrum clones made by Întreprinderea Electronică. CIP stands for Calculator pentru Instruire Personală ("Computer for Personal Education"). The ROM is original Sinclair, but has been modified to display 'BASIC S' in place of the standard Sinclair copyright message. Only one set of 8 × 1-bit 64 KB RAM modules is present.

The initial version, CIP-02, had a low quality 2 KB EEPROM with a propensity for fast data loss, and BASIC had to be loaded from tape. CIP-03 was a version of the EEPROM designed to work with the 3 data densities on the tape at speeds up to 3 times higher than the original, and the 2K ROM was also capable of loading and saving at those speeds, using the whole 64K as storage. The top data density was often hit and miss; very good magnetic tape had to be used, and a special monophonic cassette recorder could be bought separately for best results. Produced from 1988 to 1993 it was a common clone in Romania, with about 15,000 units produced. CIP-04 was a ZX Spectrum +3 clone with a built-in floppy disk drive and 256 KB RAM.

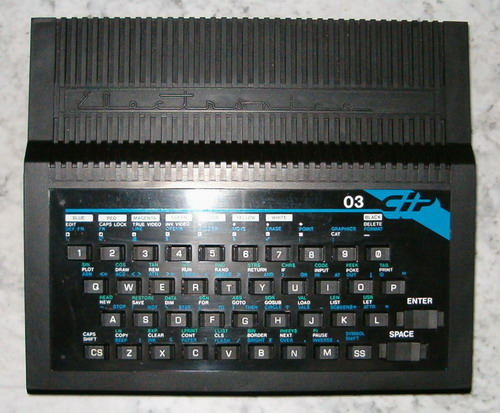
Romanian Electronică CIP-03 (blue version)

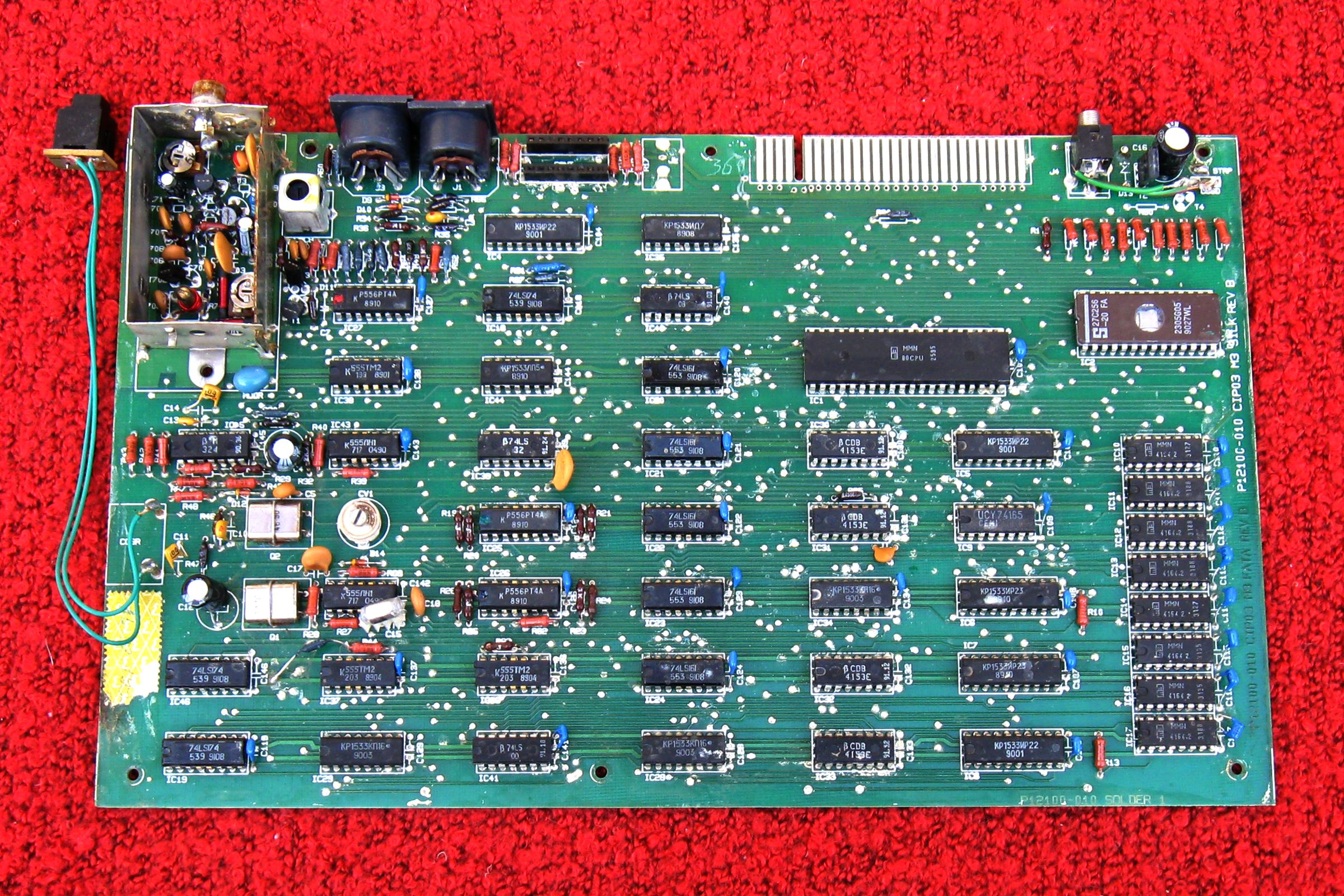
"CIP" microcomputer motherboard

==== Felix HC series ====
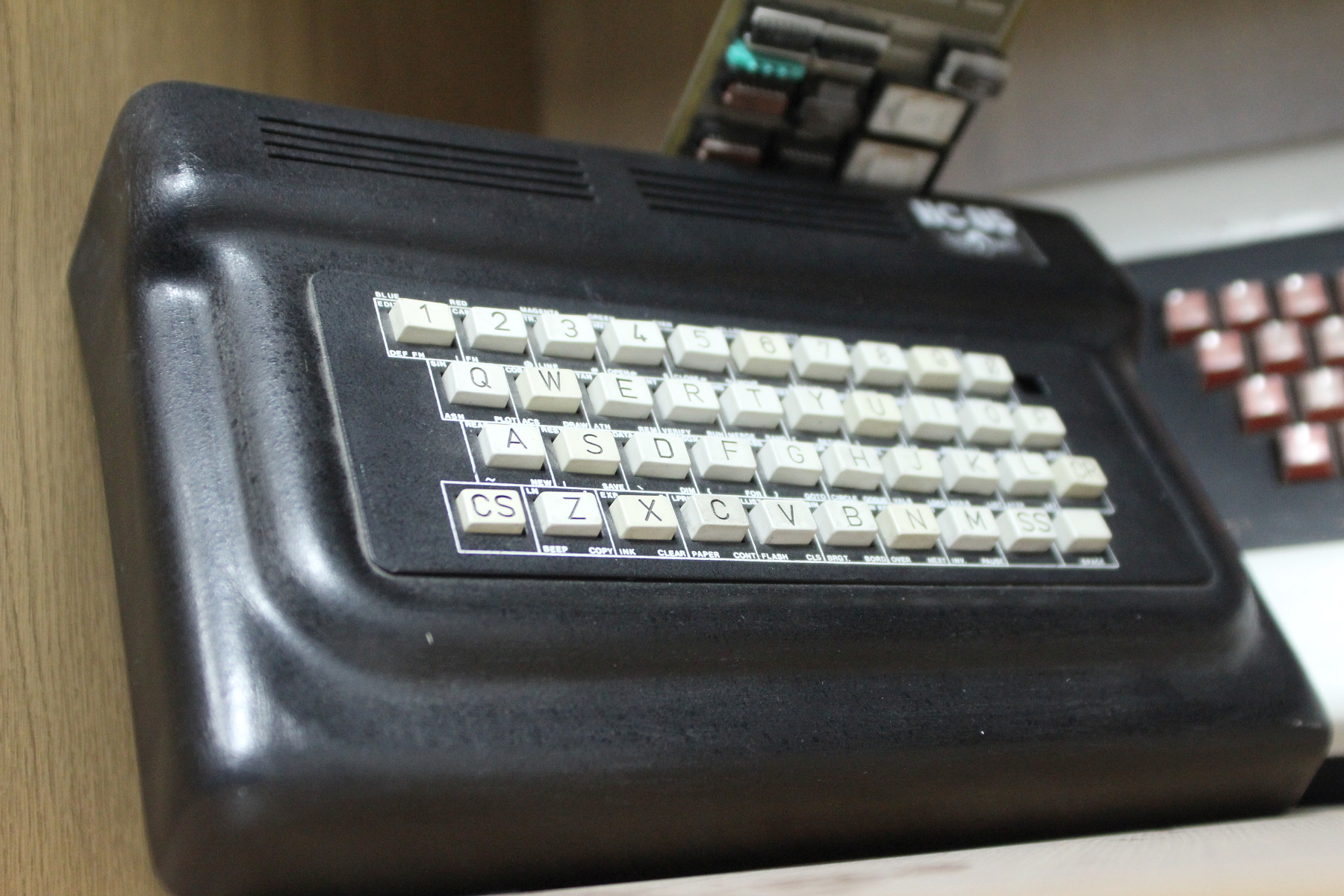
HC 85

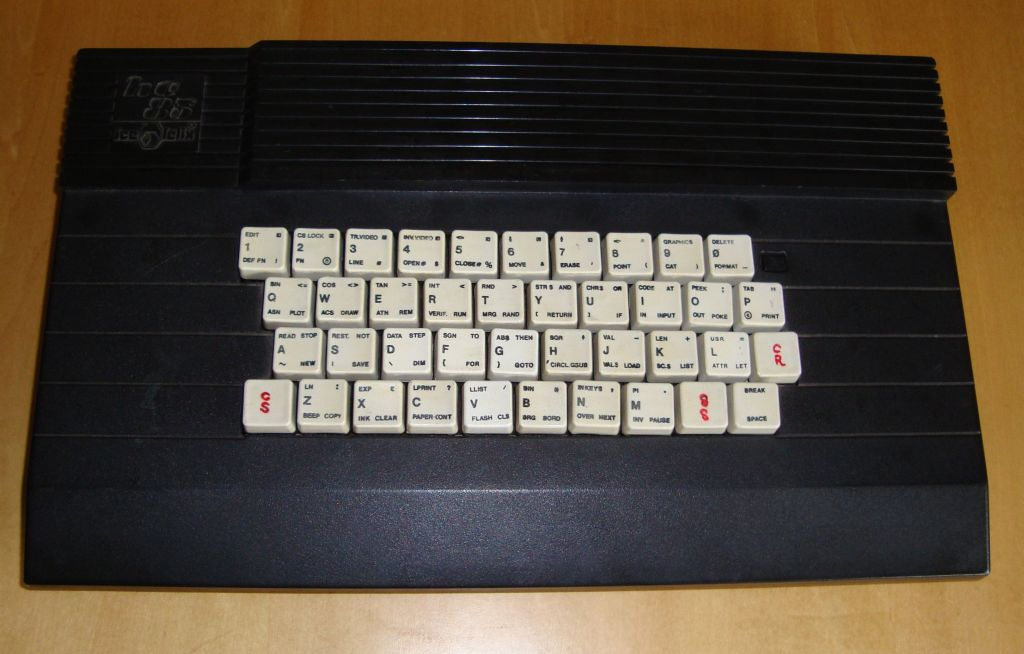
HC85+

Felix HC are a series of ZX Spectrum clones manufactured in Romania from 1985 to 1994 by ICE Felix. The HC designation stands for Home Computer, and for the first four models in the series, the number indicates the year of first manufacture. Models in the series were: HC 85, HC 88, HC 90, HC 91, HC91+ (HC128), HC 2000 and HC386.

The earliest version (HC 85) closely resembled the Spectrum, with a built-in BASIC interpreter, Z80A processor, 48 KB RAM, tape, and TV interfaces. It was used in schools/universities, and as a personal computer.

An optional Interface 1 expansion was available for the HC 85, HC 90, and HC 91. It was functionally similar to the ZX Interface 1, but instead of Microdrives it supported single-density or double-density floppy disks.

The HC 90 had a redesigned circuit board supporting fewer, larger memory chips; it was functionally equivalent to the HC 85.

The HC 91 had a modified keyboard with 50 keys instead of 40. It had 64 KB RAM, and extra circuitry which provided CP/M support if the Interface 1 expansion was also present.

The HC 2000 (manufactured from 1992 to 1994) had a built-in 3.5-inch 720 KB floppy disk drive, and 64 KB RAM. It could be used both as a Spectrum clone with added disk functionality (only 48 KB RAM available) or in CP/M mode, giving access to the full 64 KB memory. Essentially, it consolidated the HC 91, Interface 1, and floppy disk drive into a single case.

The last model to be made in the Z80 line was the HC91+. It was a ZX Spectrum 128K clone in a HC91 case and keyboard, and had some compatibility problems. For the first time, the AY-8910 sound chip was offered as an add-on service, and was soldered on the board by factory technicians. Demoscene demos had problems running multi-colour effects, and displaying sound VU meter-like effects, through lack of data in the AY chip.

==== JET ====
JET was a Romanian clone from 1989 produced by Electromagnetica. JET is an acronym for Jocuri Electronice pe Televizor ("Electronic Games on Television").

==== Timisoara series ====
The Timisoara series were Romanian ZX Spectrum clones developed in a university of Timișoara. Its name is a portmanteau of Timişoara and Spectrum. The first model, TIM-S, It had Source (ALIM) parallel and serial connectors, as well as ports for connecting a cassette recorder, and television set. Later models (microTIM, microTIM+ and TIM-S+) were equipped with a joystick port, and came with 128 KB RAM and an AY-3-8912 sound chip. Production continued into the early 1990s.

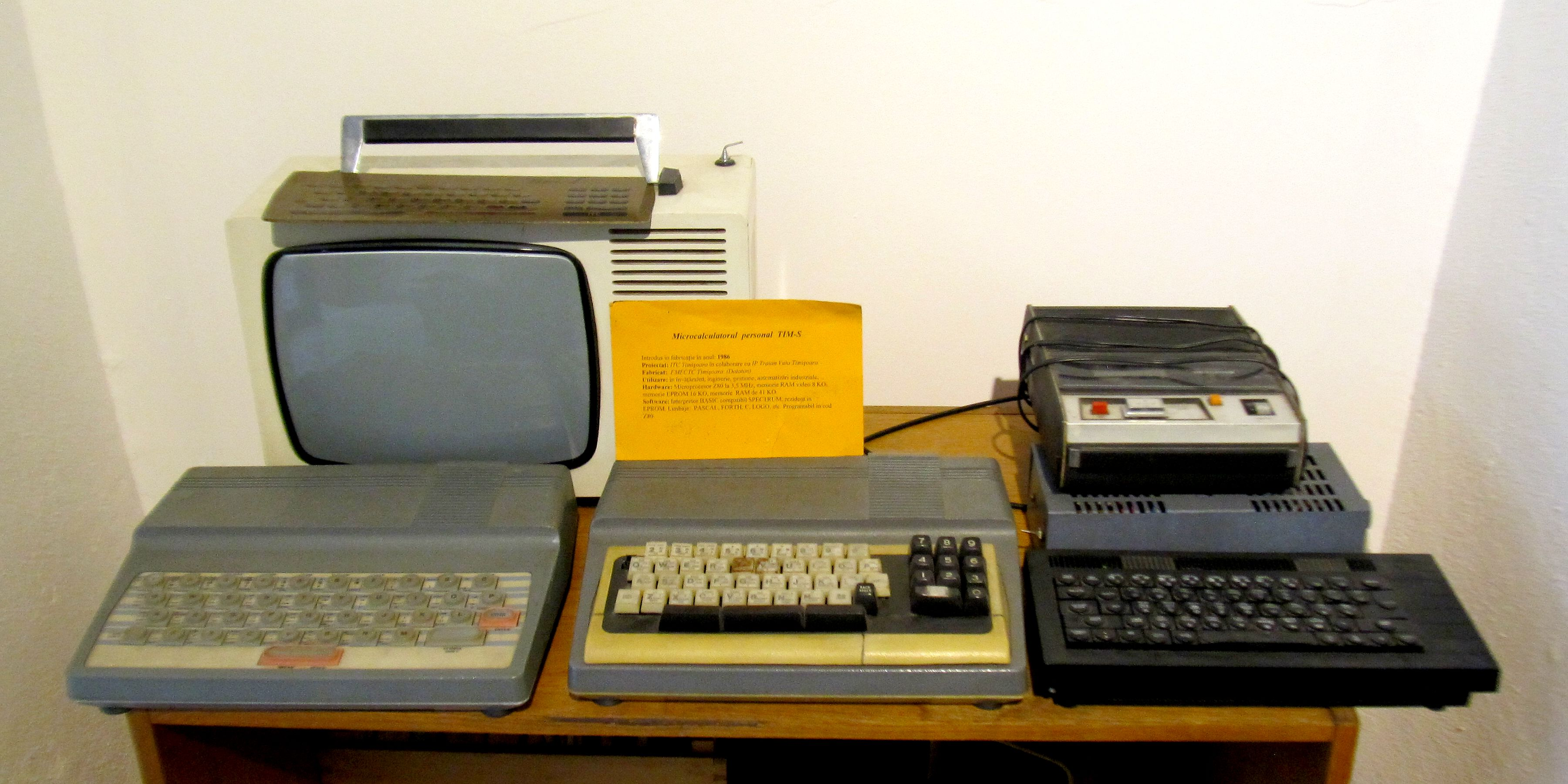
TIM-S computers with peripherals

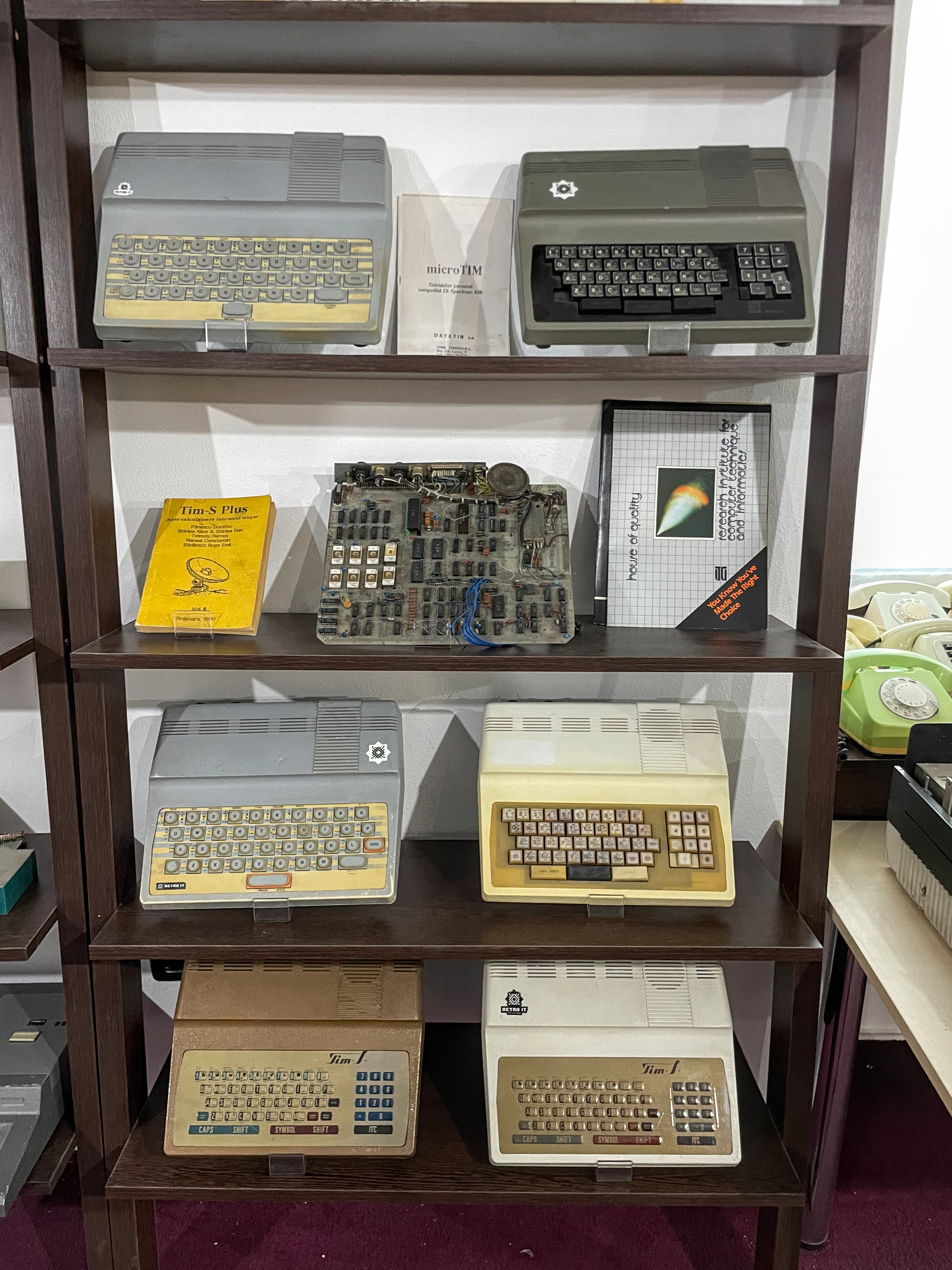
MicroTIM ZX Spectrum compatible computer

==== Sages ====
Sages V1 was a ZX Spectrum clone with audio and joystick connectors placed on the front of the case, and a keyboard similar to that of the Ice Felix HC-85K.

==== Pandora ====
Pandora was a ZX Spectrum clone, sold by a private engineer from Buzău. It had larger EPROM, allowing switch between classic Spectrum and a customized mode (character using a bold typeset, Pandora message displayed on startup, etc.).

=== South American ===
==== Czerweny CZ ====
The Czerweny CZ 2000, Czerweny CZ Spectrum and Czerweny CZ Spectrum Plus were Argentinian ZX Spectrum clones which were produced from 1985 until an electrical fire destroyed the factory in Paraná in June 1986.

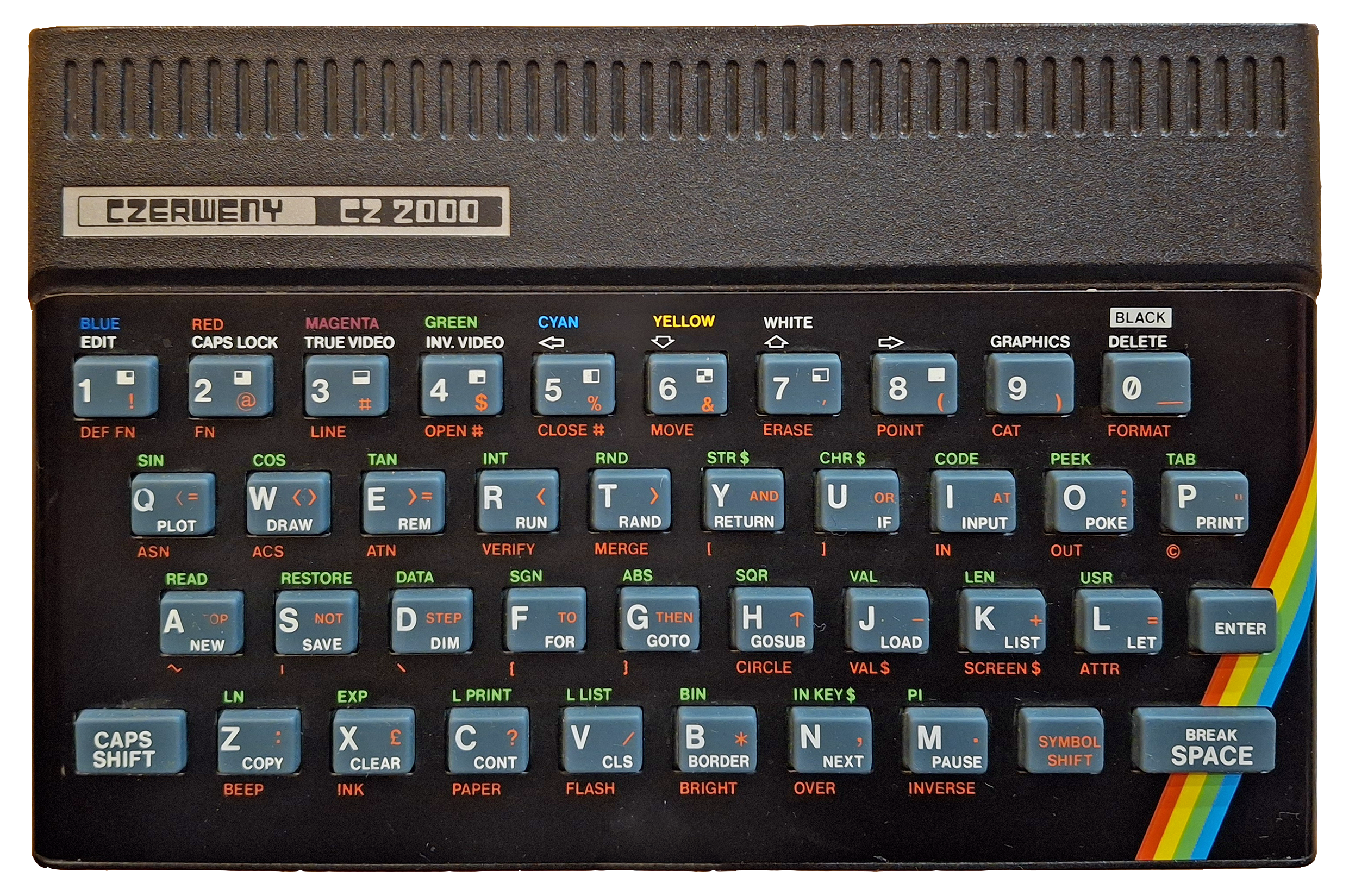
CZ 2000

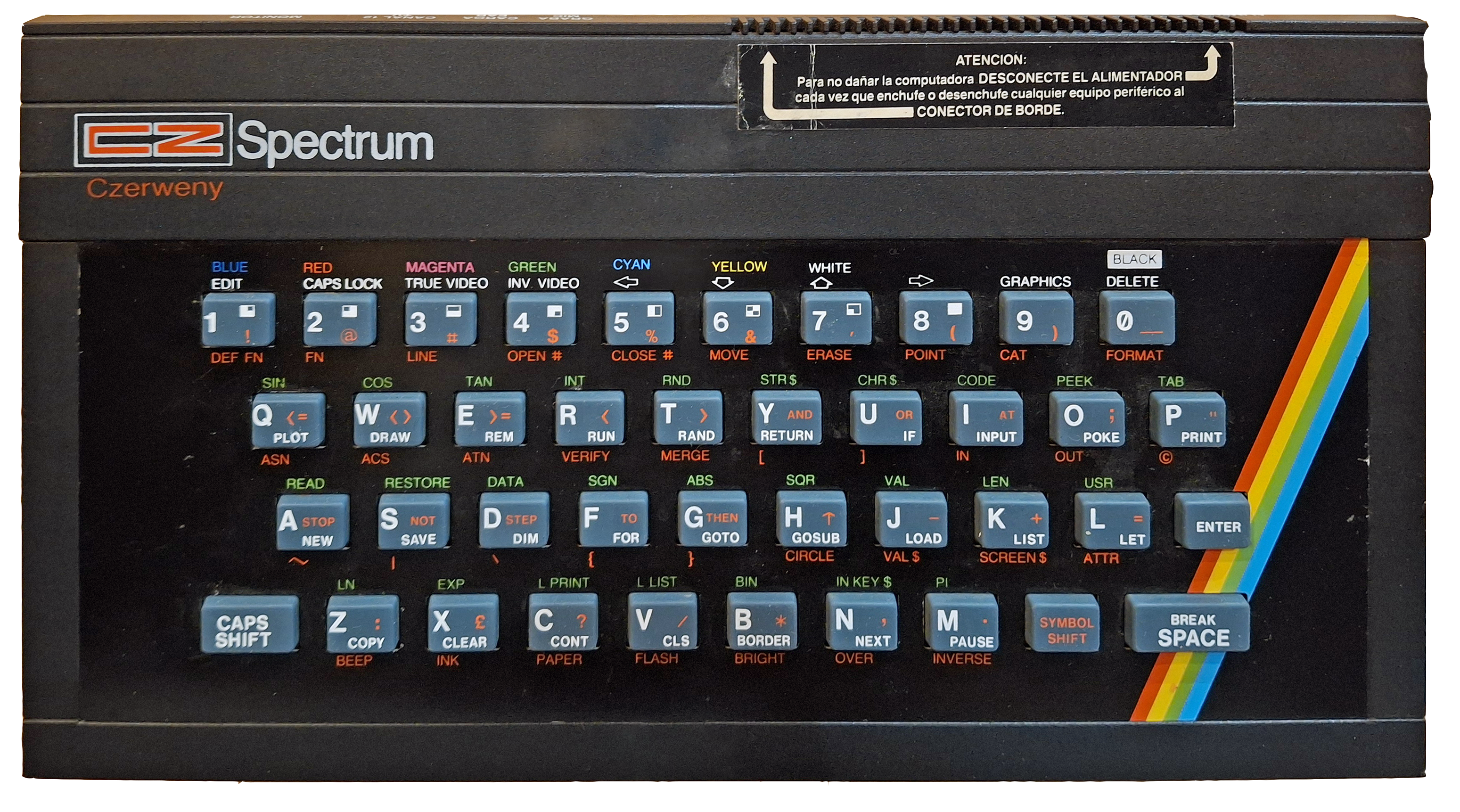
CZ Spectrum

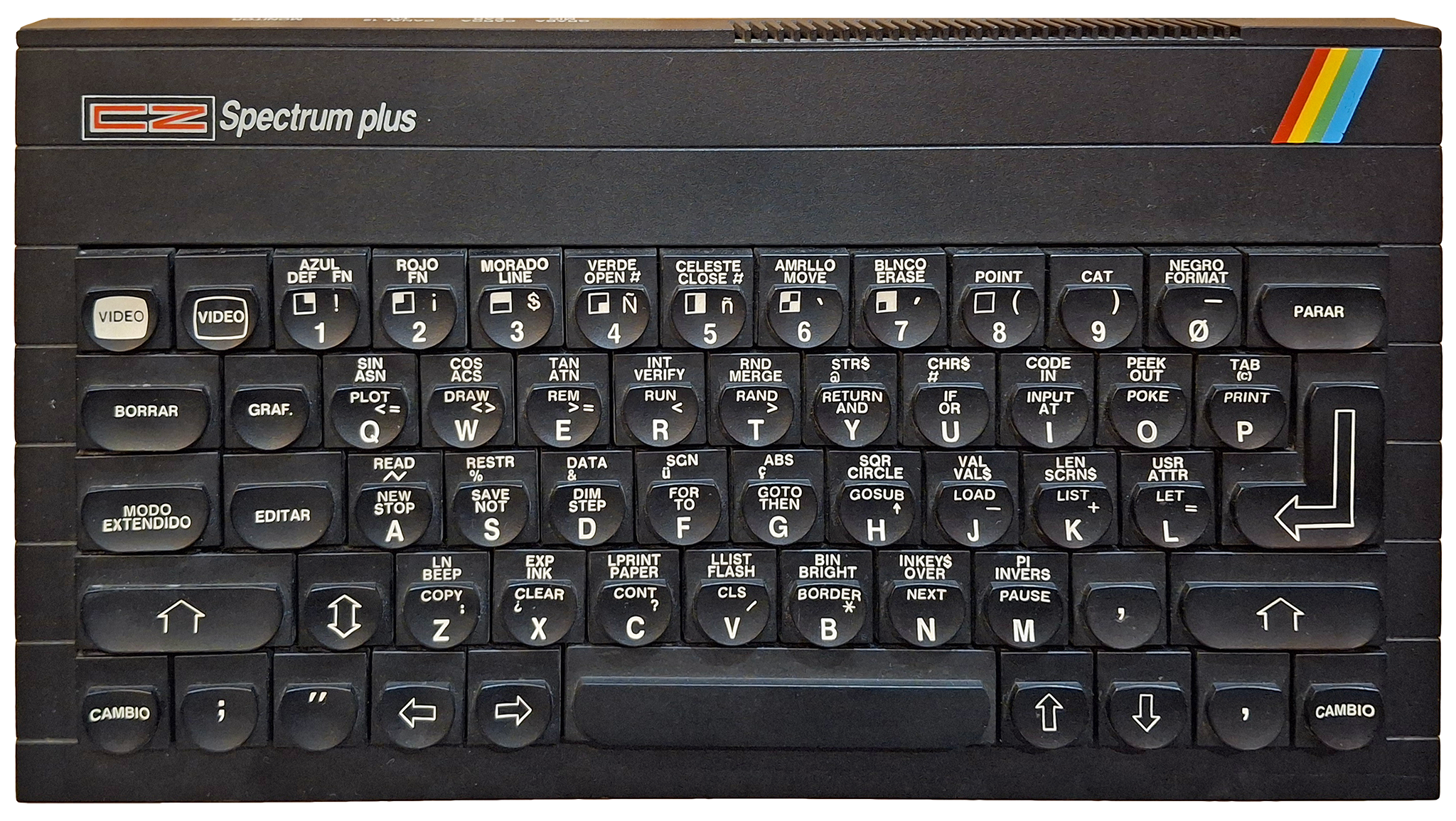
CZ Spectrum plus

==== Microdigital TK90X ====
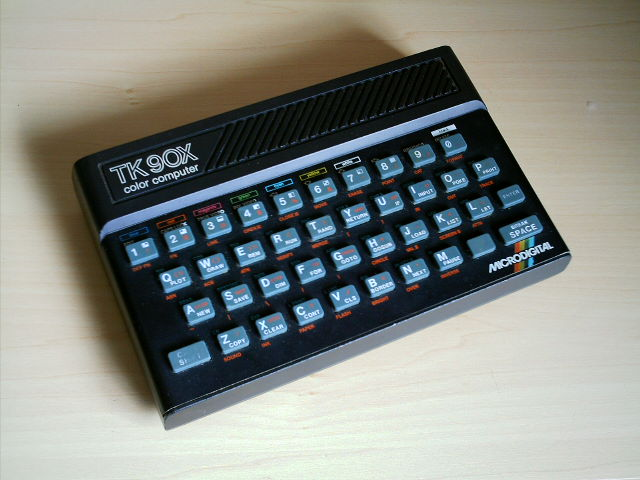
Microdigital TK90X

The TK90X was the first Brazilian ZX Spectrum clone. It was launched in 1985 by Microdigital Eletronica, a company located in São Paulo, Brazil, which had previously manufactured ZX81 clones (TK82, TK82C, TK83, and TK85) and a ZX80 clone (TK80). The ROM was hacked to include a UDG editor, and accented characters. In spite of this, incompatibility issues with ZX Spectrum software are very rare. The keyboard membrane is more durable than that found on the original ZX Spectrum 48K. The TK90X also features a Sinclair-compatible joystick port.

==== Microdigital TK95 ====
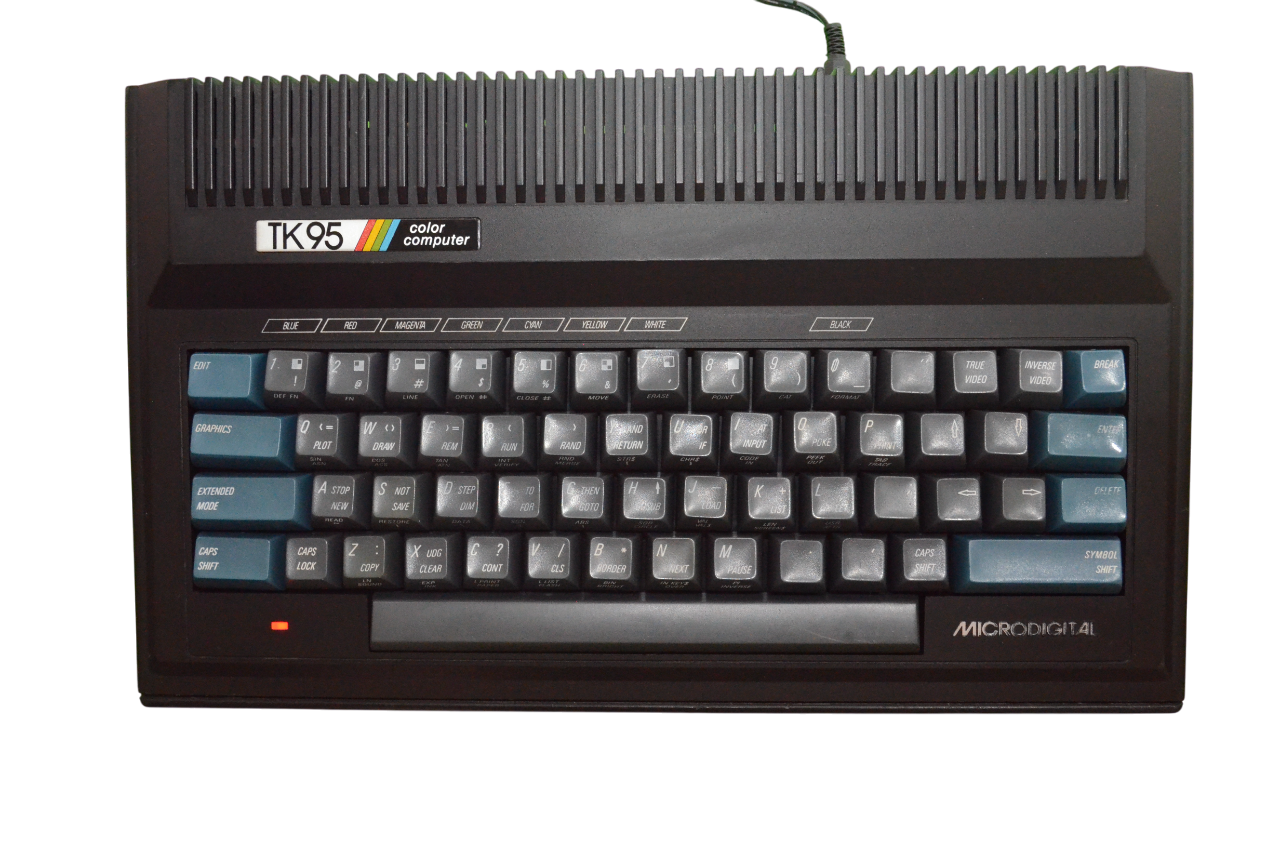
Microdigital TK95

The TK95 microcomputer was the successor to the TK90X. Launched in November 1986, its improvements were largely cosmetic, as it uses exactly the same PCB as the TK90X, but had its ROM capacity increased to 16 KB.

=== South Korean ===
==== Samsung SPC-650 ====
The Personal Computer SPC-650 was a South Korean clone of the ZX Spectrum+ by Samsung, with a similar design to the original machine.

=== Soviet/Russian ===
==== ALF TV Game ====
A game console based on the ZX Spectrum 48, developed by the Brest Special Design Bureau "Zapad" and produced by the " Tsvetotron " plant. Cartridges are a board with ROM chips and a page decoder (the cartridge is accessed through 16K pages).

==== AZX-Monstrum ====
A Spectrum-compatible computer based on the Zilog Z380 (a 32-bit version of the Z80, capable of running at 40 MHz). Development started in 1999 and was abandoned in 2001.

==== Anbelo/C ====
Produced as a kit for assembly and as a finished computer by the Research Institute of Precision Technology (Zelenograd), the Angstrem plant and the Anbelo MGP (Belozersky).

==== Arus ====
The Arus (ru: Арус) is a ZX Spectrum clone based on the Pentagon. Developed in the early 1990s it was produced at the Iset plant in Kamensk-Uralsky. It has supports the Russian language in the BASIC interpreter and TR-DOS operating system.

==== ATM Turbo ====
The ATM Turbo (ru: АТМ-ТУРБО) was developed in Moscow in 1991 by two companies: MicroArt and ATM. It featured a 7 MHz Z80 processor, 1024 KB RAM, 128 KB ROM, AY-8910 sound chip (two were fitted in upgraded models), 8-bit DAC, 8-channel ADC, RS-232 and Centronics ports, Beta Disk Interface, IDE interface, AT/XT keyboard, text mode (80×25, 16 possible colours in an 8×8 pattern), and two additional resolutions of 320 × 200 and 640 × 200 pixels. A substantial part of the ATM design was transferred to the Baseconf core of the ZX-Evolution computer.

==== Baltica ====
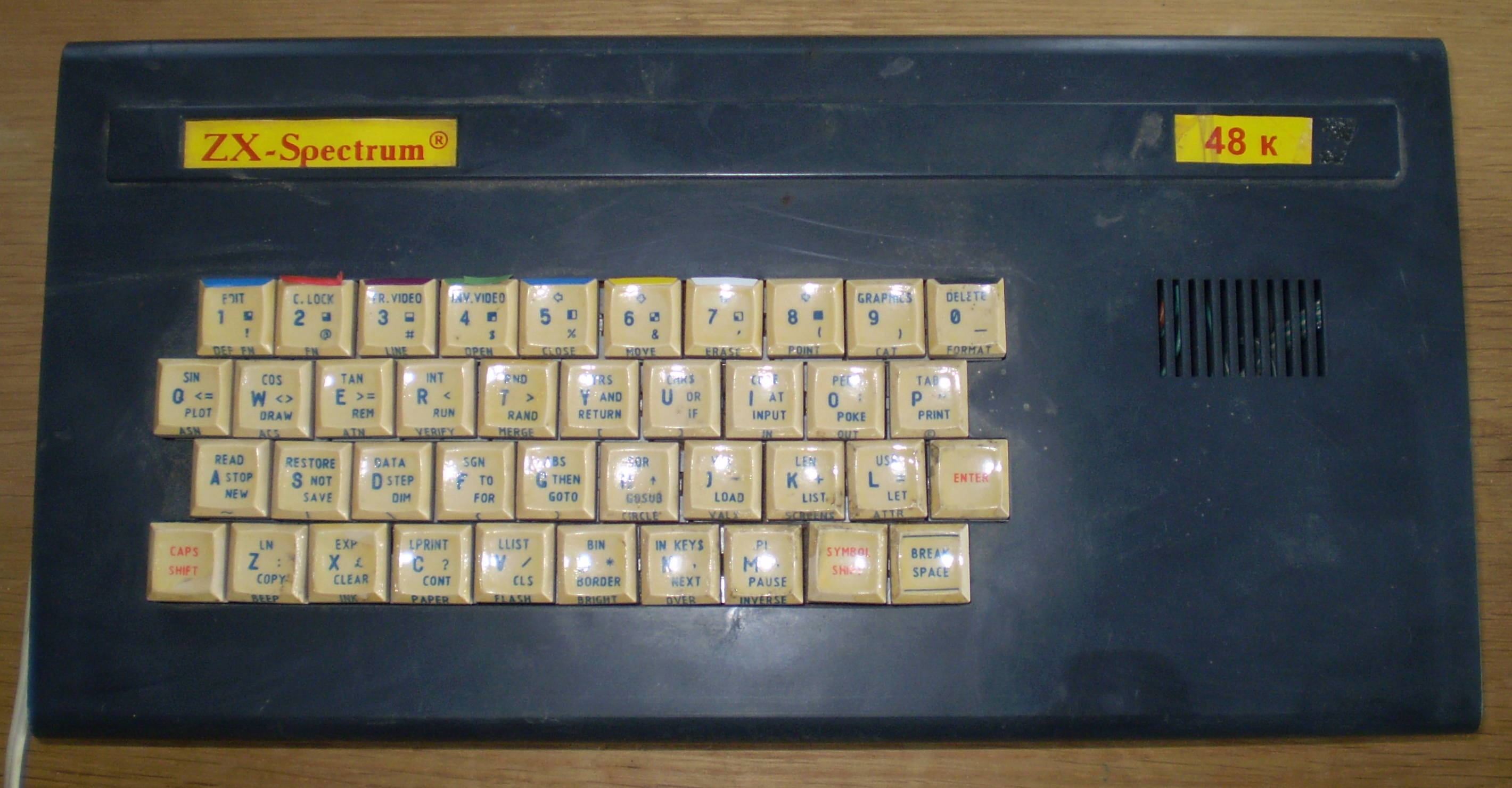
Baltic Sonet

Baltica (or Baltic, ru: Балтик) was a Soviet clone of the 48K ZX Spectrum. Its CPU Z80 ran at a higher frequency (4 MHz) which made it less compatible. It was first released in 1988 by a company named Sonet from Minsk and different versions exist, with expanded hardware and operating systems, compared to the original ZX Spectrum.

==== Best III ====
The Best III was a ZX Spectrum clone made in St. Petersburg in 1993. The size of the system unit is 16.8 × 10 × 2 1/2 inches (426.72 × 254 × 63.5 mm). Its CPU is a Russian Z80 clone.

==== Bi Am ZX-Spectrum 48/64 and 128 ====
The Bi Am ZX-Spectrum 48/64 was Russian clone of the ZX Spectrum produced between 1992 and 1994. The system unit is made of metal, and measures 10 × 8.4 × 2 inches (254 × 213.36 × 50.8 mm). The Bi Am ZX-Spectrum 128 was a 128 KB version of the same computer.

==== Blic ====
Blic (ru: Блиц) or Blitz is a Soviet clone of the ZX Spectrum 48K, designed in 1990, and based on the earlier Leningrad clone. The ROM had been modified to display “BLIC Home Computer” alongside three rectangles which were respectively coloured blue, red, and green. The firmware contained a modified font of the Latin and Cyrillic alphabet. Keyboard layouts were switched between Cyrillic and Latin using the POKE 23607.56 and POKE 23607.56 commands, respectively. The layout of the Cyrillic keyboard is YaWERT (яверт) rather than the more familiar JCUKEN. The keys were made of rubber, and their size and placement was virtually identical to that on the original ZX Spectrum 48K.

==== Byte ====
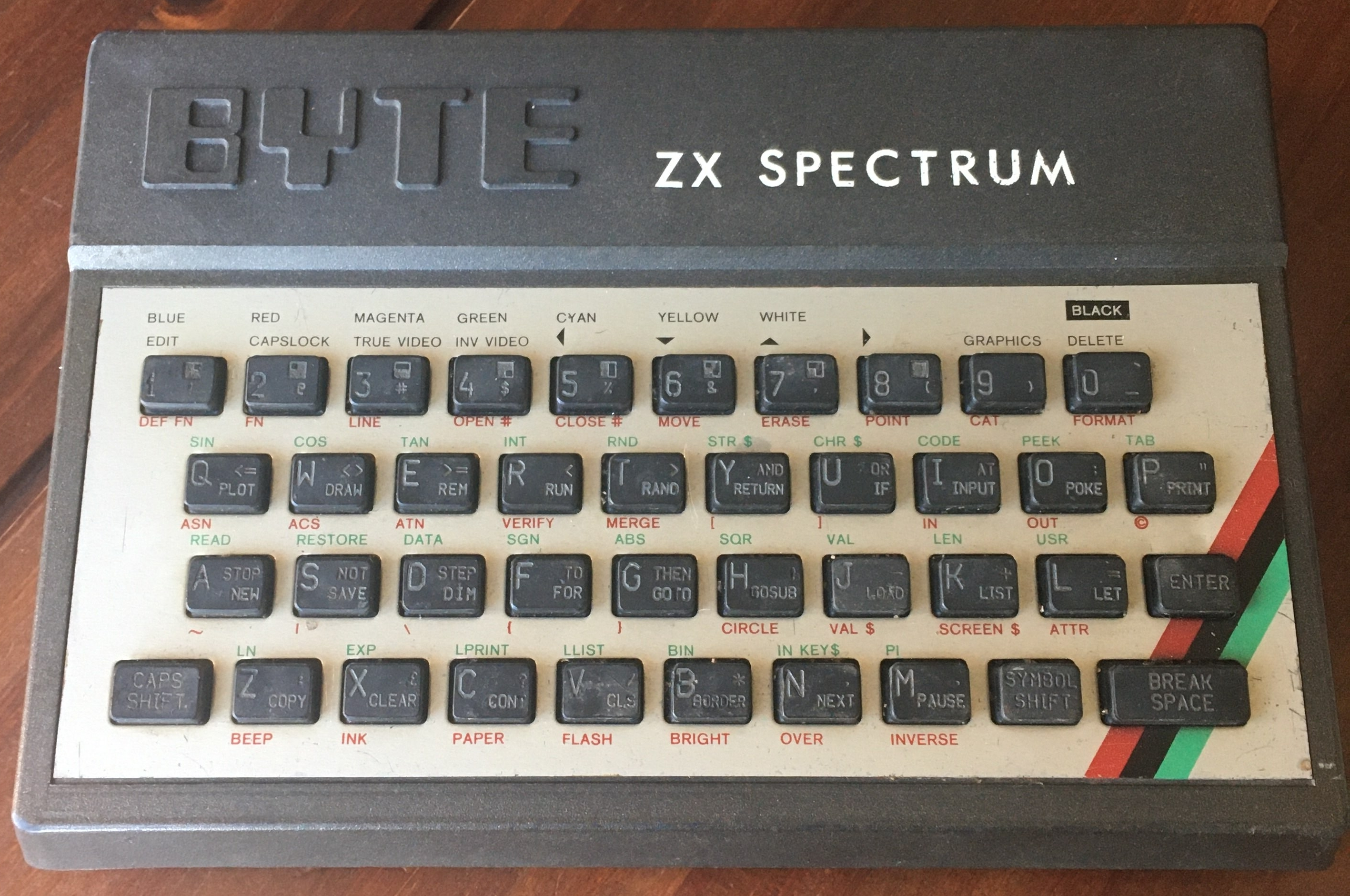
This is the Soviet ZX Spectrum known as a Byte. this "Byte" is from 1990

Byte (ru: Байт) was a Soviet clone made in Brest by the Brest Electromechanical Plant. Introduced in 1989, it used several Z80 CPU clones like the KR1858VM1, KR1858VM1 or T34VM1. Specifications are similar to the original Spectrum, with 48 KB or RAM. In 1992 an average of 1,705 computers were produced per month. Production ended in 1995.

==== BASIC and Breeze ====
These machines were produced at the Vladivostok plant Radiopribor, based on South Korean microchips. They were sold in suitcase with a cassette containing programs and games. BASIC (ru: Бейсик) came with 48 KB of RAM, while the Breeze (ru: Бриз) was a 128 KB machine with a printer controller, disk drive and a sound chip.

==== Composite ====
The Composite (ru: Композит) was a Russian clone of the ZX Spectrum introduced in 1993 by NTK (ru: НТК), with 48 KB RAM. It is a modified version of Leningrad 2, produced by the Composite co-op.

==== Dubna 48K ====
Dubna 48K (ru: Дубна 48К) was a 1991 Soviet clone of the ZX Spectrum home computer, named after the town of Dubna, where it was produced. It used Zilog Z80 processor clone.

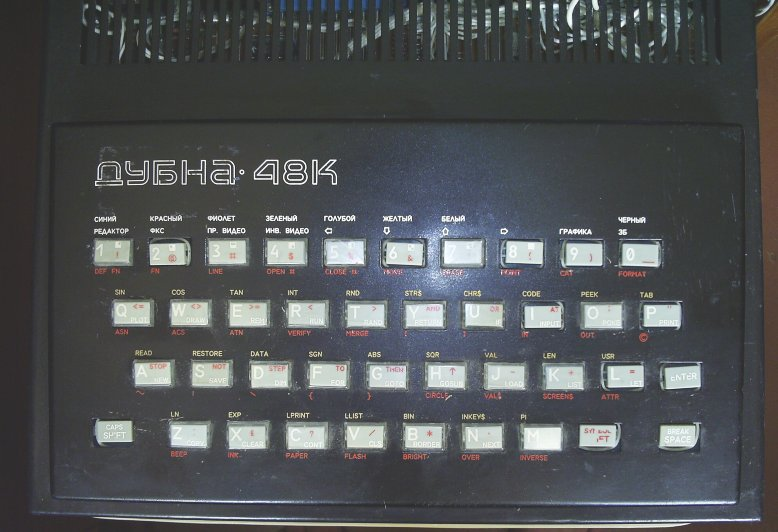
Dubna 48K

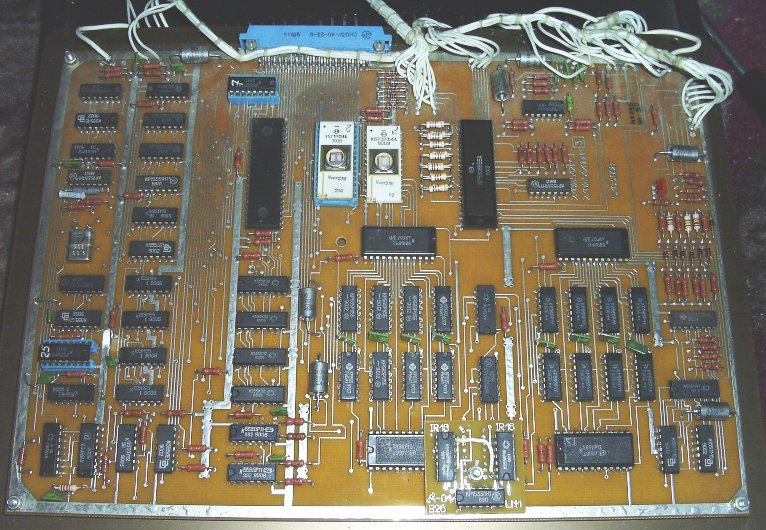
Dubna 48K mainboard

==== Duet ====
The Duet (ru: Дуэт) was a ZX Spectrum 48K clone produced at the Lianozovsky Electromechanical Plant (LEMZ, Moscow).

==== Ella Ra ====
The Ella Ra, Also known as the Elara-Disk 128, this was a Russian clone, made in 1991, of the ZX Spectrum 128K. It featured a 58-key keyboard, floppy disk drive, and ports for both Kempston and Sinclair joysticks. Whilst it is possible to expand the system, incompatibilities may arise due to some of the ports having been changed.

==== GrandRomMax ====
The GrandRomMax was a Russian clone of the ZX Spectrum made in Moscow in 1993. It is very similar to the Pentagon, but was designed to be more like the original ZX Spectrum. Several variations exist of the system, with only minor differences between them. One version has an improperly configured Beta Disk Interface, resulting in all information on the disk being destroyed when an attempt to write to it is made on a different machine.

The GrandRomMax is not easy to expand because some of its PL/M chips do not support the signals required for sending and receiving data to and from certain peripherals.

==== Grandboard 2+ ====
Grandboard 2+ was a Russian clone of the ZX Spectrum, based on the GrandRomMax GRM2+ board. It was developed and manufactured in 1994 by the Independent Science-Manufacturing Laboratory of Computer Techniques in Fryazino.

- CPU: Z-80 NEC (8-bit)
- Clock frequency: 3.45 MHz
- RAM: 128 KB
- Text: 24 × 32, eight possible colours
- Graphics: 256 × 192, eight possible colours
- Sound processor: AY-8910m (YM 2149F)
- Dimensions: 350 × 280 × 35 mm (13.2 × 8.4 × 2 inches)

==== Gamma ====
The Gamma (ru: Гамма) was a ZX Spectrum 48K clone produced by OKB Processor, Voronezh, in the late 1980s. The ROM was changed from the original machine, with lowercase Latin characters replaced by Cyrillic and Sinclair BASIC messages translated into Russian.

==== Hobbit ====
Hobbit (ru: Хоббит) was a Soviet/Russian 8-bit home computer, based on the Sinclair Research ZX Spectrum hardware architecture. It also featured a CP/M mode, and Forth mode or LOGO mode, with the Forth or LOGO operating environment residing in an on-board ROM chip.

==== Impulse ====
Impulse (ru: Импульс) series was built by the RIP plant in Krasnodar. The keyboard had Cyrillic characters and the ROM was modified. The Impulse-M model featured a built-in SECAM encoder for connecting the computer to a TV.

==== Iskra-1085 ====
The Iskra-1085 (ru: Искра 1085) was a ZX Spectrum 48K clone with 64K of RAM. Developed in the second half of the 1980s, it was produced by Schetmash in Kursk. The computer had a built-in power supply.

==== Julduz ====
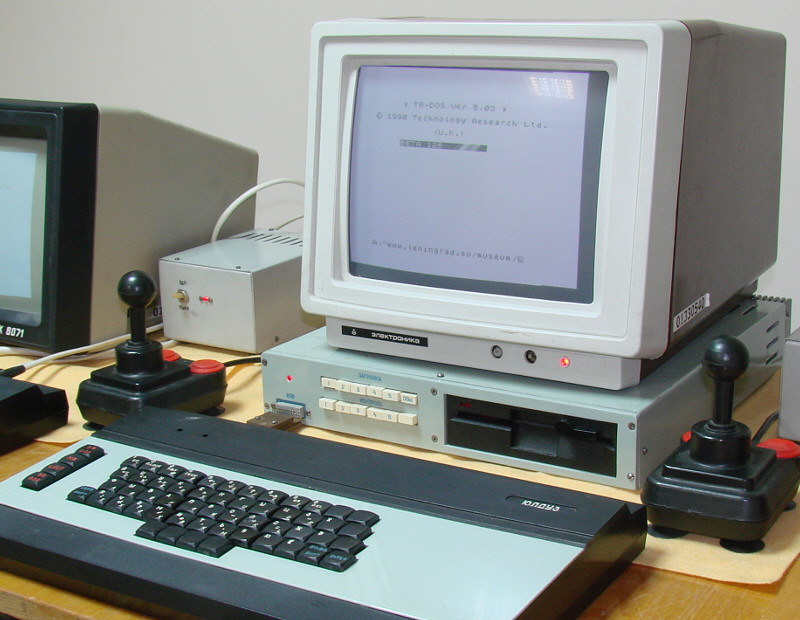
Soviet made school personal computer "Julduz" (Azerbajdzan lang., mean "Star")

The Julduz (Yulduz; Юлдуз, meaning "star" in Azerbaijani) was a ZX Spectrum clone aimed at schools, with 64 KB of RAM.

==== Kay 1024 ====
The Kay 1024 was a Russian clone of the ZX Spectrum, released by NEMO in 1998. It was intended to rival the popular Scorpion ZS 256, and had a slightly lower price despite carrying far more onboard RAM (1024 KB). It features a controller for a standard PC keyboard, as well as an HDD, but not for FDDs; support for these was available via an expansion card. The CPU has a turbo mode, enabling it to run at 10 MHz.

==== Krasnogorsk ====
The Krasnogorsk (ru: Красного́рск) was a Russian clone of the ZX Spectrum, named after the city in which it was built (Krasnogorsk). It was developed and manufactured in 1991, but not produced in the same quantities as the Leningrad 1.

==== Kvorum ====
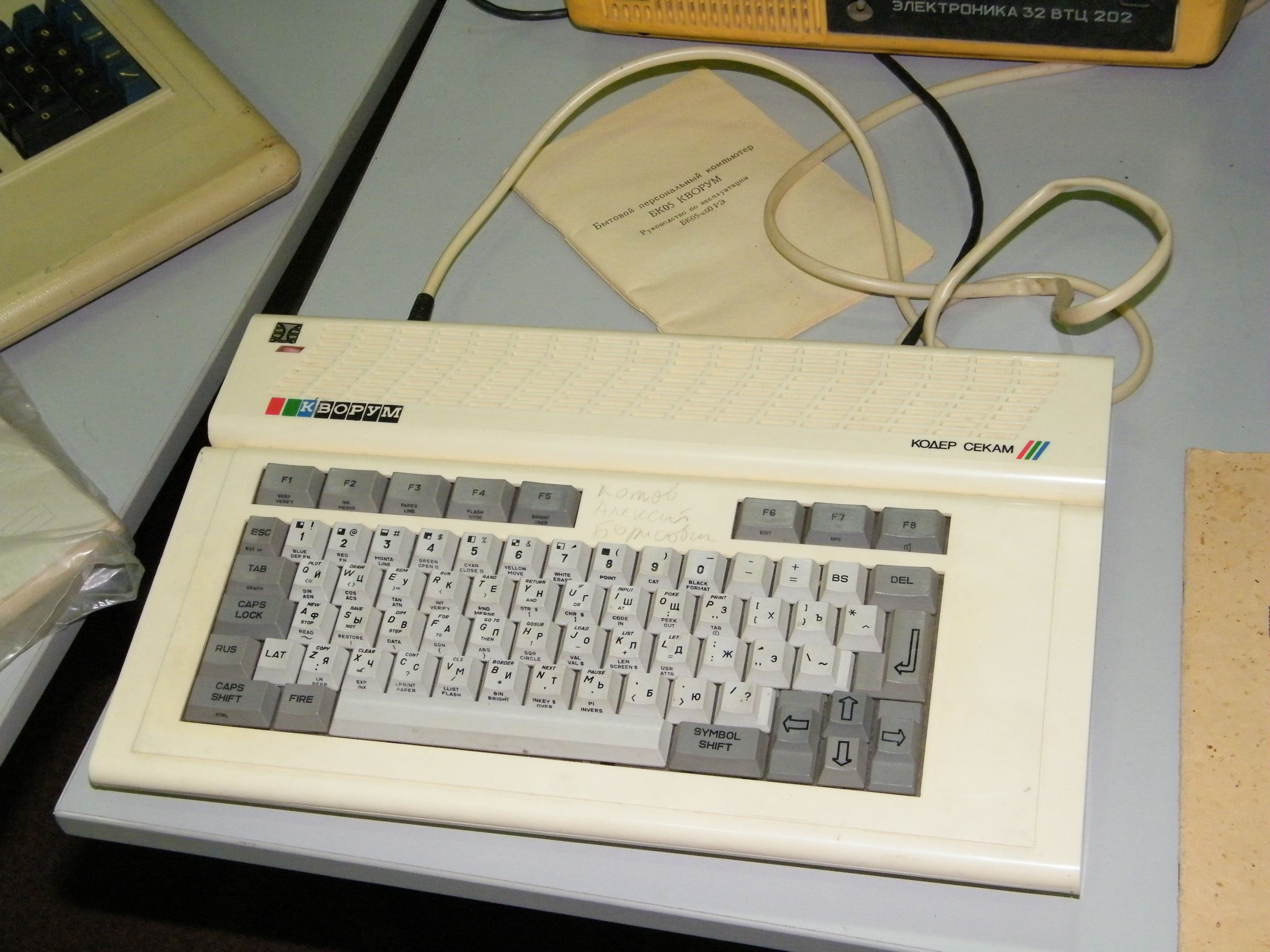
Kvorum

The Kvorum (ru: КВОРУМ) were a series of Russian ZX Spectrum clones with three different RAM options: 48 KB (Kvorum 48); 64 KB (Kvorum 64); 128 KB (Kvorum 128). The Kvorum 128 featured built-in tests, a memory monitor, and the possibility of copying in ROM. It also had the option of running CP/M and TR-DOS (via Beta Disk).

The Kvorum 128+ had the same features as the Kvorum 128, but included a built-in 3.5″ drive.

==== Leningrad ====
Leningrad is a series of Soviet clones of the ZX Spectrum.The Leningrad 1 was released in 1988, and was a clone of the 48K – it became the cheapest out of all the mass-made clones. They computer was designed to be as simple as possible, and more compact than the other clones which were available at the time. It was designed by Sergey Zonov, who later went on and created the Scorpion. The Leningrad 2 was released in 1991. The joystick port was changed to one which was Kempston-compatible, and the keyboard was much improved. It sold in great numbers.

==== Master ====
The Master (ru: MACTEP) was a Soviet clone of the ZX Spectrum made in 1990. It ran at 2.5 MHz with 48 KB RAM, and It had ports for both Sinclair and Kempston joysticks.

==== Master K ====
Master K is a Russian clone of the ZX Spectrum made in Ivanovo in 1991. It featured 48 KB RAM, 16 KB ROM, and a Kempston joystick interface. The dimensions of the system unit are 14 × 8 × 2 1/2 inches (355.6 × 203.2 × 63.5 mm), and its weight is approximately 1 1/2 kg (3.307 lbs).

==== Magic 05 ====
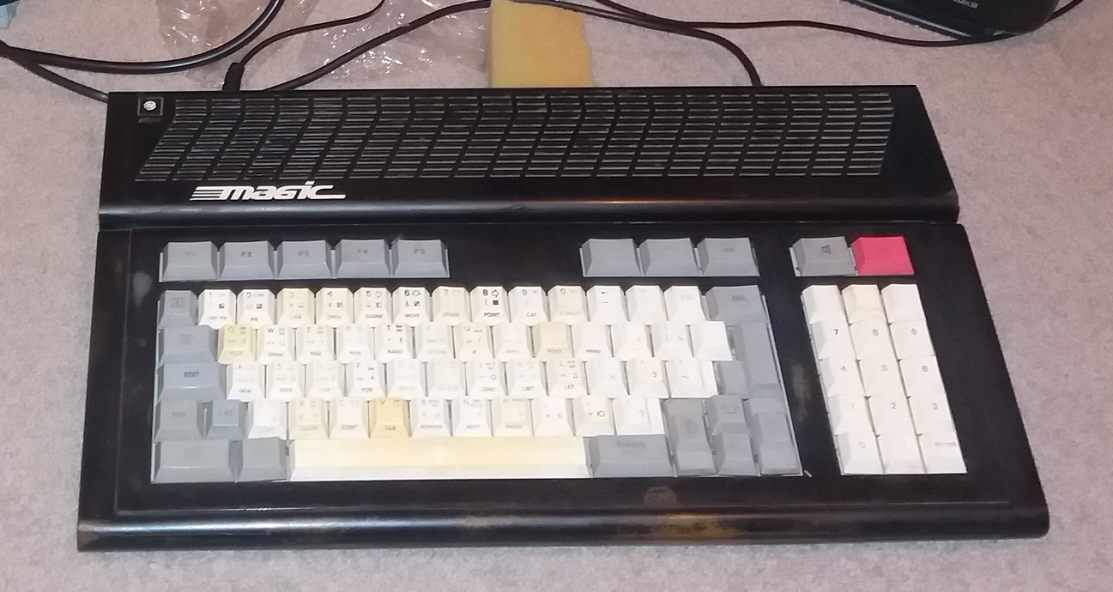
Magic 05

Magic-05 or Магик-05 is a home computer, based on Soviet components. Various models were developed and produced by the UOMZ and Vector plants (Ekaterinburg).

==== Moskva ====
Moskva (ru: Москва, en: Moscow) was the name of two Soviet ZX Spectrum clones. Introduced in 1988, the Moskva 48K was the first mass-produced clone of the 48K Spectrum in the USSR. One year later, the Moskva 128K was launched, and was a faithful clone of the ZX Spectrum 128K, featuring a built-in printer interface, joystick and TV/RGB ports, but lacked a sound processor and disk drive.

==== Nafanja ====
Nafanja (ru: НАФАНЯ) was a Soviet ZX Spectrum clone from 1990, which was designed to be transported in a case. It was made for diplomats and children. It is compatible with Dubna 48K, and has a joystick port. At the time of launch, its price was 650 roubles.

==== Parus VI-201 ====
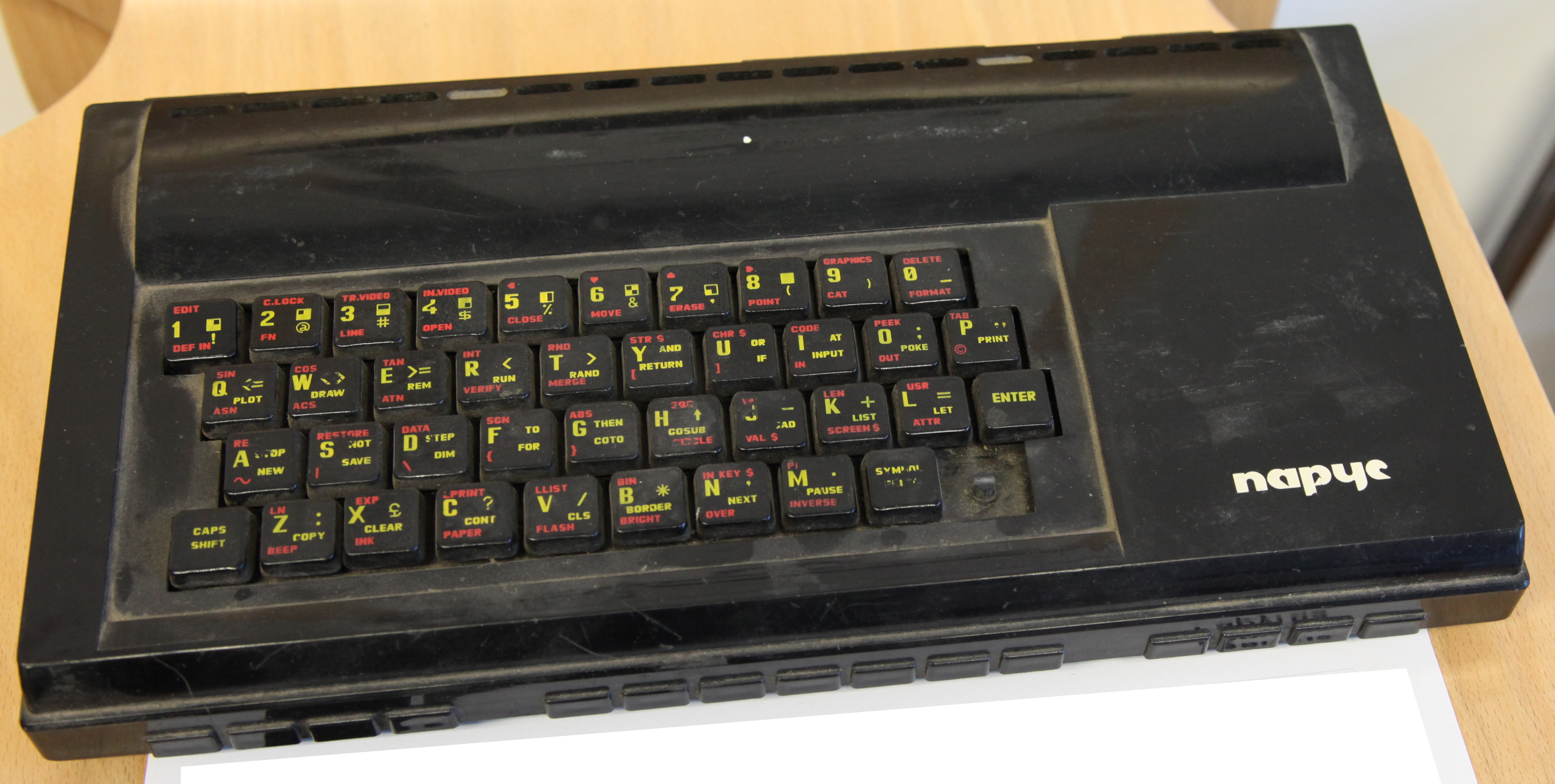
Парус ВИ201 (Parus VI201)

The Parus VI-201 (ru: Парус ВИ-201) was a Russian ZX Spectrum clone from 1992, designed for use as a video game console; ВИ (VI) stood for видео игра (video game). It was equipped with a Zilog Z80 processor, RF modulator, plus several DIN connectors for use with Kempston joysticks and an external cassette recorder.

==== Orel BK-08 ====
The Orel BK-08 (ru: Орель БК-08) was a Ukrainian ZX Spectrum clone from 1991 which featured 64 KB non-separate fast RAM, an NMI button, an extended keyboard with Cyrillic characters in the upper address of ROM, two Sinclair joystick ports, and one Kempston in both connectors (DIN connectors). The video signal is output via SRGB, rather than an RF modulator. Memory access is clear (there is no conflict with the CPU and display controller) and display timing is the same as in the original ZX Spectrum.

==== Pentagon ====
The Pentagon (ru: Пентагон) home computer was a clone of the British-made Sinclair ZX Spectrum 128. It was manufactured by amateurs in the former Soviet Union, following freely distributable documentation. Its PCB was copied all over the ex-USSR in 1991-1996, which made it a widespread ZX Spectrum clone. The name "Pentagon" derives from the shape of the original PCB (Pentagon 48), with a diagonal cut in one of the corners.

==== Peters MC64 and MD-256S3 ====
The Peters MC64 was a Russian ZX Spectrum clone from around 1993, made by Peters Plus, Ltd., who went on to make the Sprinter. Its dimensions are 14 × 7.2 × 2 inches (355.6 × 182.88 × 50.8 mm). The Peters MD-256S3 is an enhanced version of the MC64.

==== Profi ====
The Profi or ZX-Profi is a Soviet ZX Spectrum clone developed in 1991 in Moscow by Kondor and Kramis. It features a 7 MHz Zilog Z80 CPU, up to 1024 KB RAM, 64 KB ROM, AY8910 sound chip, Beta 128 disk interface, IDE interface, and 512 × 240 multi-colour (i.e. two possible colours per 8 × 1 block) graphics mode for CP/M. Users liked to plug in two 8-bit DACs to play 4-channel modules of Scream Tracker. It also has both parallel and serial ports, and the possibility of attaching an IBM keyboard.

==== Robik ====
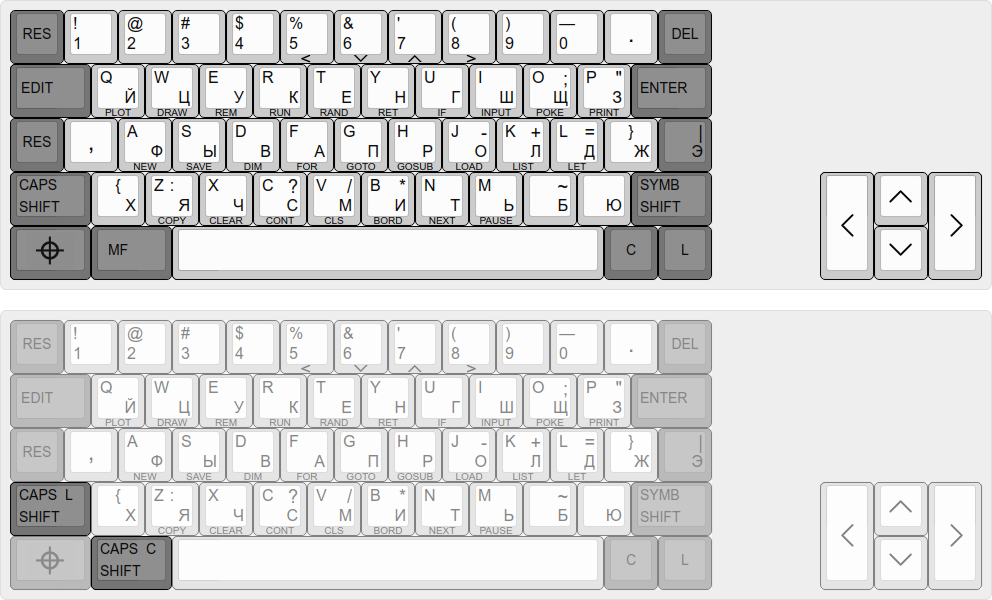
Robik keyboard layouts

ALU Robik (Russian: Арифметико-Логическое Устройство «Робик», lit. 'Arithmetic Logic Unit «Robik»') was a Soviet and Ukrainian ZX Spectrum clone produced between 1989 and 1998 by NPO "Rotor" in Cherkasy (Ukraine).

==== Santaka 002 ====
A ZX Spectrum+ clone produced in 1990 in Kaunas (as mentioned on the computer startup screen), then on the Lithuanian SSR. Its keyboard features Cyrillic characters rather than Latin ones.

==== Scorpion ZS-256 ====
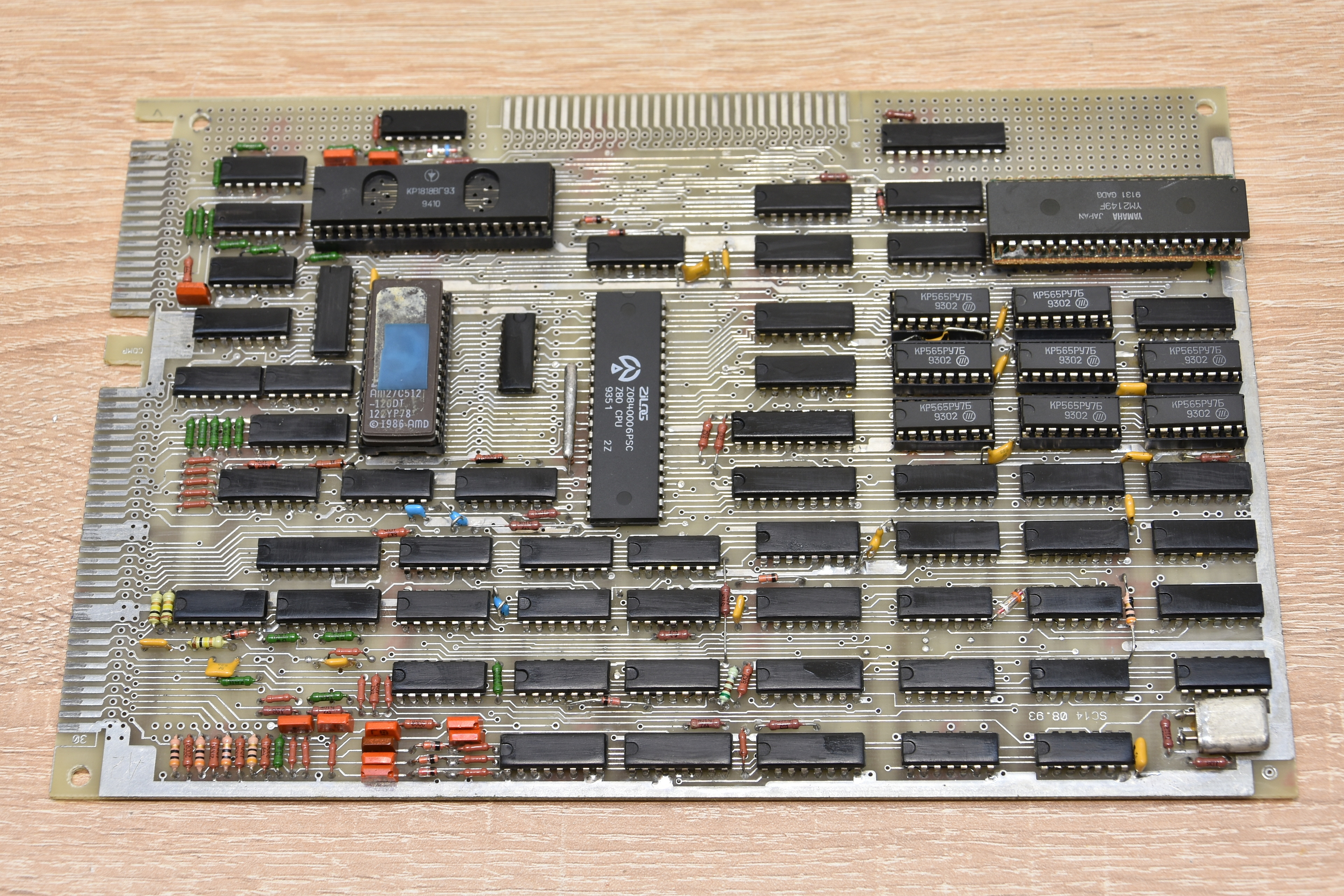
Scorpion ZS-256 Turbo mainboard

The Scorpion ZS-256 (ru: Скорпион ЗС-256) was a very widespread ZX Spectrum clone produced in St. Petersburg by Sergey Zonov. It was fitted with a Zilog Z80 processor, whilst memory options ranged from 256 to 1024 KB. Various expansions were produced, including SMUC: an adapter for IDE and ISA slots, which allowed the use of IBM PC compatible hard drives and expansion cards. The Shadow Service Monitor (debugger) in the BASIC ROM was activated by pressing the Magic Button (NMI). There was also the option of fitting the machine with a ProfROM which included such software as a clock, hard disk utilities and the ZX-Word text editor.

==== Sever 48/002 ====
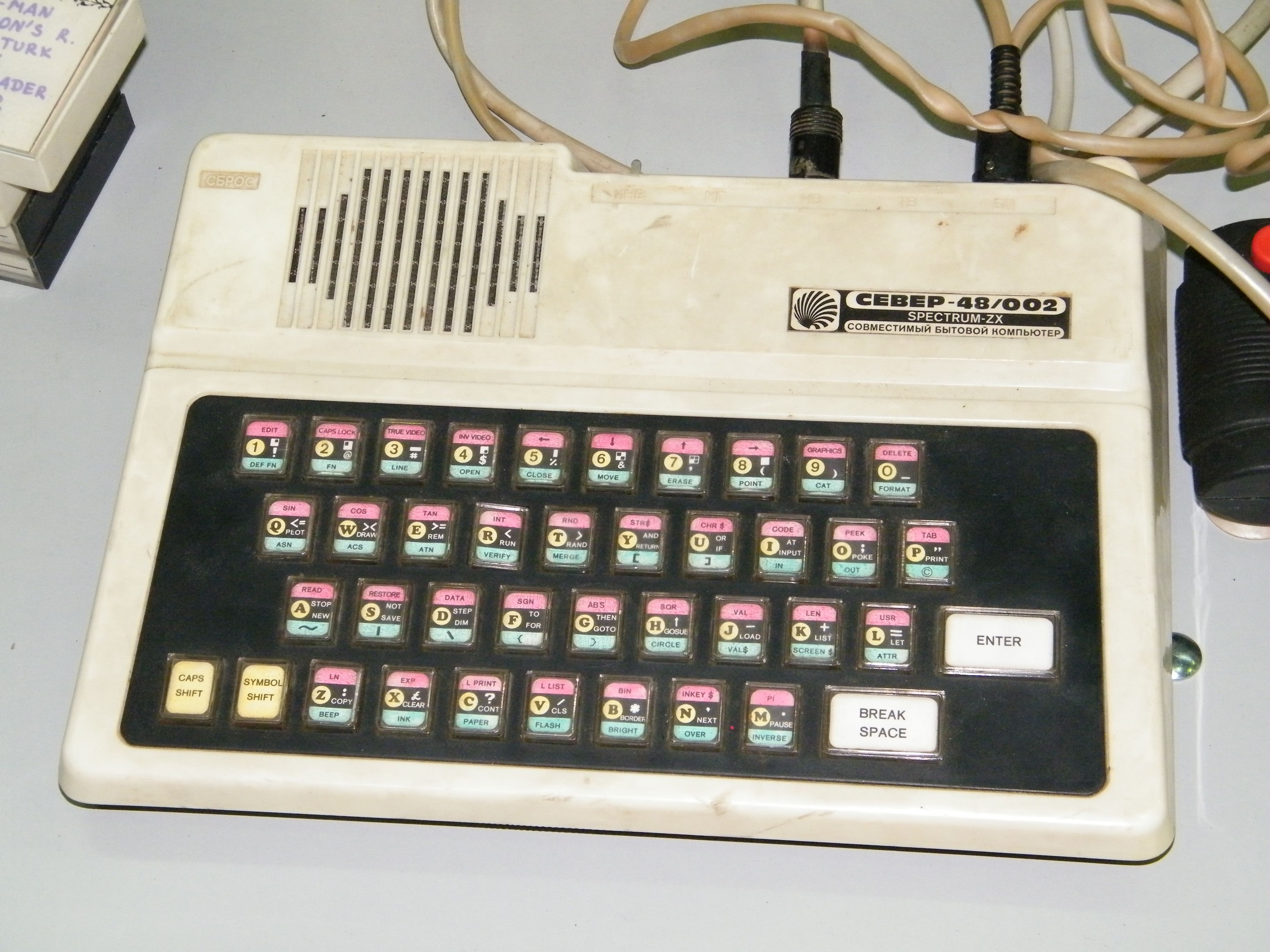
Sever (Север) 48/002

Sever 48/002 (ru: Север 48/002) was a Soviet ZX Spectrum clone from 1990, whose name means 'North' (Север). It had 64 KB of RAM, and a 16 KB ROM. The dimensions of the system unit are 12 × 8 × 2 1/2 inches (304.8 × 203.2 × 63.5 mm), and its weight is 1 1/2 kg (3.307 lbs).

==== Sintez and -Sintez- ====
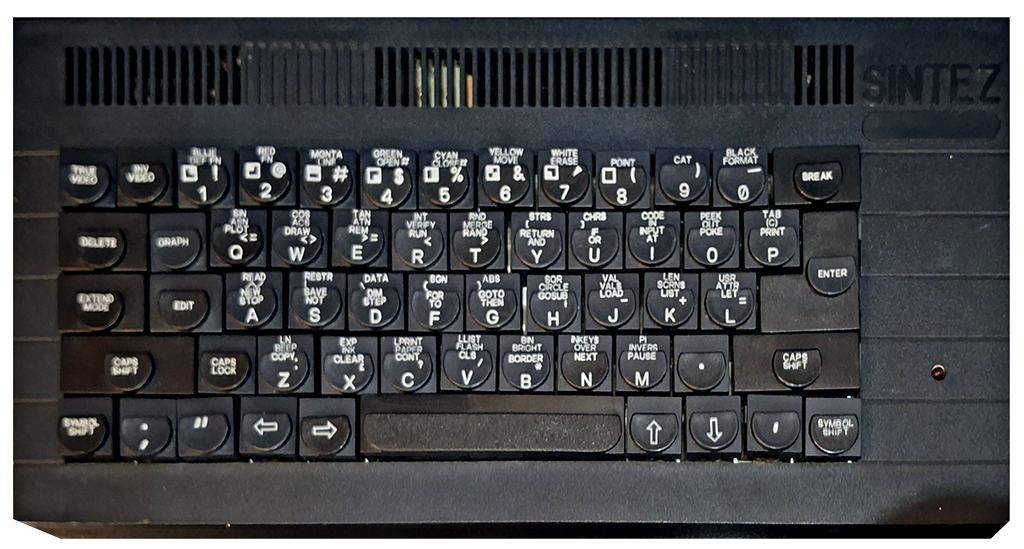
SINTEZ

The Sintez and -Sintez- are Soviet clones of the ZX Spectrum developed in the "Signal" factory (НПО «Сигнал») within the Moldovan SSR in 1989. The original Sintez resembled the Spectrum+ model, while the -Sintez- was an improved version with a more common mechanical keyboard, an additional serial port, as well as the provision for an 8080 or related processor (e.g. 8255) to be added and used together with the UA 880. Whilst it is largely compatible with software for the ZX Spectrum 48K (and has two Interface 2 joystick ports) its hardware is configured differently from the machine it is based on, utilising a different memory chip set-up, and lacking slowdown when accessing certain areas of memory, with the result that certain applications and games may produce unexpected results, or crash altogether.

==== Spektr 48 ====
Spektr 48 (ru: Срektр 48) was a Russian clone of the 48K ZX Spectrum, produced in 1991 by Oryol (Орёл). It used a membrane keyboard which featured both Latin and Cyrillic letters, and came with a monitor program in ROM.

==== Symbol ====
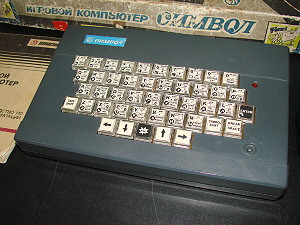
Soviet computer SYMBOL

The Symbol (ru: Симбол) was a Russian clone of the ZX Spectrum, produced by JSC "Radiozavod" in Penza from 1990 to 1995.

==== Vega ====
The Vega-64 and Vega-128 were produced in Odesa by the VPO Prometheus from 1990 to 1991. It was used a school computer, and supported both Cyrillic and Latin character sets.

==== Vesta ====
Vesta (ru: Веста) was a series of machines produced by the Stavropol radio plant Signal. The Vesta IK-30 is a ZX Spectrum 48K clone with a 40-button keyboard, external power supply and a joystick. Vesta IK-30M and Vesta IK-31 are more modern models.

==== Vostok ====
The Vostok was a ZX Spectrum 48K clone, produced by the Izhevsk Radio Plant. It came with a Kempston joystick interface and a built-in tape recorder.

==== ZX Next ====
ZX Next is a Russian ZX Spectrum clone with two Z80 processors (one serving as a video processor). It features an RS-232 port, turbo mode, IBM keyboard, 10 Mbit/s local network interface, and a CGA graphics mode with 640×200 pixel resolution. Its RAM is expandable to 512 KB. The machine also goes by the names ZX-Forum 2 and ZX Frium2. Not to be confused with the Sinclair ZX Spectrum Next released in 2017.

==== ZXM series ====
This is a series of Russian ZX Spectrum clones designed by Mick Laboratory.

The ZXM-777 was developed in 2006, and uses a TMPZ84C00-8 CPU at 3.5 MHz in normal mode, or 7.0 MHz in turbo mode. It features 128 KB of RAM, a YM2149F sound chip, a floppy disk controller, and can TR-DOS, BASIC 128, or ASIC 48.

The ZXM-Phoenix was introduced in 2008, and uses a KR1858VM1 (Z80A clone) CPU running at 3.5 MHz, or a TMPZ84C00-8 running at 3.5 MHz in normal mode, or 7.0 MHz in turbo mode. It has 1024/2048 KB of RAM, floppy and hard drive controllers, and features mouse support.

The ZXM-Alcyon was developed in late 2015, and is based on the transformation of an Igrosoft slot machine board (which uses a Zilog Z80 microprocessor) into a ZX Spectrum compatible machine.

The ZXM-Jasper was developed in 2016, and is also based on the Igrosoft board, but its goal was to be a Pentagon-compatible machine

The ZXM-Zephyr is a 2013 development, based on the ZXM-Phoenix. It is Spectrum compatible, and adds a USB connection, and an SD card reader.

=== Other ===
==== AZX-Monstrum ====
The AZX-Monstrum is a proposal for a vastly modernised ZX Spectrum compatible computer. The CPU is a Zilog Z380 (a 32-bit version of the Z80, capable of running at 40 MHz), it has its own graphic adapter, AT-keyboard, own BIOS and extended BASIC-ROM, and RAM expandable up to 4 GB linear. The computer is supposed to be almost 100% compatible. Standard devices of are HDD-controller, DMA vs IRQ controller, ROM-Task Switching, and more. So far only the HDD-controller has been produced, but the rest exists as drawings. All the plans are freely available.

==== Just Speccy ====
A ZX Spectrum clone made by Zaxxon.

==== Speccybob ====
The SpeccyBob is a ZX Spectrum clone built entirely around standard 74HC TTL chips and a programmable EPROM.

==== ZX Spectrum SE ====
The ZX Spectrum SE is a proposal for an advanced Spectrum machine, based on the Timex TC 2048 and the ZX Spectrum 128, with Timex graphic modes, and 280K RAM., made by Andrew Owen and Jarek Adamski in 2000. A prototype was created, and this configuration is supported by different emulators.

==== ZX Chloe 140SE and 280SE ====
A planned production models of the ZX Spectrum SE are the Chloe 140SE and Chloe 280SE. It subsequently became an FPGA project not directly related to the ZX Spectrum., adds a graphics mode with 320 points (instead of 256) per width and uses a dialect of Microsoft BASIC.

==== ZX128u+ ====
The ZX128u+ is a Spanish clone with the ULAplus display support, using an emulated DivMMC interface as mass storage. The board is based on the Harlequin clone and contains aZ80 processor and AY chip.

=== PLD-based clones ===
These machines are based on programmable logic devices (PLDs) – electronic components used to build reconfigurable digital circuits.

==== Buryak ====
A ZX Spectrum compatible computer with a real Z80 cpu, VGA, Turbosound, PS/2 keyboard, Kempston joystick, customized for Raspberry Pi 3B case.

==== Centoventotto ====
A ZX Spectrum clone made by Mario Pratto in 2022.

==== Chrome and Chrome 128 ====
Chrome and Chrome 128 are Spectrum clones featuring a 7 MHz Zilog Z80 CPU, 160+64 RAM, PlusD floppy disk interface, AY sound chip, and an RGB SCART port.

==== eLeMeNt ZX ====
The eLeMeNt ZX was developed by Jan Kučera (a.k.a. LMN128) in 2020, based on a lot of experience from developments of the universal FPGA interface named MB03+. It is the first (and only, as of 2022) clone with 100% hardware and display timings aligned with a digital video and sound output (incl. HDMI). It uses a genuine (faster) Z80 CPU switchable from 3.5 MHz up to 20 MHz, which can be overclocked to 30 MHz, or changed for a T80 core at higher speed. Other logic circuitry is integrated in the Alchitry AU and AU+ FPGA modules, attachable to the eLeMeNt's motherboard.

The eLeMeNt ZX combines 48K, 128K, +2, +2A, and many Russian memory models, including four Pentagon (computer) and several other Russian models, and the most popular interfaces, such as: K-Mouse; TurboSound FM; Sound Interface Device (SID); enhanced Covox and Soundrive; DivMMC; Z-Controller; Timex and advanced HiRes 512×192 with attributes and planar-based and chunky HGFX graphics modes; ULA+ and indexed true colour palettes; USB mouse and keyboard; 2 interchangeable SD card slots; 3 joystick slots, supporting 2-button Kempston and 8-button Sega controllers; USB serial connection with PC through a standard USB-A cable. The eLeMeNt features the original ZX bus (1x external, 2x internal), a USB-A serial connection and a rich internal pinout expansion for other modern peripherals.

The eLeMeNt has 2 MB of RAM, which is upgradeable to 4 MB. The ROM system supports 16K to 64 KB ROMs, plus SetUp (BIOS) ROM, Rescue ROM, and the latest version of the modern FAT and POSIX-API based filesystem: esxDOS.

==== Humble 48 ====
A spanish clone, introduced in 2017.

==== Karabas 128, Pro ====
The Karabas-128 is a ZX Spectrum 128k clone developed by Andy Karpov, based on CPLD Altera EPM7128STC100. The Karabas Pro is FPGA based clone with FDD and HDD controllers.

==== N-Go ====
A clone of the ZX Spectrum Next.

==== SAM Coupé ====
SAM Coupé was an advanced 8-bit computer from 1989, compatible with the ZX Spectrum 48K. The design of the disk-drive hardware was based on the MG PlusD interface. SAM BASIC was very similar to the BetaBasic, and was developed by the same author. The Coupé was considered the successor to the ZX Spectrum in the late '80s.

==== Sizif ====
The Sizif is a ZX Spectrum CPLD-based clone for rubber case, developed by Eugene Lozovoy.

==== Speccy 2010 ====
The Speccy2010 is FPGA development board by Martin Bórik, built for the implementation of various gaming computers, originally focused on ZX Spectrum and its clones.

==== Superfo (ZX mini, ZX Max, ZX Spider, ZX Nuvo) ====
These are ZX Spectrum clones by Don "Superfo".

==== ZX Badaloc ====
ZX Badaloc was the very first CPLD/FPGA advanced ZX Spectrum clone.

==== ZX Chloe 280SE ====
Based on the ZX Spectrum SE (128K model + Timex), could be seen as a continuation of the ZX-Uno.

==== ZX-Evolution (Ts-Conf and Baseconf) ====
A Spectrum-compatible computer with improved hardware specifications and using modern peripherals. In addition to the basic core (Baseconf), it also has extended core named TS-Conf, which supports sprites, other extended video modes and have original memory manager.

==== ZX Prism ====
The ZX Prism is a proposal for a modern ZX Spectrum clone.

==== ZX-Uno(+) ====
The ZX-Uno is based on a FPGA board focused on replicating ZX Spectrum computer models. It has a similar size to the Raspberry Pi and fit into a RasPi case.

=== Multi-platform computers with ZX-Spectrum core ===
==== DivGMX ====
A ZX Spectrum interface that can also work as a standalone computer.

==== ReVerSE ====
Several projects by mvvproject.

==== ZX DOS+ ====
ZXDOS is the continuation of the ZX-Uno project. A 1 MB version of the ZXDOS was released in 2020 that is compatible with the SpecNext core.

==== ZX Tres ====
ZXTres is an evolution of ZXDOS and ZX-Uno, based on the QMTECH Artix7 Xilinx board.
