= Varix VC 50 =

8-bit home computer produced in Brazil

VC 50
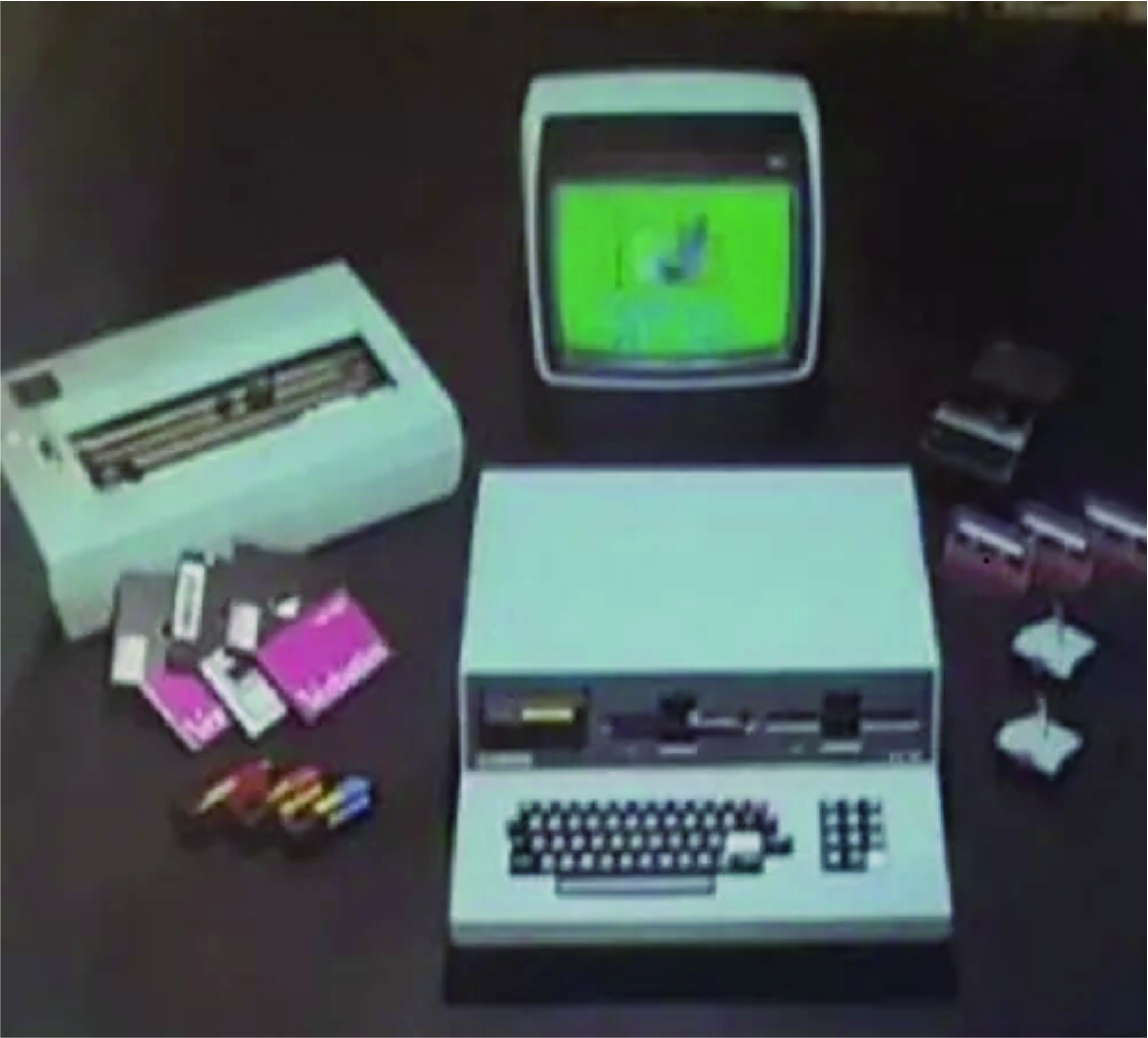
- Varix VC 50
- Manufacturer: Engetécnica/Varix
- Released: 1983; 43 years ago
- Lifespan: 1985; 41 years ago
- Units sold: 500 to 1000
- Operating system: Varix BASIC
- CPU: 6809E @ 0.895 / 1.79 MHz
- Memory: 64 KB
- Display: Composite monitor, PAL-M TV
- Graphics: MC6847 video display generator
- Sound: 6-bit DAC
- Backward compatibility: TRS-80 Color Computer

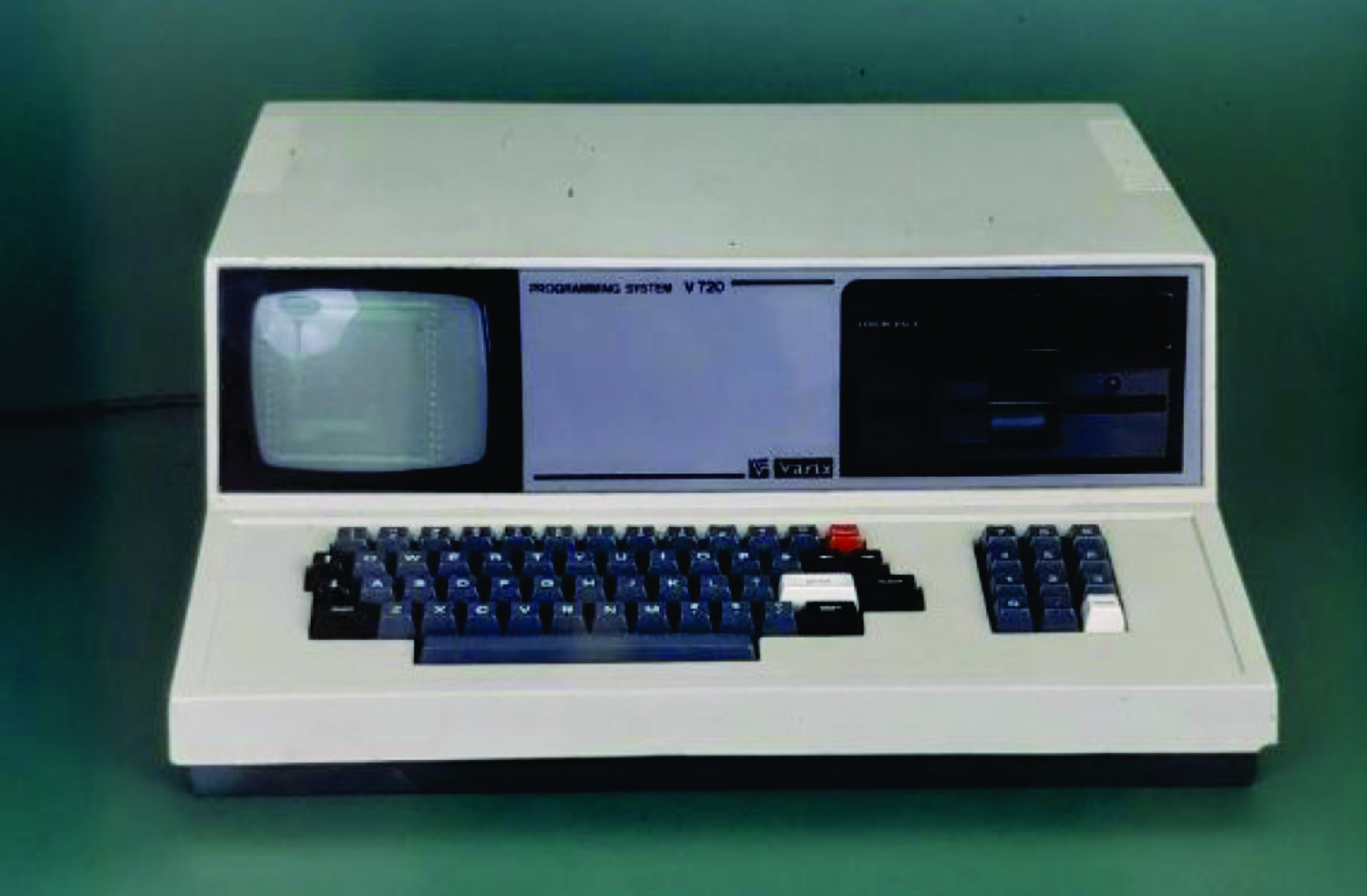
VC 50 with integrated monitor

The VC 50 was an 8-bit home computer produced in Brazil by the company Engetécnica (later called Varix) between 1983 and 1985. It was one of the many clone machines based on the TRS-80 Color Computer introduced during the Brazilian "Market Reserve", like the Codimex CD-6809 or Prológica CP 400 COLOR.

== History ==
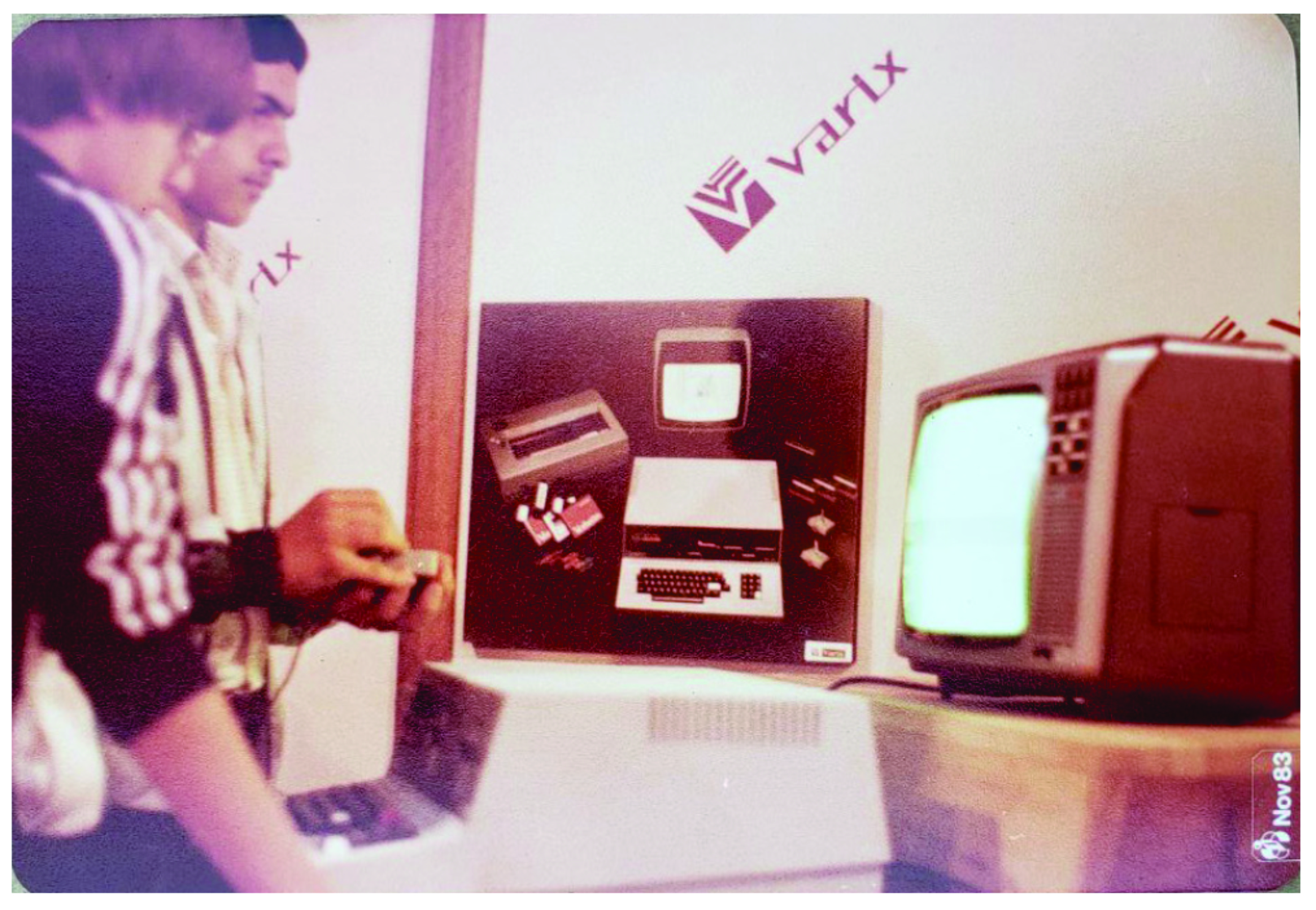
VC 50 demonstration, 1983

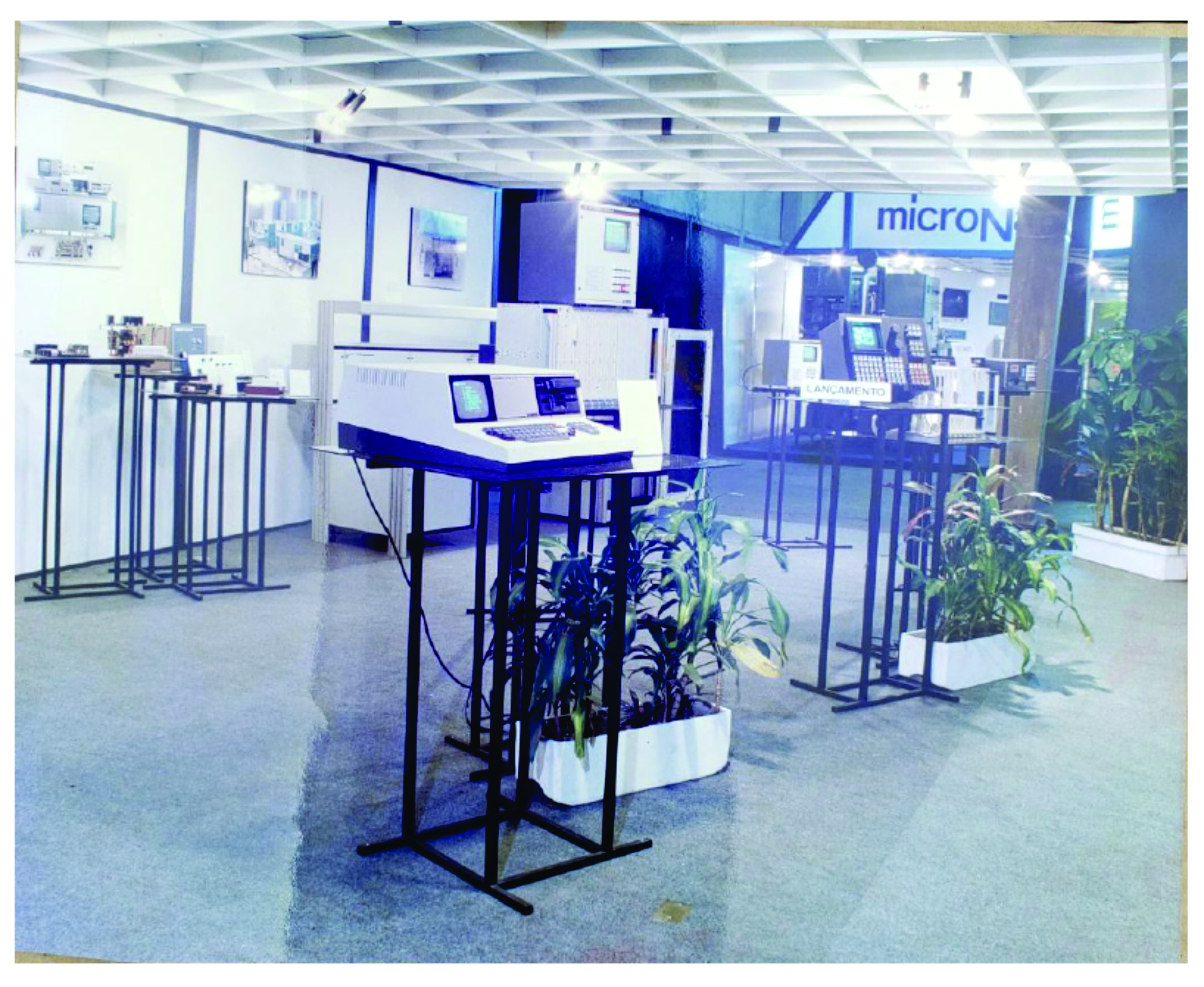
VC 50 demonstration, 1983

Launched in 1983, the initial target audience for the VC50 was mainly agricultural companies, sugar mills and distilleries. The machine, originally equipped with an integrated floppy disk drive and numeric keypad, came to be used as a controller for industrial manufacturing processes and for financial and production calculations related to agriculture. Varixx, formerly Engetécnica/Varix, developed specific software packages for these usages (including for example of sucrose content control or freight price list generation). The machine faced competition from established business machines like the CP 500 and the Sistema 700, both from Prológica, as well as Apple II compatibles, having a limited success, with 500 to 1000 units sold.

Despite intending to establish itself as a professional computer, the VC 50 also tried to compete with other Brazilian TRS-80 Color Computer clones, like the CP 400. It was not successful due to the extra cost of the integrated floppy disk drive.

== Technical features ==
The basic features of the VC 50 are similar to the TRS-80 Color Computer.

- CPU: Motorola 6809E, 890 kHz to 1.8 MHz
- Memory:
  - ROM: 16 KB (containing Varix BASIC)
  - RAM: 64 KB
- Keyboard:
  - Built-in, 52-keys plus 12-keys keypad
- Display: Motorola 6847, 9 colors
  - Text mode (with 32 × 16 characters)
  - Low resolution graphics (with 64 × 32 pixels)
  - Medium and high resolution graphics (up to 256 × 192 pixels, 2 colors per pixel)
- Expansion port (cartridges, disk interfaces, etc.)
- Built in disk drive: 180K, single-sided
- Other ports:
  - Composite video monitor (PAL-M color TV using an external modulator)
  - RS-232C serial port
  - Analogue or digital joysticks
  - Cassette recorder (1500 baud, with remote engine control)

== See also ==
- Motorola 6809
- CP 400 COLOR
- Codimex CD-6809
- LZ Color 64
- TRS-80 Color Computer
