= Dynacom MX1600 =

8-bit home computer produced in Brazil

MX-1600
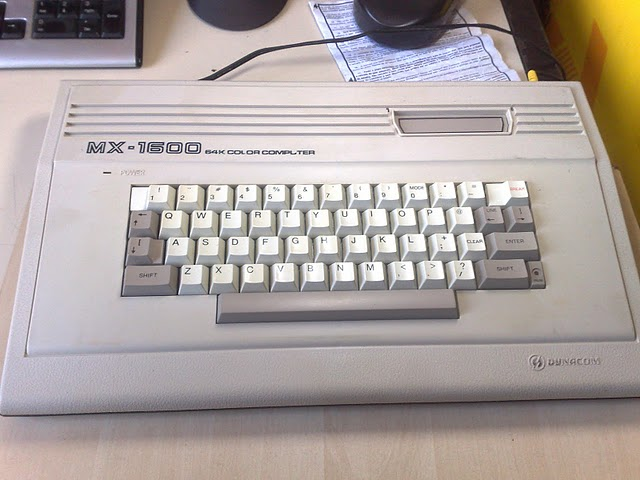
- Dynacom MX-1600
- Manufacturer: Dynacom
- Released: 1985; 41 years ago
- Discontinued: 1986; 40 years ago
- CPU: 6809E @ 0.895 / 1.79 MHz
- Memory: 64 kB
- Display: PAL-M color composite or TV RF out
- Graphics: MC6847 video display generator
- Sound: 6-bit DAC
- Backward compatibility: TRS-80 Color Computer

The MX-1600 was an 8-bit home computer produced in Brazil by the company Dynacom in 1985. It was one of the many clone machines based on the TRS-80 Color Computer introduced during the Brazilian "Market Reserve", like the Codimex CD-6809 or Prológica CP 400 COLOR.

== History ==
Launched in August 1985 by Dynacom, a Brazilian video game console manufacturer, the MX-1600 was intended to compete with 8-bit microcomputers such as the Apple II, taking advantage of the success of TRS-80 Color Computer compatibles in the market, based on the excellent sales results of the Prológica CP 400 COLOR.

To differentiate itself from competitors, the MX-1600 was sold with two cassette tapes containing more than one hundred games, applications and utilities, while its biggest opponent, the mentioned CP 400 COLOR, came with a single cassette tape containing only eight programs.

However, sales of the MX-1600 were below expectations and production was shut down in 1986. Although it had plans to launch a MSX standard computer, Dynacom decided to focus on developing IBM PC compatible machines.

The Dynacom MX-1600 can be emulated in MAME or XRoar.

== Technical features ==
The basic features of the Dynacom MX-1600 are similar to the TRS-80 Color Computer, yet there are some differences.

The cartridge slot was in the top right corner of the case, and as a result, cartridges were connected vertically, similar to video game consoles of the time. Only cartridges manufactured or licensed by Dynacom could be used, due to their physical format being different from that of other TRS-80 Color Computer compatibles.

Dynacom also changed the input / output connectors on the MX-1600, preferring not to use standard DIN connectors. This allowed the usage of hardware (ex. joysticks) already manufactured by the company for its video game consoles

- CPU: Motorola 6809E, 890 kHz / 1.79 MHz
- Memory:
  - ROM: 20 KB (containing "Extended Color BASIC" or "ECB")
  - RAM: 64 KB
- Keyboard:
  - Built-in, 59-keys
- Display: Motorola 6847, 9 colors
  - Text mode (with 32 x 16 characters)
  - Low resolution graphics (with 64 x 32 pixels)
  - Medium and high resolution graphics (up to 256 x 192 pixels, 2 colors per pixel)
- Expansion port (cartridges)
- Other ports:
  - PAL-M color composite or TV RF out
  - RS-232C serial port
  - Analogue or digital joysticks
  - Cassette recorder (1500 baud, with remote engine control)

== See also ==
- LZ Color 64
- CP 400 COLOR
- Codimex CD-6809
- TRS-80 Color Computer
