= Disk Extended Color BASIC =

- Developer: Microsoft
- Platform: Color Computer

Disk Extended Color Basic is an update to the Color BASIC interpreter for the Radio Shack/Tandy TRS-80 Color Computer series and is the default BASIC interpreter, and therefore the de facto operating system, for the Color Computer 3. The Color Computer Basic implementations are somewhat different for the versions of Basic which come with the other family of TRS-80 machines, namely Basic Levels I, II, and III. Assemblers and Pascal and C compilers are available for the different machines in the series. Modified subsets of Color Basic may be found on many of the Radio Shack PC series of pocket computers (PC-1 to PC-4 by Sharp, PC-5, PC-6 to PC-8 by Casio) of the era.

Color Basic was updated again for the Color Computer 3 and some sources refer to this fourth as Enhanced Color Basic. This version containing routines for disk management is known as Disk Extended Color BASIC. Updates to the language include routines for disk management, therefore the name. A fifth programming language for this series of computers is the Basic interpreter which runs on the Radio Shack/Tandy MC-10, a small computer marketed beginning in 1984.

Emulators of the Color Computers running this programme interpreter and the others are available for modern computers, some of which require a "snapshot" file of the physical machine.
