= TRS-80 Color Computer =

Line of home computers

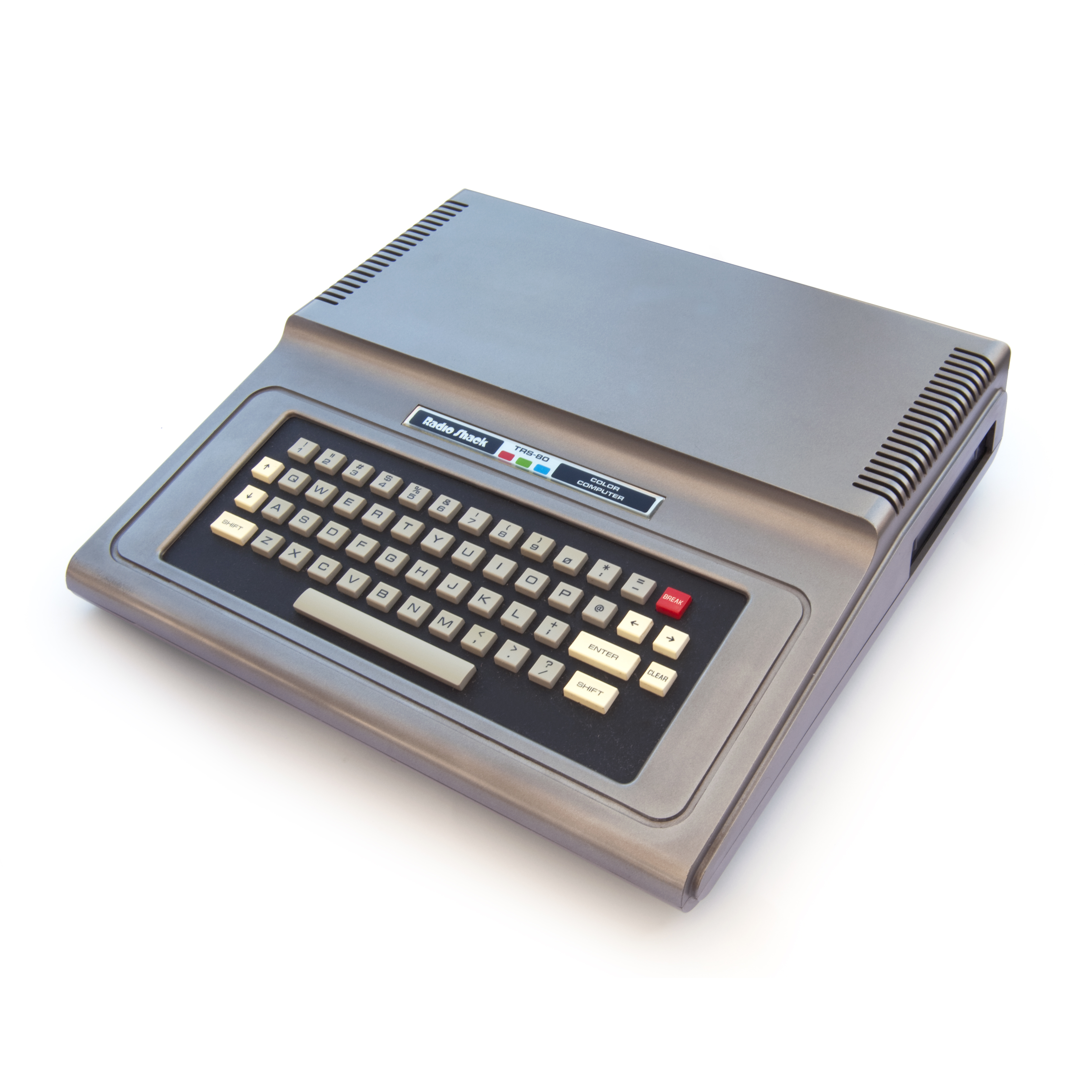
- 16K TRS-80 Color Computer
- Developer: Tandy Corporation
- Manufacturer: Motorola
- Released: September 1980; 45 years ago
- Introductory price: US$399 (equivalent to $1,560 in 2025)
- Discontinued: 1991
- Operating system: Color BASIC / OS-9
- CPU: 6809E @ 0.895 / 1.79 MHz
- Memory: 4 / 16 / 32 / 64 / 128 / 512 KB
- Graphics: MC6847 video display generator
- Sound: 6-bit DAC

The TRS-80 Color Computer, later marketed as the Tandy Color Computer, is a series of home computers developed and sold by Tandy Corporation. Despite sharing a name with the earlier, Z80-based TRS-80, the Color Computer is a different system and a radical departure in design based on the Motorola 6809E and variants of the Motorola 6847 video display generator.

The Tandy Color Computer line, nicknamed CoCo, started in 1980 with what is now called the Color Computer 1. It was available in 4K, 16K, and 32K models. The Color Computer 2 (1983) was a cost reduced version with 16K and 64K models. The Color Computer 3 (1986) was a significant upgrade, adding a software-controlled option to double the processor speed, improved graphics, 128K or 512K memory, and a memory management unit. All three models maintain a high level of software and hardware compatibility, with few programs written for an older model being unable to run on the newer ones. The Color Computer 3 was discontinued in 1991.

All Color Computer models shipped with Color BASIC, an implementation of Microsoft BASIC, in ROM. Variants of the OS-9 multitasking operating system were available from third parties.

== History ==
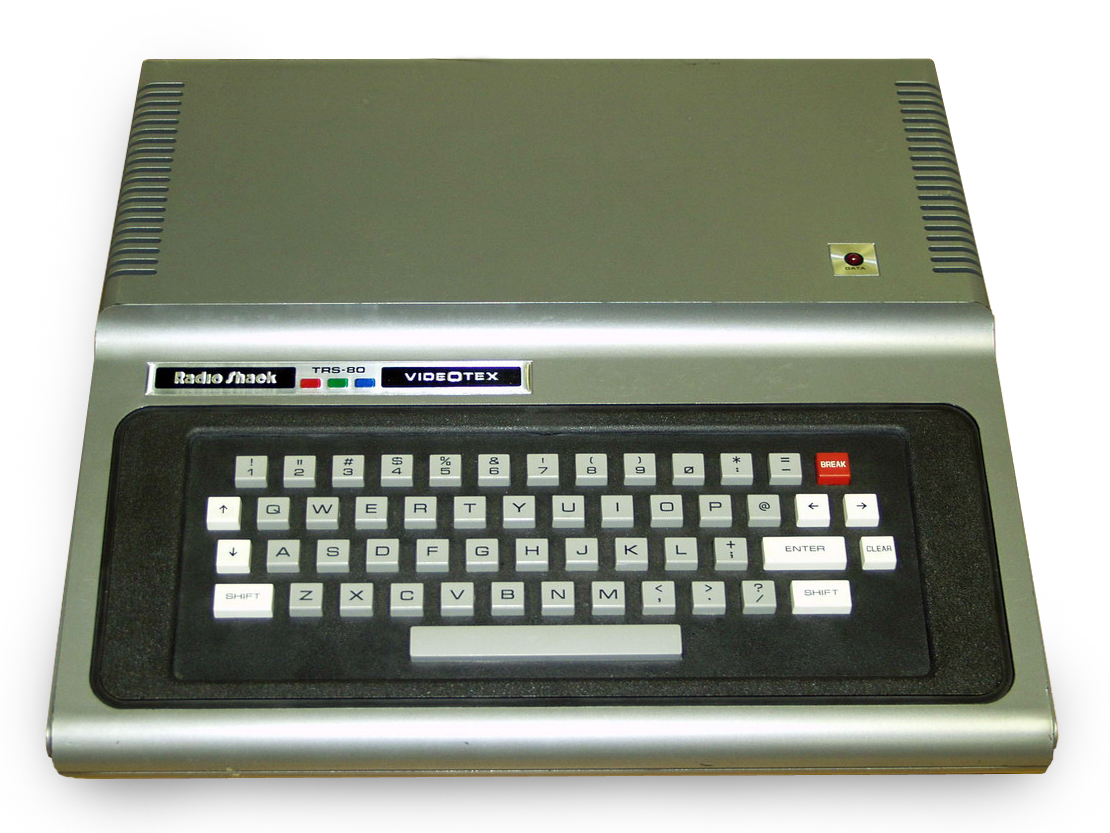
TRS-80 VideoTex Terminal, c. 1980

Tandy Corporation announced the TRS-80 Color Computer in July 1980 as a low-cost home computer. The Color Computer is a completely different design than the Zilog Z80-based TRS-80 models. BYTE wrote, "The only similarity between [the two computers] is the name".

The TRS-80 Color Computer derives from an "experimental videotext project by the Kentucky Cooperative Extension Service and the University of Kentucky College of Agriculture" in 1977. Motorola Semiconductor of Austin, Texas, won the contract for the user terminals and Tandy's Computer Division joined later to manufacture the terminals. The initial goal of this project, called "Green Thumb", was to create a low cost videotex terminal for farmers, ranchers, and others in the agricultural industry. This terminal would connect to a phone line and an ordinary color television and allow the user access to near-real-time information useful to their day-to-day operations on the farm.

Motorola's MC6847 Video Display Generator (VDG) chip was released about the time the joint venture started. The 1978 prototype "Green Thumb" terminal used the MC6847 and the Motorola 6809 microprocessor. However, the prototype contained too many chips to be commercially viable. Motorola responded by integrating the functions of many smaller chips into one chip: the MC6883 Synchronous Address Multiplexer (SAM). The SAM, VDG, and 6809 were used as the core of the AgVision terminal. It was also sold through Radio Shack stores as the VideoTex terminal around 1980.

The VideoTex terminal provided the foundation for a general-purpose home computer. The internal modem was removed, and I/O ports for cassette storage, serial I/O, and joysticks were provided. An expansion connector was added to the right side of the case for future enhancements and ROM cartridges ("Program Paks"). A sticker indicating the amount of installed memory in the machine covers the hole where the modem's LED "DATA" indicator had been. On July 31, 1980, Tandy announced the TRS-80 Color Computer, which shares the same case, keyboard, and layout as the AgVision/VideoTex terminals.

Tandy viewed businesses as its primary market for computers. Although the company's Ed Juge said in 1981 that the Color Computer was "our entry into the home-computer market", he described it as "for serious professionals", stating that a word processor and spreadsheet would soon be available. The initial model (catalog number 26-3001) shipped with 4 KB of dynamic random access memory (DRAM) and 8 KB Microsoft BASIC in ROM. Its price was US$399 (equivalent to $1,560 in 2025). Within a few months, Radio Shack stores across the US and Canada began selling the new computer.

== Color Computer 1 (1980–1983) ==
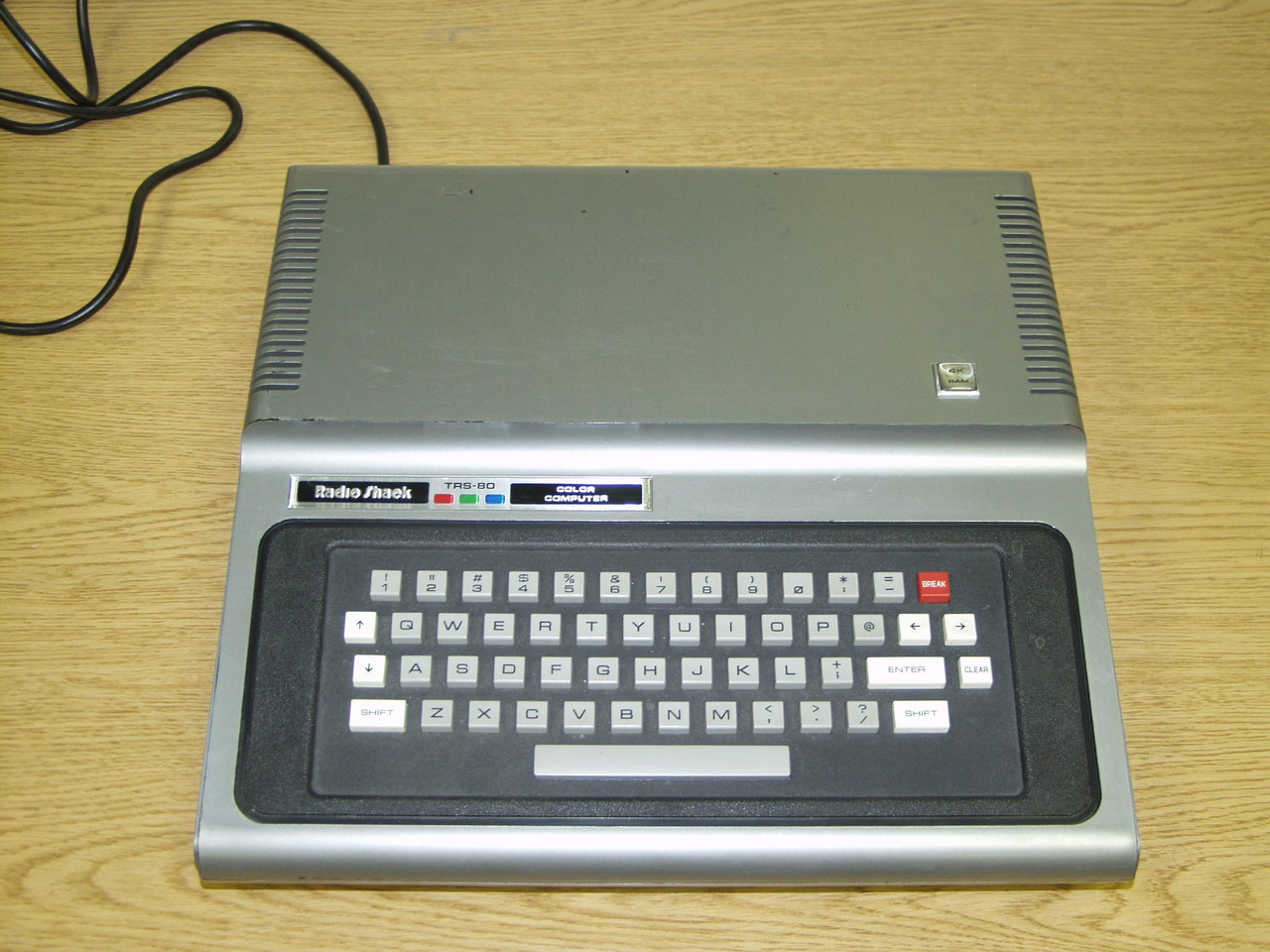
4K TRS-80 Color Computer from 1981 (model 26-3001)

The original version of the Color Computer sports a large silver-gray case with a calculator-like chiclet keyboard and was available with memory sizes of 4K (26-3001), 16K (26-3002), or 32K (26-3003). Versions with at least 16K of memory installed shipped with standard Microsoft Color Basic or (optionally) Extended Color BASIC. The only available connection to a display device is to a TV.

Early versions of the CoCo 1 have a black keyboard surround, the TRS-80 nameplate above the keyboard to the left side, and a RAM badge ("button") affixed on the top and right side of the case. Later versions removed the black keyboard surround and RAM button, and moved the TRS-80 nameplate to the mid-line of the case.

The computer is based on a single printed-circuit board with all semiconductors manufactured by Motorola including the MC6809E CPU, MC6847 VDG, MC6883 SAM, and RAM, which consists of 2104 (4Kx1) chips (4K models) or 4116 (16Kx1) chips (16K models). The early CoCos only have eight RAM sockets, so upgrading to 32K requires piggybacking two sets of 4116 chips and adding a few jumper wires. A later motherboard revision removed the 4K RAM option and were upgraded to 32K with "half-bad" 4164 DRAMs. These boards have jumpers marked HIGH/LOW to determine which half of the memory chip was good. As memory production yields improved and costs went down, many (perhaps most) 32K CoCo 1s shipped with perfectly good 4164 memory chips. Utilities and programs began to take advantage of the hidden 32K.

Users opening the case risked invalidating the warranty. Radio Shack could upgrade all versions that shipped with standard Color BASIC to Extended Color BASIC, developed by Microsoft, for $99. BYTE wrote in 1981 that through Extended Color BASIC, Radio Shack "has released the first truly easy-to-use and inexpensive system that generates full-color graphics". Eventually the 32K memory option was dropped entirely and only 16K or 64K versions were offered.

In late 1982, a version of the Color Computer with a white case, called the TDP System 100, was distributed by RCA and sold through non-Tandy stores. Except for the nameplate and case, it is identical to the Color Computer.

Later, both the CoCo and the TDP System 100 shipped with a white case with ventilation slots running the length of the case rather than only the sides. This ventilation scheme carried over to the CoCo 2. Some late versions of the CoCo have a modified keyboard, often referred to as the "melted" keyboard, with bigger keycaps.

Peripherals included tape cassette storage, serial printers, a 5.25-inch floppy disk drive, a pen and graphics tablet called the X-Pad, speech and sound generators, and joysticks.

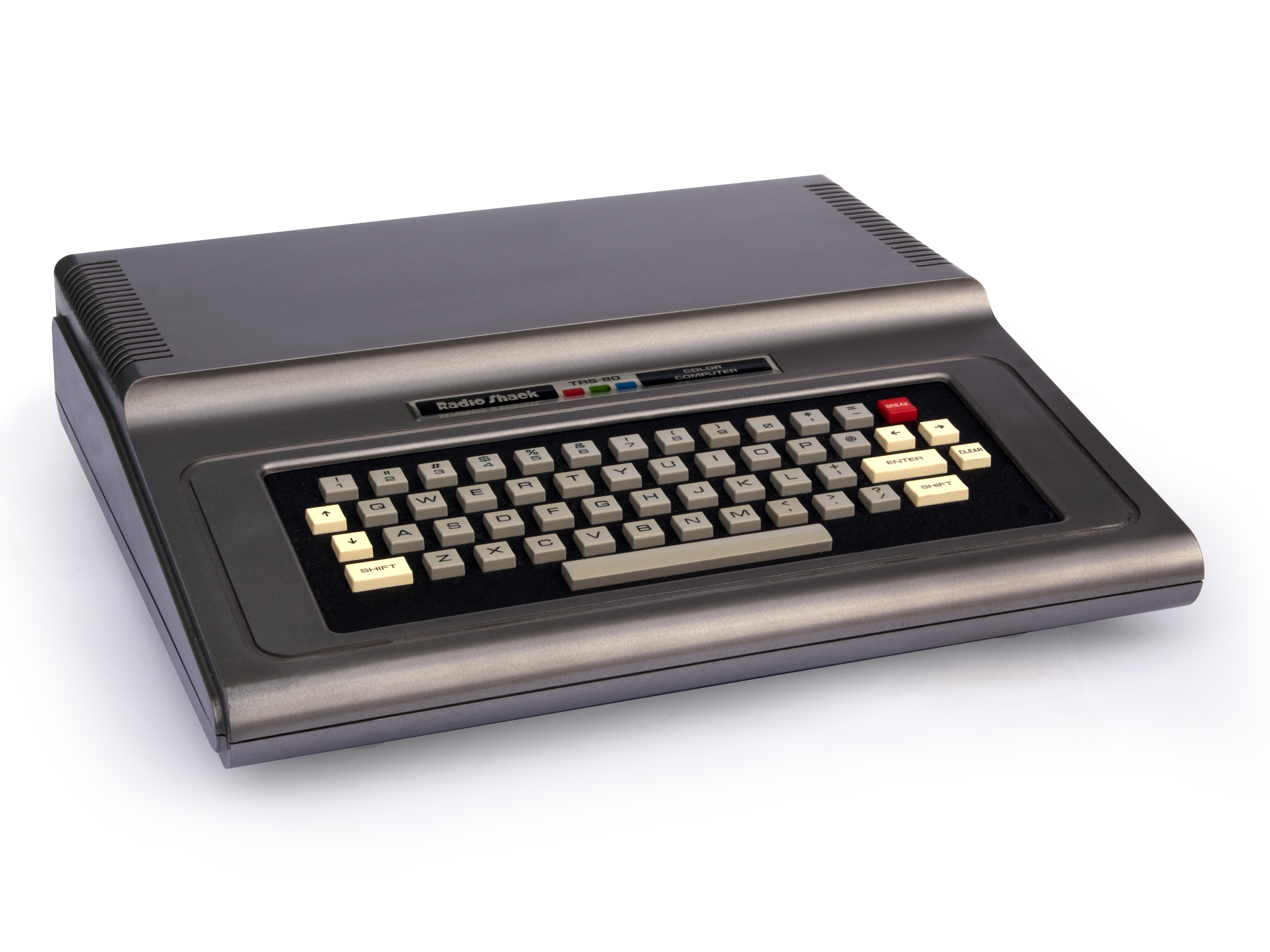
16K TRS-80 Color Computer 1

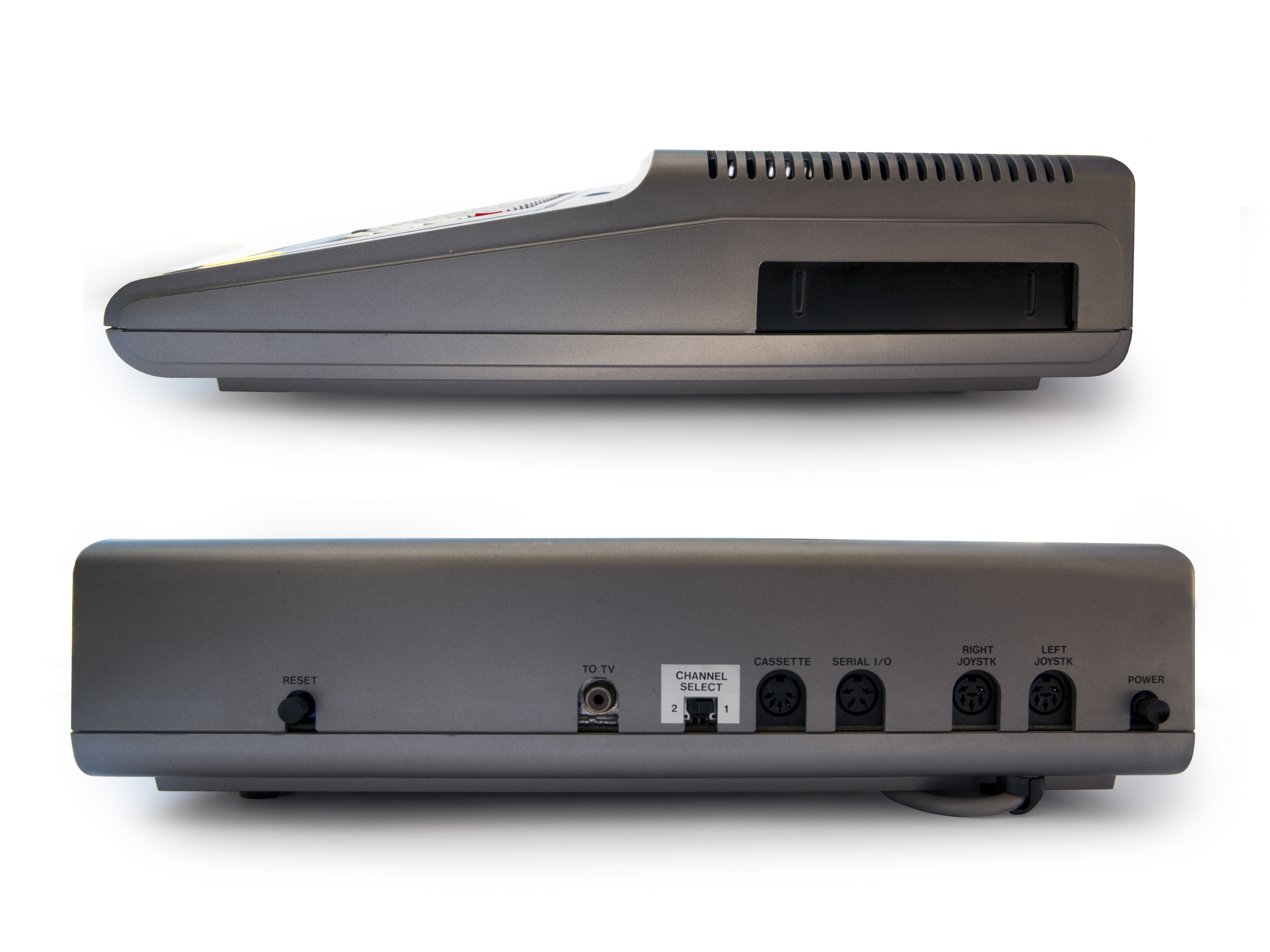
I/O ports and cartridge slot on the TRS-80 Color Computer 1

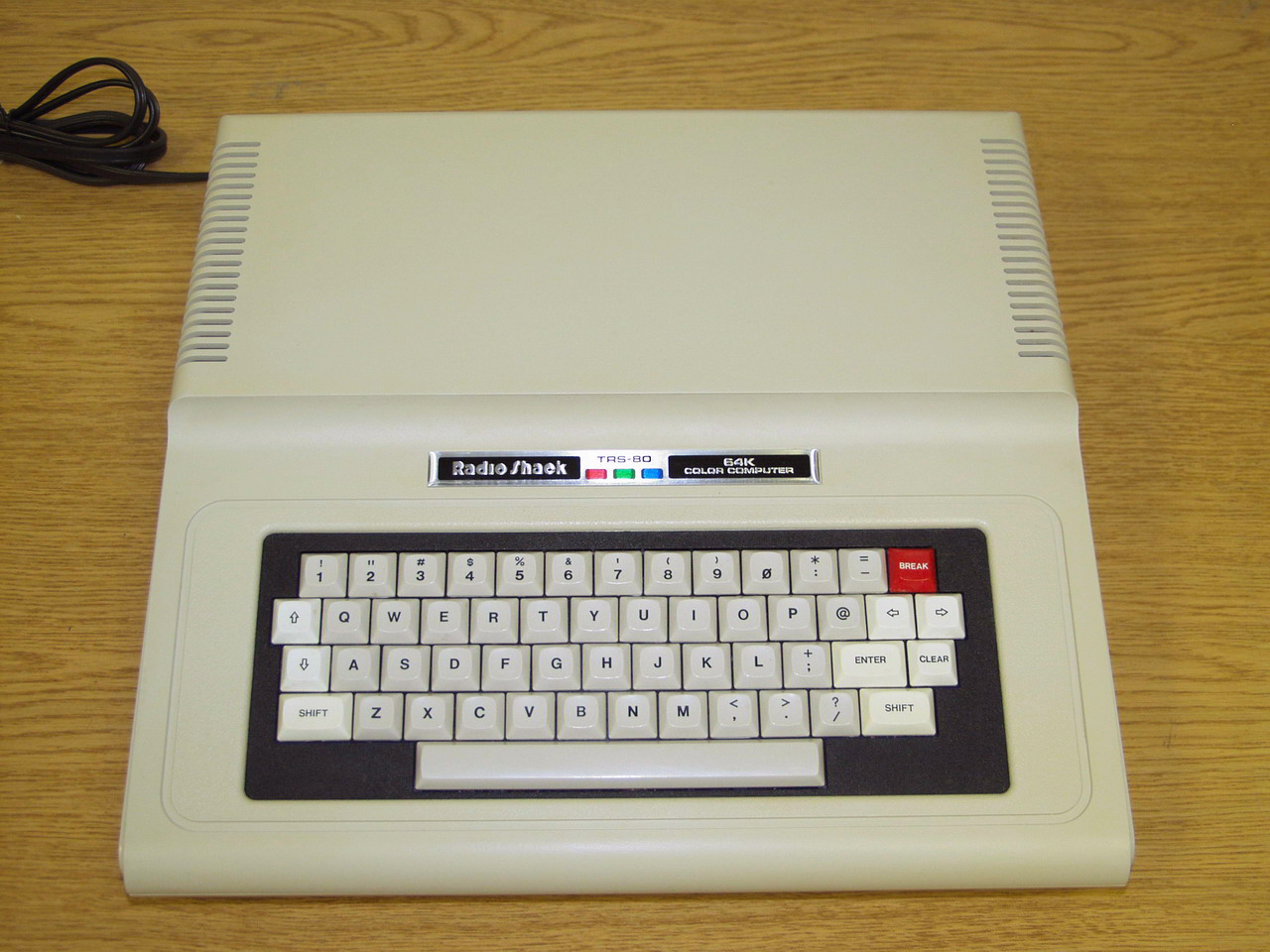
Late "white" model TRS-80 Color Computer 1

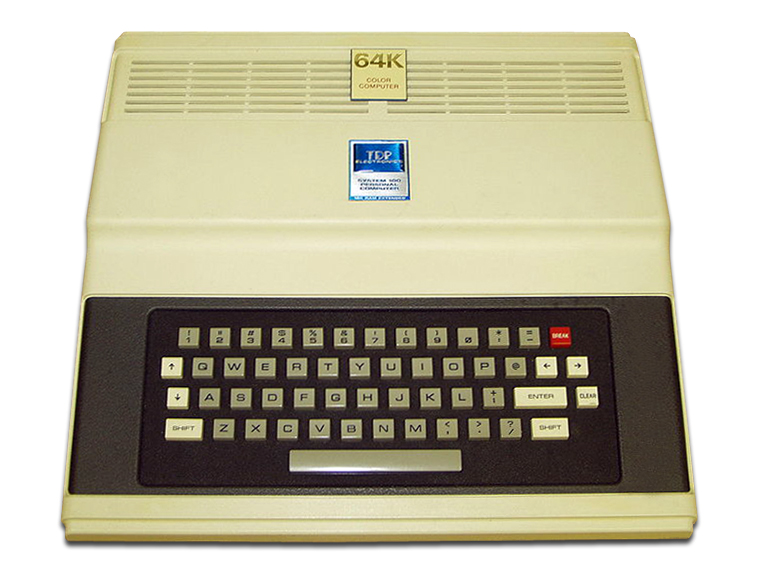
Tandy Data Products TDP-100 (with user-added 64K badge)

== Color Computer 2 (1983–1986) ==
Tandy Color Computer 2
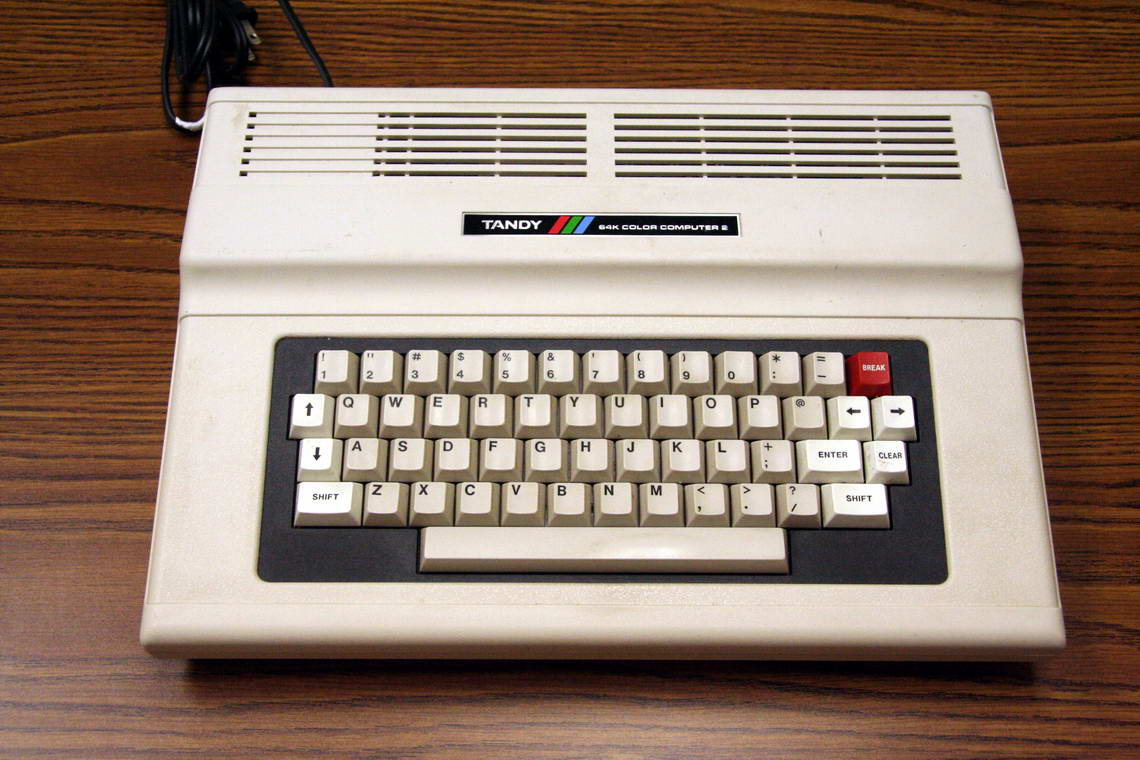
- Final production 64K model (26-3127B)
- Developer: Tandy Corporation
- Manufacturer: Motorola
- Released: 1983; 43 years ago
- Introductory price: US$159 (equivalent to $510 in 2025)
- Operating system: Color BASIC / OS-9 Level 1 with disk-drives
- CPU: 6809E @ 0.895 MHz
- Memory: 16 / 32 / 64 KB
- Graphics: MC6847 video display generator
- Sound: 6-bit DAC
- Backward compatibility: Tandy Color Computer 1
- Predecessor: Tandy Color Computer 1
- Successor: Tandy Color Computer 3

During the initial CoCo 1 production run, much of the discrete support circuitry had been re-engineered into a handful of custom integrated circuits, leaving much of the circuit board area of the CoCo 1 as empty space. To cut production costs, the case was shortened by about 25% and a new, smaller power supply and motherboard were designed. The "melted" keyboard from the white CoCo 1 and the TDP-100 style ventilation slots were carried over. Aside from the new look and the deletion of the 12 volt power supply to the expansion connector, the computer was compatible with the previous generation. The removal of the 12V power supply crippled some peripherals such as the original floppy disk controller, which then needed to be upgraded, installed in a Multi-Pak interface, or supplied with external power.

The CoCo 2 was sold in 16K and 64K models. 16K models use 16Kx1 DRAMs, but the chips are not the common 4116; they were instead 4517s (Radio Shack P/N 8040517), which use only +5V power rather than the triple voltages used by the 4116. 64K models use standard 4164 chips and have a control register at $FFDE/$FFDF to switch between the second 32K of RAM and the OS ROMs. With the ROMs banked out, the entire 64K of system RAM can be accessed.

Upgraded BASIC ROMs add minor features and fix some bugs. A redesigned 5-volt disk controller was introduced with its own new Disk BASIC ROM (v1.1). It adds a new command, DOS, to auto-boot software from disk (this requires a disk with a special boot sector). This allows the use of software on copy protected disks or third-party operating systems, chiefly OS-9.

Production was partially moved to Korea, with production in the US and Korea happening in parallel using the same part numbers.

Around March 1984, Radio Shack began advertising a 64K version of the CoCo 2 which also included an 'enhanced' full-travel, typewriter-style keyboard in the production run, replacing the previous "melted" keyboard.

The final significant change in the life of the CoCo 2 (models 26-3134B, 26-3136B, and 26-3127B; 16K standard, 16K extended, and 64K extended respectively) was to use the enhanced VDG, the MC6847T1, allowing lowercase characters and changing the text screen border color. These features were not enabled in BASIC. Midway during the production run of these models, the nameplate was changed from "Radio Shack TRS-80 Color Computer 2" to "Tandy Color Computer 2". The red, green, and blue shapes were replaced with red, green, and blue parallelograms.

Creative Computing wrote in December 1984 that the Color Computer was the best educational computer under $1000. The magazine said that it had fewer but better-quality educational software titles than the Commodore 64, and that Radio Shack was dedicated to the educational market while Commodore was not.

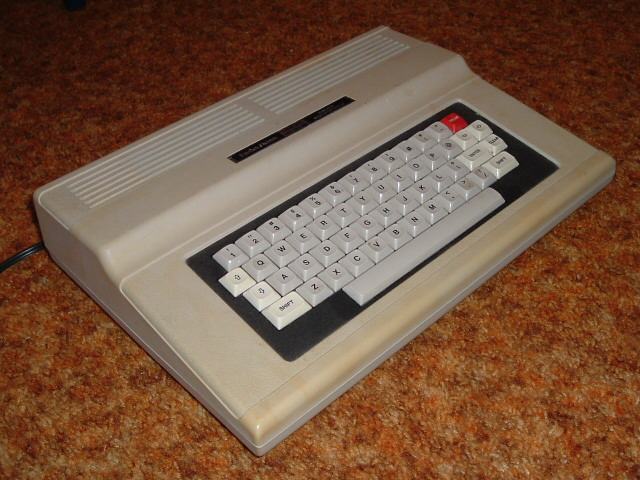
Early TRS-80 Color Computer 2 with "melted" keyboard

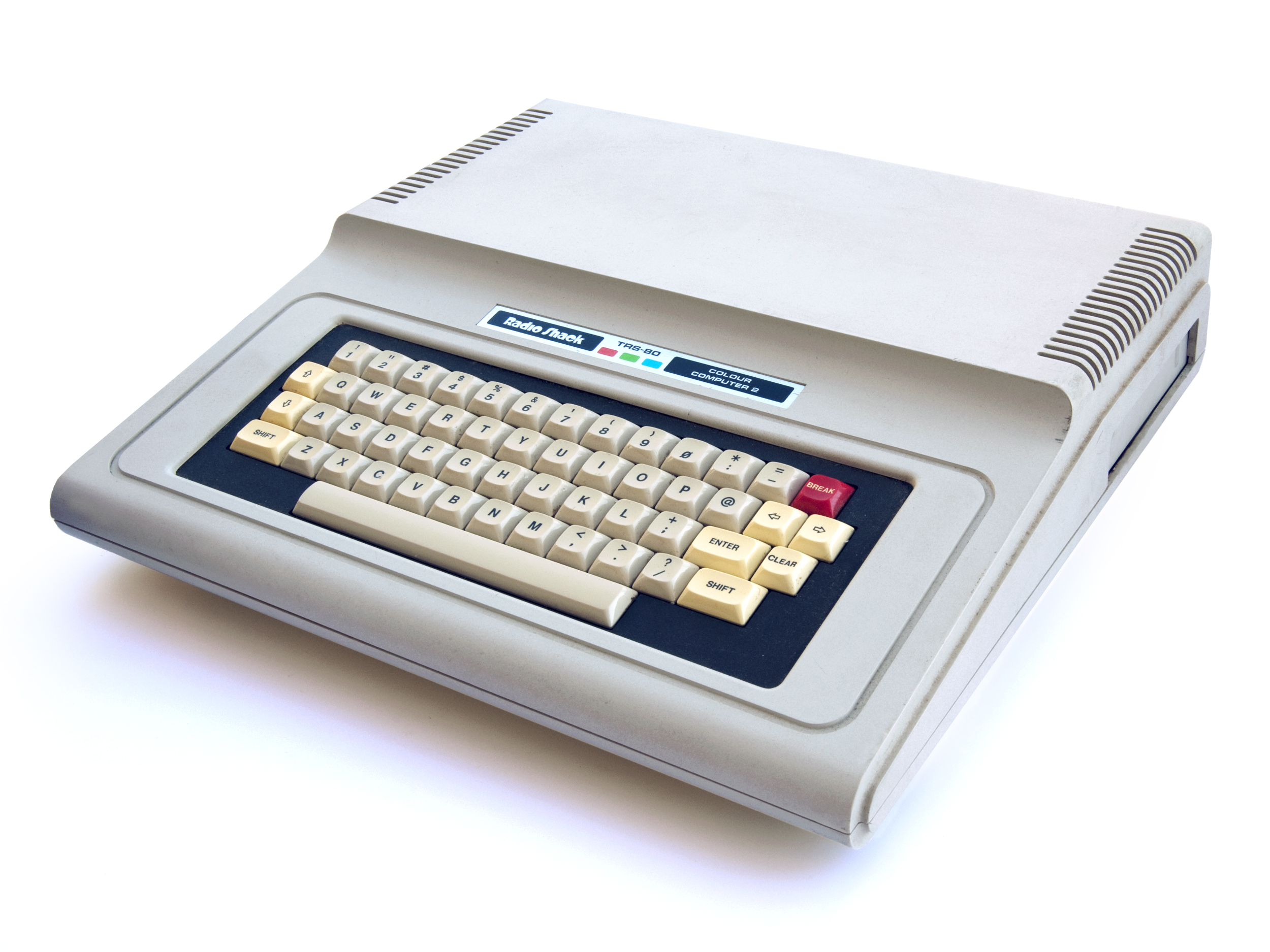
PAL version of the TRS-80 Color Computer 2

== Color Computer 3 (1986–1991) ==
Tandy Color Computer 3
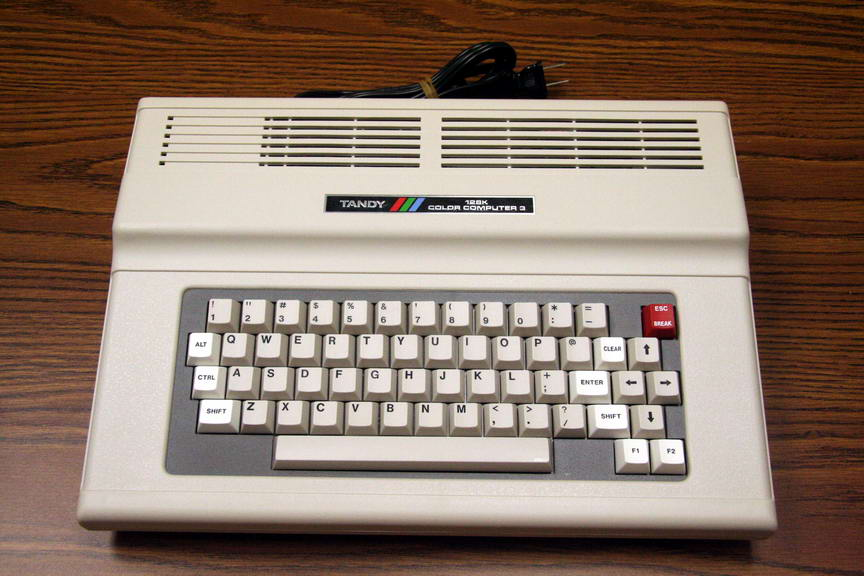
- 128K model 26-3334
- Developer: Tandy Corporation
- Manufacturer: Motorola
- Released: 1986; 40 years ago
- Introductory price: US$219 (equivalent to $640 in 2025)
- Discontinued: 1991
- Operating system: Disk Extended Color BASIC / OS-9 Level 2 with disk-drives / RS-DOS
- CPU: 6809E @ 0.895 / 1.79 MHz
- Memory: 128 / 512 KB
- Display: RGB or composite display; 160, 256, 320 or 640 pixels wide by 192 to 225 lines; 64 color palette
- Graphics: Advanced Color Video Chip (ACVC) also known as GIME (Graphics Interrupt Memory Enhancer)
- Sound: 6-bit DAC
- Backward compatibility: Tandy Color Computer 2
- Predecessor: Tandy Color Computer 2

By 1985, Color Computer users worried that the company would abandon their computer in favor of the Tandy 1000. Tandy executive Ed Juge stated that year that "No home computer on the market today has the potential horsepower of the Color Computer ... we believe [it] also has a good future".

On July 30, 1986, Tandy announced the Color Computer 3 at the Waldorf-Astoria Hotel in New York City. It came with 128 KB of RAM, which could be upgraded to 512 KB. The panel behind the keyboard and cartridge door plastic were changed from black to grey. The keyboard layout was revised, putting the arrow keys in a diamond configuration and adding CTRL, ALT, CLEAR, F1 and F2 keys. It sold in Radio Shack stores and Tandy Computer Centers for $219.95.

The CoCo 3 is compatible with most older software and CoCo 2 peripherals. The 6809 in the CoCo 1 and 2 runs at 0.895 MHz. The CoCo 3 runs at that frequency by default, but is software controllable to run at twice that rate; OS-9 takes advantage of that capability. Taking the place of the graphics and memory hardware in the CoCo 1 and 2 is an application-specific integrated circuit called the GIME (Graphics Interrupt Memory Enhancement) chip. The GIME also provides:

- Output to a composite video monitor or analog RGB monitor, in addition to the CoCo 1 and 2's TV output. This improves the clarity of its output.
- A paged memory management unit breaks up the 6809's 64 KB address space into 8 × 8 KB chunks. The scheme would later allow third party RAM upgrades of up to 2 MB (256 × 8 KB).
- Text display with real lowercase at 32, 40, 64, or 80 characters per line and between 16 and 24 lines per screen.
- Text character attributes, including 8 foreground and 8 background colors, underline, and blink.
- New graphics resolutions of 160, 256, 320 or 640 pixels wide by 192 to 225 lines.
- 320x192x4, 320x192x16, 640x192x2, and 640x192x4 from a palette of 64 colors. There are two palette modes - RGB (3 base colors with 3 levels of intensity and white, black and two gray tones) and Composite (16 distinct colors with 4 levels of intensity).

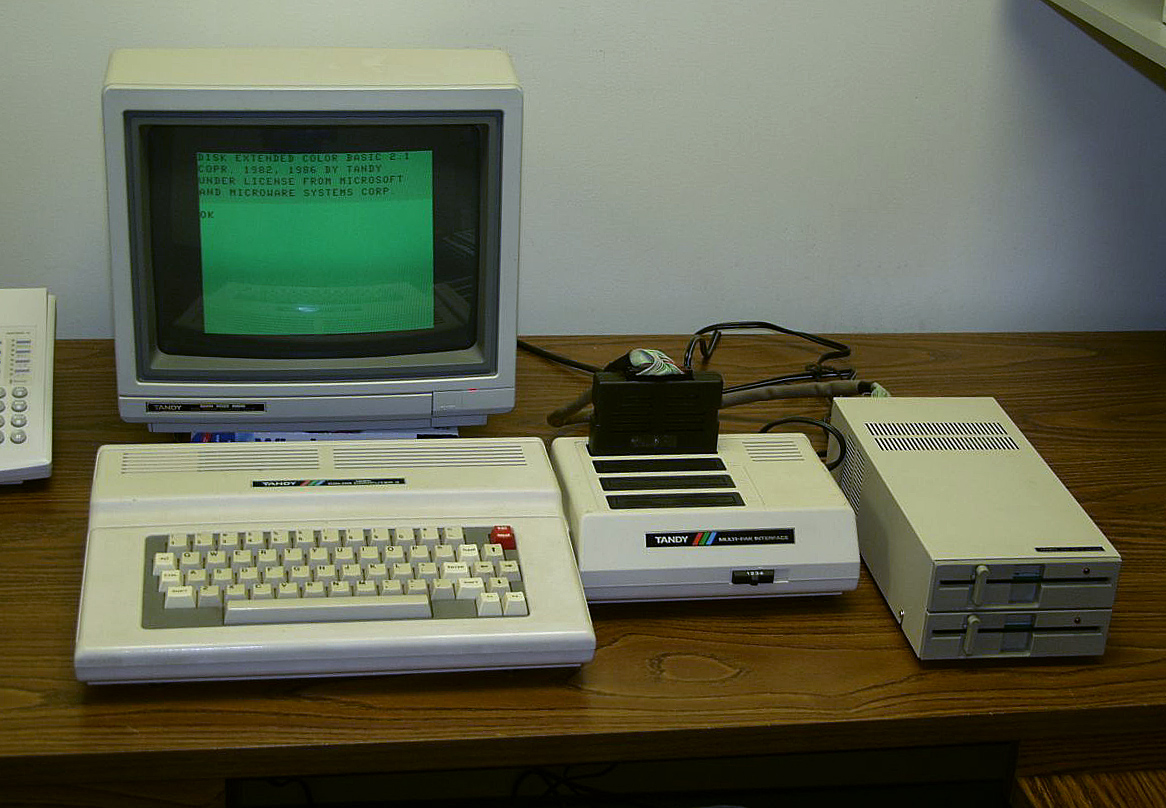
CoCo 3 with Multi-Pak interface and dual floppy drives

Omitted from the GIME are the seldom-used SAM-created Semigraphics 8, 12, and 24 modes. A rumored 256-color mode (detailed in the original Tandy spec for the GIME) has never been found.

Previous versions of the CoCo ROM were licensed from Microsoft, but Tandy could not convince them to provide further BASIC updates. Instead, Microware provided extensions to Extended Color BASIC to support the new display modes. To not violate the spirit of the licensing agreement between Microsoft and Tandy, Microsoft's unmodified BASIC is loaded in the CoCo 3's ROM. Upon startup, the ROM is copied to RAM and patched by Microware's code. The patched code has several bugs, and support for many of the new hardware features is incomplete.

Microware also provided a version of the OS-9 Level 2 operating system shortly after launch. OS-9 uses memory-mapping (so each process has its own memory space up to 64K), windowed display, and a more extensive development environment that includes a copy of BASIC09. C and Pascal compilers were available. Members of the CoCo OS-9 community enhanced OS-9 Level 2 for the CoCo 3 at Tandy's request, but Tandy stopped production of the CoCo 3 before the upgrade was officially released. Most of the improvements made it into NitrOS-9, a major rewrite of OS-9/6809 Level 2 for the CoCo 3 to take advantage of the features and speed of the Hitachi 6309 (if available).

== Hardware ==
Internally the CoCo 1 and CoCo 2 models are functionally identical. The core of the system is virtually identical to the reference design included in the Motorola MC6883 data sheet and consists of five LSI chips:

- MC6809E Microprocessor Unit (MPU)
- MC6883/SN74LS783/SN74LS785 Synchronous Address Multiplexor (SAM)
- MC6847 Video Display Generator (VDG)
- Two Peripheral Interface Adapters (PIA), either MC6821 or MC6822 chips

=== SAM ===
The SAM is a multifunction device that performs the following functions:

- Clock generation and synchronization for the 6809E MPU and 6847 VDG
- Up to 64 KB dynamic random access memory (DRAM) control and refresh
- Device selection based on MPU memory address to determine if the MPU access is to DRAM, ROM, PIA, etc.
- Duplication of the VDG address counter to "feed" the VDG the data it is expecting

The SAM was designed to replace numerous small LS/TTL chips into one integrated package. Its main purpose is to control the DRAM but, as outlined above, it integrates several other functions as well. It is connected to a crystal at 4 times the television color burst frequency (14.31818 MHz for NTSC countries). This is divided by 4 internally and is fed to the VDG for its own internal timing (3.579545 MHz for NTSC). The SAM also divides the master clock by 16 (or 8 in certain cases) for the two phase MPU clock; in NTSC this is 0.89 MHz (or 1.8 MHz if divided by 8).

Switching the SAM into 1.8 MHz operation gives the CPU the time ordinarily used by the VDG and refresh. As such, the display shows garbage; this mode was seldom used. However, an unusual mode available by the SAM is called the Address Dependent mode, where ROM reads (since they do not use the DRAM) occur at 1.8 MHz but regular RAM access occurs at 0.89 MHz. In effect, since the BASIC interpreter runs from ROM, putting the machine in this mode would nearly double the performance of a BASIC program while maintaining video display and DRAM refresh. Of course, this would throw off the software timing loops and I/O operations would be affected. Despite this, however, the "high speed POKE" was used by many CoCo BASIC programs even though it overclocked the hardware in the CoCo, which was only rated for 1 MHz operation.

The SAM has no connection to the MPU data bus. As such, it is programmed in a curious manner; its 16-bit configuration register is spread across 32 memory addresses (FFC0-FFDF). Writing even bytes sets that register bit to 0, while writing odd bytes sets it to 1. The value (D7-D0) that is written is ignored.

Due to limitations in 40-pin packaging, the SAM contains a duplicate of the VDG's internal 12-bit address counter. Normally this counter's settings are set to duplicate the VDG's display mode. However, this is not required and results in the creation of some new display modes not possible when the VDG is used in a system alone. Instead of the VDG requesting data from RAM by itself, the VDG is "fed" data by the SAM's internal copy of the VDG address counter. This process is called "Interleaved Direct Memory Access" (IDMA) by Motorola and ensures that the processor and VDG always have full access to this shared memory resource with no wait states or contention.

There are two versions of the SAM. The early one is labeled MC6883 and/or SN74LS783; the later version is labeled SN74LS785. There are some minor timing differences, but the major difference is the support of an 8-bit refresh counter in the 785 version. This allowed for use of inexpensive 16K by 4-bit and certain 64K by 1-bit DRAMs. Some third-party bank-switching memory upgrades that used 256K DRAMs needed this 8-bit refresh counter to work.

=== VDG ===
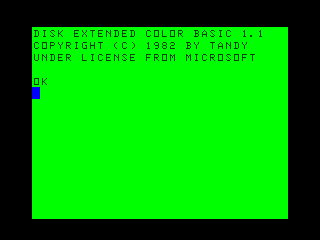
CoCo 2 power-on screen

The Motorola 6847 is a display generator capable of displaying text and graphics contained within a roughly square display matrix 256 pixels wide by 192 lines high. It can display 9 colors: black, green, yellow, blue, red, white, cyan, magenta, and orange.

==== Alphanumeric/Semigraphics display ====
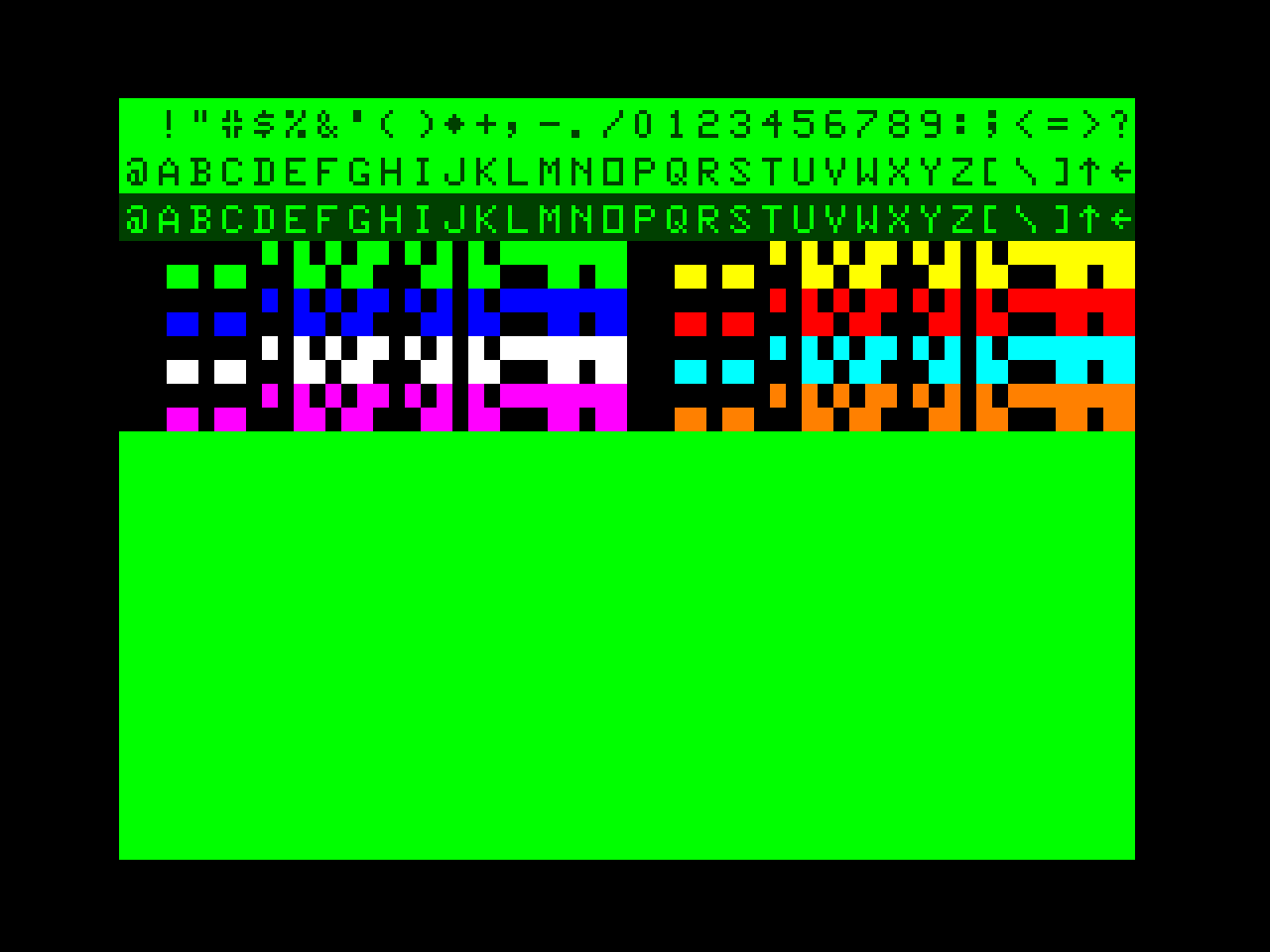
Sample MC6847 VDG character set display

In alphanumeric mode, each character is a 5 dot wide by 7 dot high character in a box 8 dots wide and 12 lines high. This display mode occupies 512 bytes of memory from $400-$5FF and is a 32 character wide screen with 16 lines. The ROM character generator only holds 64 characters, so no lowercase characters are provided. "Lowercase" characters are rendered as uppercase with inverted color. On most CoCo generations it is green on very dark green.

Semigraphics is a mode where alphanumerics and low resolution graphics can be mixed together. The 8th bit of a character determines if it is alphanumeric or treated as a 2 × 2 pixel grid. When the 8th bit is set, the next three bits determine the color and last 4 bits specify which quadrants of the character box are either the selected color or black. This allows a 64 × 32 graphics mode with 9 colors, the only mode where it is possible to display all 9 colors simultaneously.

There are two color sets. The default has black characters on a green background. The alternate has black characters on an orange background. The color set selection does not affect semigraphics characters. The border is always black.

The 6847 is capable of a Semigraphics 6 display mode, where two bits select a color and 6 bits determine which 1/6 of the character box is lit. Only 4 colors are possible, but the colorset bit of the VDG selects two groups of 4 colors. Only two colors are available in graphics blocks when using Semigraphics 6 on the CoCo.

The default alphanumeric display for the CoCo is Semigraphics 4.

==== Additional Semigraphics modes ====
By setting the SAM such that it believes it is displaying a full graphics mode, but leaving the VDG in Alphanumeric/Semigraphics 4 mode, it is possible to subdivide the character box into smaller pieces. This creates the "virtual" modes Semigraphics 8, 12, and 24. In these modes it was possible to mix bits and pieces of different text characters as well as Semigraphics 4 characters. These modes were an interesting curiosity but not widely used, as the Semigraphics 24-screen consumed 6144 bytes of memory. These modes were not implemented on the CoCo 3.

A programmer's reference manual for the CoCo states that due to a fire at Tandy's research lab, the papers relating to the semigraphics modes were shuffled, and so some of the semigraphics modes were never documented. CoCo enthusiasts created experimental programs to try to reverse engineer the modes, and were able to reconstruct the missing documentation.

==== Bitmap modes ====
Bitmap display modes are divided into two categories: resolution and color.

In resolution modes, each pixel is addressable as either on or off. There are two color sets available: black dots on a green background with a green border, and white dots on a black background with a white border.

In color modes, each pixel uses two bits to select one of four colors, with the overall colors determined by the colorset:

- a green border with the colors green, yellow, red, and blue;
- a white border with the colors white, cyan, magenta, and orange.

Resolution graphics store 8 pixels per byte and are available in 128×64, 128×96, 128×192, and 256×192 modes. Color graphics have 4 pixels per byte and are available in 64×64, 128×64, 128×96, and 128×192. The maximum size of a bitmap screen is 6144.

==== Artifact colors ====
Orange artifact color generated with the white and black colorset

The 256×192 two color graphics mode can display four colors due to a quirk in the NTSC television system. It is similar to the Apple II's DHGR graphics but slightly lower resolution and with four rather than six colors. These are called composite artifact colors. Two 6k pages can be used and the location of them differs depending on whether the disk controller is in use or not. If it is plugged into the expansion port, the graphics page begins at $E00 and at $600 if not (cassette software that utilizes the hi res mode would require the disk controller to be removed to ensure the graphics page is where the software expects it to be in).

In the first color set, where green and black dots are available, alternating columns of green and black appear as a muddy green color. With the white and black color set, the result is either orange or blue. Reversing the order of the alternating dots gives the opposite color. In effect, this mode is 128×192 with four colors: black, orange, blue, and white. On PAL televisions, instead of solid orange and blue, artifacts appear as vertical stripes of green and peach with soft edges and a width of almost four pixels. On a CoCo 3 with an analog RGB monitor, the black and white dot patterns do not artifact.

The bit patterns that represent orange and blue can be different each time the system is powered up. Most Color Computer games start with a title screen and ask the user to press the reset button until the colors are correct. This is fixed on the Color Computer 3 and the other color set can be chosen by holding F1 during reset.

==== Lowercase and the 6847T1 ====
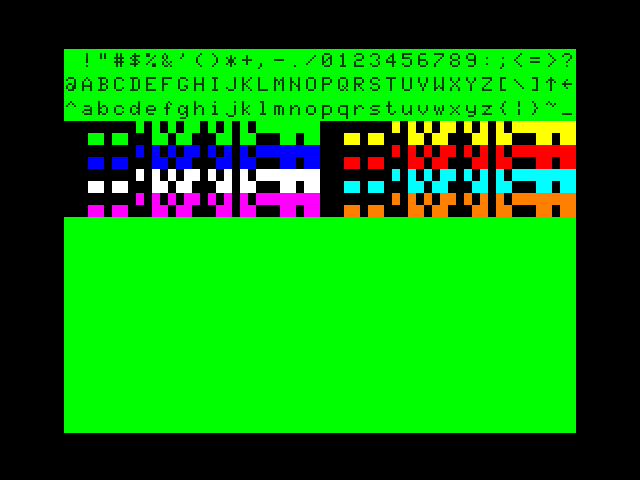
6847T1 VDG in true lowercase mode

The 6847 is capable of using an external character generator. Several third-party add-on boards allow the CoCo to display real lowercase characters.

Late in the CoCo 2 production run, the enhanced 6847T1 VDG was used. It includes a lowercase character generator and the ability to display a green/orange or black border on the text screen. The lowercase capability is disabled by default on these CoCo 2s, and is not mentioned in the manual.

=== Sound ===
There is a four position, software selectable, switch inside the case to determine which audio source is routed to the TV modulator.

Switch position	Audio source
0	Internal 6-bit digital-to-analog converter
1	Audio from cassette tape output
2	Audio from expansion port
3	None (silence)

An additional 1-bit sound output is always active.

Radio Shack sold two audio devices to attach to the expansion port. The Speech/Sound Pak includes an AY-3-8913 programmable sound generator and a SPO256-AL2 text to speech digital narrator. The Orchestra-90 Pak includes two 8-bit digital-to-analog converters.

=== Disk interface ===
The CoCo uses an external floppy disk controller that plugs into the side expansion port. The controller uses a WD 1791 FDC and a ROM-based disk operating system which is immediately available at power-on and does not require an OS disk (the CoCo 2-3 controller also supports booting alternative RAM-resident DOSes in place of the ROM one by typing the DOS command in BASIC). The CoCo 1 uses Shugart SA-400 full-height 5.25" drives which are 35 track single-sided units and formatted disks to 160k. They are similar to the TRS-80 Model I disk drives except for the custom modification of a power switch in the front faceplate. The CoCo 2-3 replaced these with 40 track half-height drives, two per unit (the existing 35 track 160k format was retained for compatibility purposes with the CoCo 1). The stock drives can be replaced by any Shugart-standard 34 pin interface units for additional storage space although the ROM DOS only supports default 160k format. The CoCo 1 controller has an older version of the WD 1791 FDC chip manufactured in enhancement load NMOS that needs three voltages to operate: 12V, 5V, and -5V. The CoCo 2 switched to a newer FDC that used a single 5V power line, and the 12V line was removed from the expansion port. Consequently the CoCo 1 controller will not work on the CoCo 2-3 nor will the latter's controller work on the CoCo 1.

The ROM DOS functions as part of BASIC and all disk commands are implemented as BASIC statements. BASIC programs can be loaded from disk by the LOAD command and LOADM for machine language programs.

=== PIAs ===
There are two Peripheral Interface Adapter chips in all CoCo models. The PIAs are dedicated to I/O operations such as driving the internal 6-bit digital-to-analog converter, controlling the relay for the cassette motor, reading the keyboard, controlling the VDG mode pins, and accessing the RS-232 serial I/O port.

The earliest CoCo models have two standard 6821 chips. Later, after changes in the keyboard design, the 6822 IIA (Industrial Interface Adapter) was used instead. The 6822 was eventually discontinued by Motorola, but was produced for Tandy as an application-specific integrated circuit with the part number SC67331P.

=== CoCo 3 hardware changes ===
In the CoCo 3, a new VLSI ASIC called (officially) the Advanced Color Video Chip (ACVC) or (unofficially) the Graphics Interrupt Memory Enhancer (GIME), integrated the functions of the SAM and VDG while enhancing the capabilities of both. The CoCo 3 supports 40- and 80-column text and the ability to run at 1.8 MHz without loss of video. The processor was changed to the 68B09E and the PIA was changed to the 68B21, which are 2 MHz parts.

== Discontinuation ==
On October 26, 1990, Tandy announced that the CoCo 3 would be dropped from its computer line.

Wayne Green wrote in 80 Micro in December 1982 that Tandy had "virtually abandoned" the Color Computer. As with its other computers, Tandy attempted to monopolize hardware and software sales, but, he wrote, the Color Computer was incompatible with other Tandy software and what was available was of poor quality. "I'm sure there are at least fifty software firms out there that would love to work with the Shack", Green said, but "it seems that the Shack people are at war with their supporters and potential suppliers". Many CoCo owners agree that Tandy did not take the computer seriously.

=== Successors ===
A few companies attempted to carry the CoCo torch, but the lack of decent backwards compatibility with the CoCo 3 failed to entice much of the community. Some of these systems run OS9/68k, which is similar to OS-9.

Frank Hogg Labs introduced the Tomcat TC-9 in June 1990, which is somewhat compatible with the CoCo 3, but is only able to run OS-9 software. A later version called the TC-70 has strong compatibility with the MM/1, and also runs OS-9/68K.

Multi-Media One was introduced in July 1990, runs OS-9/68K on a 15 MHz Signetics 68070 processor with 3 MB RAM, and a 640×208 graphics resolution as well as supporting a 640×416 interlaced mode. It includes a SCSI interface, stereo A/D and D/A conversion, an optional MIDI interface, and an optional board to upgrade the CPU to a Motorola 68340. The AT306 (also known as the MM/1B) is a successor to the MM/1 that contains a Motorola 68306 CPU, OS-9/68K 3.0, and allows ISA bus cards. It was created by Kevin Pease and Carl Kreider, and sold by Carl's company, Kreider Electronics.

Peripheral Technology produced a 16 MHz Motorola 68000 system called a PTK68K-4. Delmar sold systems based on the PT68K-4 and called the Delmar System IV. The PT68K-4 has the footprint of an IBM PC and seven 8-bit ISA slots. Video is provided by a standard video card and monitor, but for high-resolution graphics the software only supports certain video cards.

Gary Becker produced the CoCo3FPGA for Terasic DE FPGA boards. It contains a 6809 CPU core which can run at 25 MHz. It adds 256-color graphics modes, including a 640x450 mode.

Roger Taylor developed a CoCo 3 clone, Matchbox Coco, based on the DE0-Nano FPGA board. Renamed to RealCoCo, it has been ported to other FPGA hardware.

== Clones and cousins ==
The Dragon 32 and 64 are British cousins of the CoCo based on a reference design from Motorola that was produced as an example of the capabilities of the MC6809E CPU when coupled with the MC6847 Video Display Generator and the MC6883 Synchronous Address Multiplexer. The BIOS for the Dragon 32 was written based on specifications and API drawn up by Microsoft and, to a certain extent, PA Consulting of Cambridge. The Dragon was a much improved unit with video output in addition to the TV output of the CoCo and CoCo 2. It also featured a Centronics parallel port (not present on any CoCo), an integrated 6551A serial UART (on the Dragon 64), and a higher-quality keyboard. In 1983, a version of the Dragon was licensed for manufacture for the North American market by Tano Corporation of New Orleans, Louisiana. Tano started production at their 48,000-square-foot (4,500 m^{2}) facility in September 1983 and were running at capacity one month later. Sales did not meet expectations and Tano stopped production and support after a year.

In Brazil, there were several CoCo clones, including the Prológica CP 400 Color and CP 400 Color II, the Varix VC 50, the LZ Color 64, the Dynacom MX-1600, the Codimex CD-6809, and the vaporware Microdigital TKS800.

In Mexico, the Micro-SEP, a CoCo 2 clone with 64 KB of memory, was introduced by the Secretary of Education. The Micro-SEP was intended to be distributed nationally to all the public schools teaching the 7th to 9th grades. They were presented as a design of the Center of Advanced Research and Studies of Instituto Politécnico Nacional. Like the Dragon, these computers also included video output. Whether these computers were "designed" by this institute, or were licensed from the original design, is unclear.

A Taiwan-based company, Sampo, also made a CoCo clone, the Sampo Color Computer. The Sampo was supposedly available in Taiwan, Korea, and possibly other Asian countries. It is believed that Tandy blocked sales in the US with legal action due to copyright infringements on the ROM code.

The TRS-80 MC-10, or Micro Color Computer, was sold in Radio Shack stores as an entry-level computer at a lower cost than the CoCo. Released in 1983, it was similar in appearance to the Timex Sinclair. Like the CoCo, it uses the MC6847 VDG and Microsoft BASIC, but with the MC6803 instead of the 6809.

== See also ==
- List of TRS-80 Color Computer games
