= LZ Color 64 =

8-bit home computer produced in Brazil

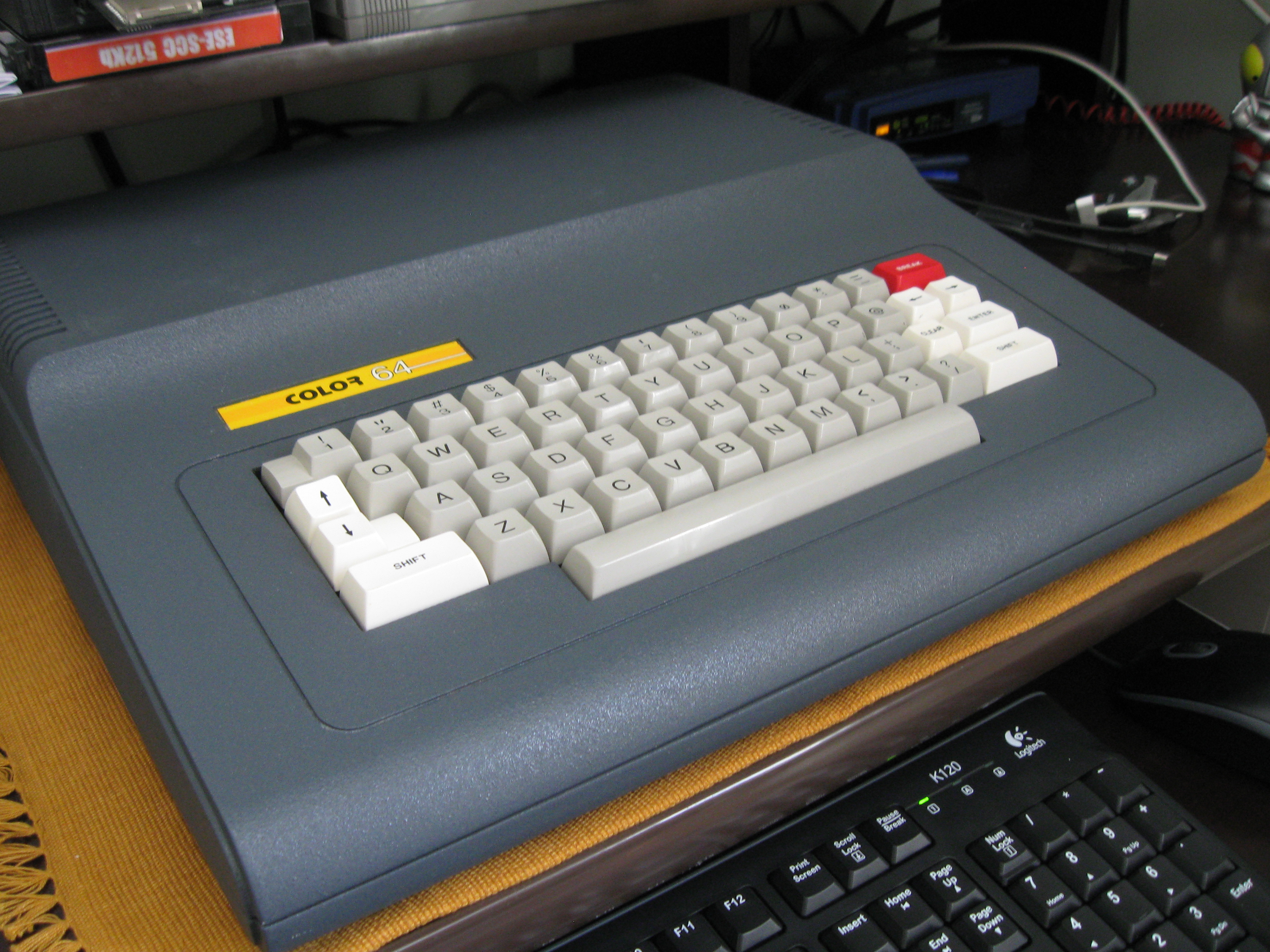
- LZ Color 64
- Manufacturer: Novo Tempo / LZ Equipamentos
- Released: 1983; 43 years ago
- Lifespan: 1986; 40 years ago
- Introductory price: 1.2 million Cr$
- Operating system: Color BASIC, Extended Color BASIC
- CPU: 6809E @ 0.895 / 1.79 MHz
- Memory: 64 kB
- Display: Composite video out (PAL-M TV with external modulator)
- Graphics: MC6847 video display generator
- Sound: 6-bit DAC
- Backward compatibility: TRS-80 Color Computer

The Color 64 was an 8-bit home computer produced in Brazil by the Rio de Janeiro company Novo Tempo / LZ Equipamentos between 1983 and 1986. It was one of the many machines based on the TRS-80 Color Computer introduced during the Brazilian "Market Reserve", like the Codimex CD-6809 or Prológica CP 400 COLOR.

== History ==
Launched in mid-1983, the Color 64 was the second Brazilian TRS-80 Color Computer clone. The production line was installed in the old premises of Cervejaria Skol in Rio de Janeiro.

Due to its graphic and sound capabilities, Novo Tempo/LZ developed the "Computational Resources Switch" ("Comutador de Recursos Computacionais"), a piece of hardware designed for the educational market, allowing the creation of a small computer network. With it, a teacher could control ten other Color 64s, sharing programs and a printer.

Despite being one of the first TRS-80 Color clones in Brazil, its success was limited to the Rio de Janeiro state, due to limited marketing in the rest of the country. According to Folha de S.Paulo, the Color 64 had a retail price of 1.2 million Cr$ in July 1984.

To publicize TRS-80 Color Computers in Brazil and increase Color 64 sales, Novo Tempo/LZ encouraged the creation of user clubs in Rio de Janeiro. The largest one was "Clube Color", operating on the premises of the Micromaq software house.

Production of the Color 64 was discontinued in 1986, with the arrival of MSX machines offering better color and sound capabilities.

== Technical features ==
The basic features of the LZ Color 64 are similar those of the TRS-80 Color Computer.

- CPU: Motorola 6809E, 890 kHz to 1.8 MHz
- Memory:
  - ROM: 16 KB (containing Color BASIC and Extended Color BASIC)
  - RAM: 64 KB
- Keyboard:
  - Built-in, 53-keys
- Display: Motorola 6847, 9 colors
  - Text mode (with 32 x 16 characters)
  - Low resolution graphics (with 64 x 32 pixels)
  - Medium and high resolution graphics (up to 256 x 192 pixels, 2 or 4 colors)
- Expansion port (cartridges, disk interfaces, etc.)
- Other ports:
  - Composite video monitor (PAL-M color TV using an external modulator)
  - RS-232C serial port
  - Analogue or digital joysticks
  - Cassette recorder (1500 baud, with remote engine control)

== See also ==
- Motorola 6809
- CP 400 COLOR
- Codimex CD-6809
- TRS-80 Color Computer
