= Prológica CP-400 =

8-bit home computer produced in Brazil

CP 400 COLOR
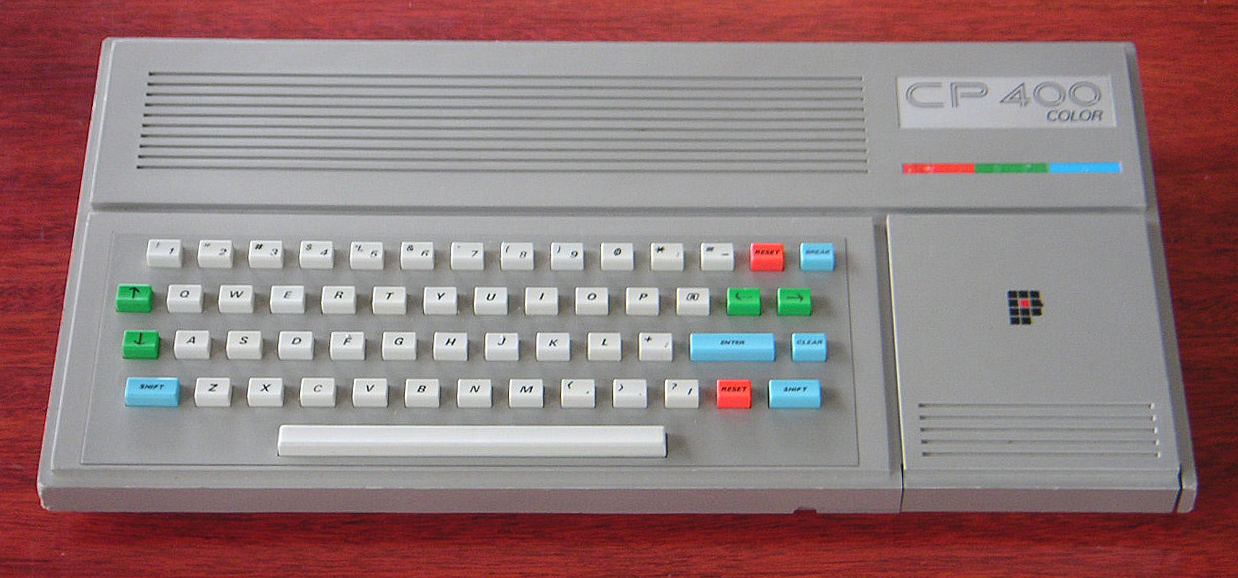
- Manufacturer: Prológica
- Type: Home computer
- Released: 1984; 42 years ago
- Discontinued: 1987; 39 years ago
- Operating system: Color BASIC
- CPU: Motorola 6809E @ 0.89 MHz
- Memory: 16 or 64 KB RAM
- Storage: Audio cassette, Floppy disk
- Display: PAL-M video out, RGB video output
- Graphics: MC6847 video display generator
- Sound: 6-bit DAC
- Connectivity: RS232, tape interface, joystick connectors, cartridge port
- Backward compatibility: TRS-80 Color Computer 2

The CP 400 COLOR was launched in 1984 by Prológica, a Brazilian company which made clone versions of various computers, under the general designation of "CP" (for "Computador Pessoal" in Portuguese, "Personal Computer" in English).

This machine was TRS-80 Color Computer 2 clone, but had a different case than the original machine. The computer was 100% compatible with the original TRS-80 Color Computer 2, and was designed to work with the PAL-M TV standard used in Brazil.

== Models ==
=== CP 400 COLOR ===
The first version of the CP 400 Color, launched in December 1984, featured a plastic chiclet keyboard with white, red, green, and blue keys. The keys were made of good quality plastic and, despite being small, they had a good response and a pleasant touch.

The design of the first model was conceived by the postmodern Italian architect Luciano Deviá, representative of the Turin School. According to the artist, the small, colorful keys gave "a somewhat playful air to the computer", as it was for domestic use, thus needing to "harmonize with even decorative objects". Although the design of the CP 400 is attributed to the aforementioned Italian artist, its notable similarity with the Timex Sinclair 2068, also launched at the end of 1983 in the United States, remains unexplained.

The CP 400 COLOR was available with both 16 or 64 KB of RAM, and had a 55 key chiclet keyboard. At the back there were ports for TV out, RGB video monitor, cassette recorder, serial port, power supply and joysticks. At the front there was a cartridge slot. Due to a design error, there could be problems with the unit overheating.

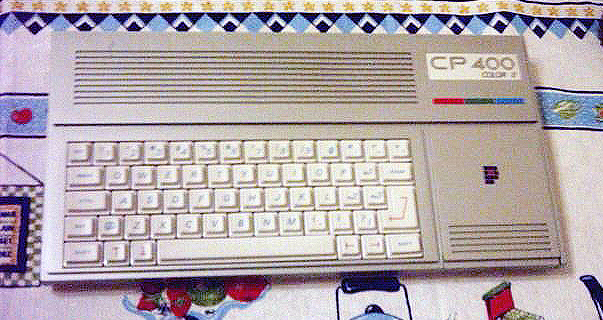
Prológica CP 400 Color II microcomputer, a TRS-80 Color Computer clone from Brazil

=== CP 400 COLOR II ===
The CP 400 COLOR II, launched at the end of 1985, offered an external power supply, better keyboard (with four extra keys: CTRL, PA1, PA2 and PA3) and 64KB of RAM.

It was advertised as "professional", with the extra keys being programmable by the user and, thus, assisting in the operation of the computer. Despite the announced evolution of the keyboard, its keys were wobbly and did not have the same precision as the previous model. In some cases, the keys even came off the keyboard during use, due to the fragile spring system they had. Because of this, the new keyboard received the curious nickname of "frog". The overheating issue has been resolved, however.

== Details ==
Technical details for both CP 400 models:

- Motorola MC6809E microprocessor @ 0.895 MHz.
- Memory:
  - ROM: 16 KB (containing "Extended Color BASIC" or "ECB");
  - RAM: 16 or 64 KB versions.
- Keyboard:
  - CP 400 COLOR: chiclet keyboard with 55 keys, incorporated into the cabinet;
  - CP 400 COLOR II: professional keyboard with 59 keys, incorporated into the case.
- Video: Motorola MC6847 microprocessor, 9 colors:
  - Text mode (with 32 x 16 characters), with 16 graphic characters;
  - Low resolution graphics (128 x 96 pixels, 2 or 4 colors per pixel);
  - Medium resolution graphics (128 x 192 pixels, 2 or 4 colors per pixel);
  - High resolution graphics (256 x 192 pixels, 2 colors per pixel);
- Support serial printer, analog joysticks, cassette recorder and floppy disk drive (CP 450).
- Expansion port
- Other ports:
  - PAL-M color TV, 3 or 4 VHF channels;
  - RS-232C serial port;
  - two analog joysticks;
  - monitor port (composite video output);
  - cassette recorder;
  - external 110/220V power supply.
- Magnetic Storage:
  - Cassette recorder at 1500 baud, with remote motor control;
  - CP 450 floppy disk drive, with up to two 180K drives, single sided.

=== RAM ===
Although the CP 400 was available in two versions, with 16 or 64 KB of RAM, this memory was not completely freed up for the user. In fact, for the 16 KB version, the total available memory is around 8 KB; and for the 64 KB version, this total becomes around 24 KB. This is because the CP 400 uses 16 KB to address ROM memory, which contains Extended Color BASIC, and 16 KB for cartridge use, while another 8 KB is used to allocate high-resolution video memory.

=== Expansion Port ===
Like the Timex Sinclair 2068, the CP 400 had an expansion connector, protected by a portcullis, on the right side of the unit. This connector, with 40 pins arranged in two rows of twenty, was used to connect the CP450 floppy disk drive or connect ROM program cartridges, for instant loading.

Prológica itself has launched dozens of game and utility titles, including: Attack, Crash, Bingo, Castle, Checkers, Dinosaurs, Editor, Climbing, Skiing, Graphics, Islands, Invaders, Labyrinth, Meteor, Nebula, Pegacome, Pipoca, Saltimbanco, Tennis, Horror, Target Shooting and Chess. All of them, in fact, were programs originally developed for the Tandy Color Computer, but translated and packaged in a new physical cartridge format, especially designed for use in the CP 400 (in effect, it was not possible to use CP cartridges 400 in other computers compatible with the TRS-80 Color standard, nor use cartridges designed for these other machines in the CP 400).

=== Input/Output Ports ===
On the back of the CP 400 there were several DIN ports for connecting other accessories and peripherals. Unlike Dynacom, which preferred to change the design of Tandy 's TRS-80 Color Computer on its own in its MX-1600, thus adopting connectors that were easier to find on the Brazilian market, Prológica - as well as other national manufacturers of compatible computers with the TRS-Color line - preferred in this matter to remain faithful to the North American original design.

==== RS232C ====
The serial interface compatible with the RS232C standard allowed the CP 400 to be connected to a serial printer or modem. It used a female 4-pin DIN connector:

- Pin 1: (CD) Carrier signal detection
- Pin 2: (RX) Data reception
- Pin 3: (GND) Ground (reference voltage 0)
- Pin 4: (TX) Data transmission

==== Recorder ====
The standard storage medium for the CP 400 was through connection with a common cassette recorder, via a triple cable connected to the EAR (headphone), MIC (microphone) and REM (remote control) connectors. The CP 400 employed a 5-pin female DIN connector:

- Pin 1: (REM) Output for remote control socket
- Pin 2: (EAR) Input for headphone jack
- Pin 3: (GND) Ground
- Pin 4: (MIC) Output for microphone or auxiliary jack
- Pin 5: (REM) Output for remote control socket

The recorder expressly recommended by Prológica for CP 400 users was the National RQ2222, which was also advertised in the pages of Geração Prológica magazine . Among other features, the RQ2222 had a head system suitable for use with microcomputers and a tape counter, making it easier to locate programs recorded on the cassette. For better performance of the device, avoiding undesirable errors when recording or reading magnetic tapes, it was recommended to use the tone in position '10' (maximum treble) and volume '2' for recording or '7' for reading.

==== Joysticks ====
The CP 400 had two independent sockets for connecting two analog joysticks (left and right), using 5-pin female DIN connectors:

- Pin 1: Comparator input (right-left)
- Pin 2: Comparator input (up-down)
- Pin 3: Ground
- Pin 4: Fire button (Fire!)
- Pin 5: Vcc +5V (current limited)

==== Video Monitor ====
A 7-pin female DIN connector was used, however the pinout arrangement differed between the CP 400 Color and the CP 400 Color II, the latter having additional features:

CP 400 Color

- Pin 1: (Not used)
- Pin 2: (Not used)
- Pin 3: (Not used)
- Pin 4: Ground
- Pin 5: Video
- Pin 6: Ground
- Pin 7: Audio

CP 400 Color II

- Pin 1: Luminance
- Pin 2: (Not used)
- Pin 3: Vcc +5v
- Pin 4: Audio
- Pin 5: Ground
- Pin 6: Ground
- Pin 7: Video

=== Operating systems ===
The 64 KB of RAM version of the CP 400 Color was capable of running OS-9 Level 1 from Microware, and Flex9 from TSC, as long as it was used in conjunction with the CP450 disk drive. However, it was not possible to run OS-9 Level 2, developed for the Tandy Color Computer 3, which had many more technological resources than the CP 400, which was, in turn, only compatible with the Tandy Color Computer 2.

Prológica also offered, native to its CP450 unit, the so-called DOS400. In fact, it was "Disk Extended Color BASIC" ( DECB or RSDOS) from Tandy Radio Shack, renamed and, most likely, used unlimitedly without prior license or knowledge from the American company (a practice that became "very common" in Brazil at the time of the Market Reserve and which possibly contributed to the end of Prológica, when it was sued for piracy by Microsoft).

Even though Prológica intended to launch in 1985 a compatibility card with the CP/M operating system, thus allowing the use of professional programs and applications developed for this environment and used by other equipment produced by the company (CP-500, Sistema 600 and Sistema 700), there is no news that it actually did so.

== Reception ==
Even though the CP 400 accounts for a large part of Prológica's revenue, it never offered great technical support to its users. Even Editele - a company belonging to the Prológica group - specializing in the publication of technical books in the IT area, made only a single title available: "Indo Além com o CP 400 Color", by Paulo Addair (1985), which presented lists of programs aimed at exploring more advanced features of the equipment. Apart from this title, Editele, as would be expected, was responsible for the official CP 400 manuals ( "Manual de Operação e Linguagem - CP 400 Color" and "Sistema de Operação em Disco DOS 400, which accompanied the CP 400 and the CP450 unit, respectively).

The Brazilian publishing market also did not pay much attention to CP 400 users. Very few titles were published:

- "30 Programas para o TRS-80 Color Computer e Similares Nacionais" (30 Programs for the TRS-80 Color Computer and Similar National Machines), by Mário Mendes Junior, ed. Modern Science Computing.
- "Brincando com o TRS Color" (Playing with TRS-Color), by Victor Mirshawka, ed. Nobel.
- "TRS-80 Color: Guia de Referência" (TRS-80 Color: Reference Guide), by Roberto Valois, ed. Campus.
- "Tudo sobre os Microcomputadores TRS-80 Color para Meninos" (Everything about TRS-80 Color Microcomputers for Boys), by Eli Rozendo Moreira dos Santos, ed. Ediouro.

As a result, software houses such as Micromaq, Plansoft, Peek & Poke, Softkristian and Engesoft, among others, reproduced and sold foreign works, especially by North American authors, given the success of the TRS-80 Color line in that country and the greed for information among Brazilian users.

Unlike the United States, where several monthly magazines specializing in Color Computer emerged, none emerged in Brazil. Sporadically, however, it was possible to find listings in Color BASIC in generic computer magazines, especially in the then highly respected Micro Sistemas . On the other hand, the magazine Geração Prológica, published by Editele, had a brief life: just 18 issues; materials and programs related to CP 400 occur only between numbers 9 and 17.

In the beginning, the CP 400's competition was reduced. Its direct competitor was the TK-2000, from Microdigital Eletrônica, with similar sound and graphic abilities, as national clones of the Apple IIe were considerably more expensive. This situation would soon change, initially with the launch of the TK-90X, a clone of the ZX-Spectrum introduced by Microdigital in June 1985, and mainly with the beginning of sales of MSX standard micros by Gradiente and Epcom/Sharp in December 1985. Quite superior graphically and sonically, the MSX impressively entered the Brazilian home PC scene and left all competitors behind.

In addition to the Prológica CP 400, other microcomputers compatible with the TRS-80 Color standard were launched in Brazil: the Codimex CD6809, the LZ/Novo Tempo Color64, the Dynacom MX-1600 and the Engetécnica/Varix VC50 (or Varix 50). Microdigital also planned to launch another machine compatible with this line: the TKS800; It was presented but was never actually launched on the market. There was also, on the Brazilian market, a semi-compatible one: the Sysdata Microcolor (or TColor), a clone of the obscure Tandy MC-10. However, all this equipment had little or almost no repercussion in the national market, whether, initially, due to the great sales success of the CP 400, or, finally, due to the great expansion of the MSX line in Brazil, which ended up relegating the TRS-80 Color standard to disuse.

The CP 400 and all its original peripherals were no longer manufactured by Prológica, at its unit in the Socorro neighborhood in São Paulo, at the beginning of 1987. However, shortly before, in April 1986, it was selling around two and a half thousand units a month, according to information provided by Prológica itself.

With the end of the production line and the lack of information and support for the CP 400, most of its users adhered to the MSX standard, while some others, realizing the beginning of a new era in the microcomputer market, migrated to the IBM PC standard.

== See also ==
- Codimex CD-6809
- LZ Color 64
- TRS-80 Color Computer
