= Codimex CD-6809 =

8-bit home computer produced in Brazil

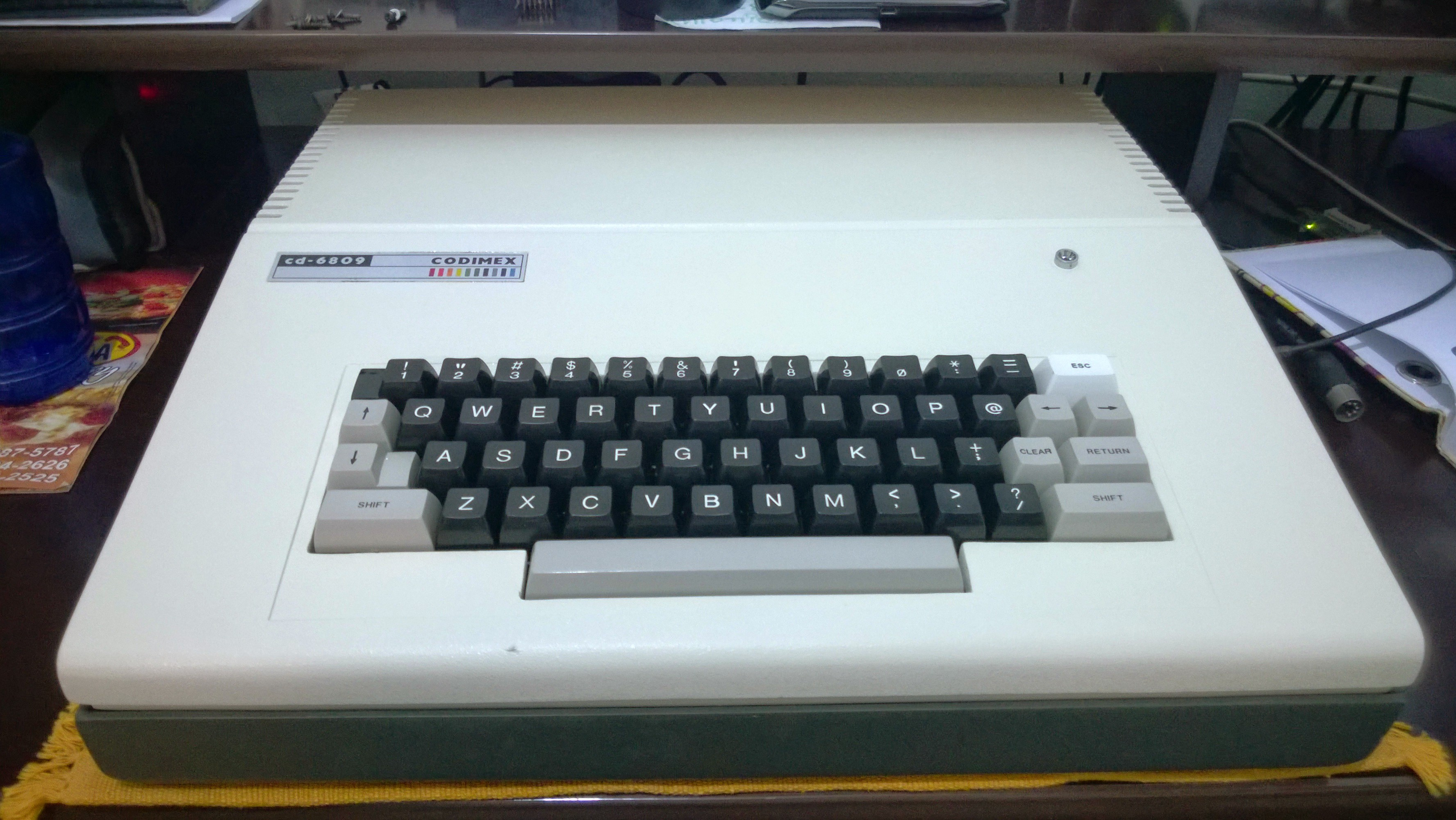
- Codimex CD-6809
- Manufacturer: Codimex
- Released: 1983; 43 years ago
- Lifespan: 1985; 41 years ago
- Units sold: 380
- Operating system: Microsoft Extended Color BASIC, Tandy RSDOS, Microware OS-9, TSC Flex9
- CPU: 6809E @ 0.895 / 1.79 MHz
- Memory: 32 kB
- Display: RF out, PAL-M
- Graphics: MC6847 video display generator
- Sound: 6-bit DAC
- Backward compatibility: TRS-80 Color Computer

The Codimex CD-6809 was an 8-bit home computer produced in Brazil by the company Codimex Imp.Exp. de Computadores Ltda from Porto Alegre. It was introduced in early 1983, during the Brazilian "Market Reserve" period, and based on the TRS-80 Color Computer.

The CD-6809 was the first Brazilian home computer compatible with the TRS-80 Color line. It was marketed as a computer for small business, entertainment and self employed professionals, and was sold with a 149-page user manual.

Around 380 units were produced at the Porto Alegre plant. The machine can be emulated under MAME.

== Technical features ==
The basic features of the Codimex CD-6809 are similar to the TRS-80 Color Computer:

- CPU: Motorola 6809E, 895 kHz to 1.79 MHz
- Memory:
  - ROM: 16 KB (containing "Color BASIC 1.1" and "Extended Color BASIC 1.0")
  - RAM: 32 KB
- Keyboard:
  - Built-in, 53-keys
- Display: Motorola 6847, 9 colors
  - Text mode (with 32 x 16 characters)
  - Low resolution graphics (with 64 x 32 pixels)
  - Medium and high resolution graphics (up to 256 x 192 pixels, 2 colors per pixel)
- Expansion port (cartridges, 40 pin)
- Other ports:
  - PAL-M RF out
  - RS-232C serial port (5 pin DIN)
  - Joysticks (5 pin DIN)
  - Cassette recorder (1500 baud, with remote engine control, 5 pin DIN)

The machine had a unique "Reverse Video" switch on the back, that displayed a black background with green characters.

== See also ==
- Motorola 6809
- CP 400 COLOR
- LZ Color 64
- TRS-80 Color Computer
