= Extended Color BASIC =

- First appeared: 1984; 42 years ago
- Stable release: Extended Color BASIC, Enhanced Color BASIC, Disk Color BASIC
- Platform: Color Computer 2, Color Computer 3

Extended Color Basic is an update to the Color BASIC interpreter for the Radio Shack/Tandy TRS-80 Color Computer series, and is the default Basic interpreter for the Color Computer 2. The Color Computer Basic implementations are somewhat different for the versions of Basic which come with the other family of TRS-80 machines, namely Basic Levels I, II, and III. Assemblers and Pascal and C programming language compilers are available for the different machines in the series. Modified subsets of Color Basic may be found on many of the Radio Shack PC series of pocket computers (PC-1 to PC-4 by Sharp, PC-5, PC-6 to PC-8 by Casio) of the era.

Color Basic was updated again for the Color Computer 3 and some sources refer to it as Enhanced Color Basic. A version containing routines for disk management known as Disk Color BASIC was also developed for these machines. Updates to the language include routines such as PLAY (for use with the sound facility), DRAW (for vector graphics and other things with lines) and other additions as well as undocumented functions such as those inherited originally from the original Color Basic to work with the semi-graphics modes. A fifth programming language for this series of computers is the Basic interpreter which runs on the Radio Shack/Tandy MC-10, a small computer marketed beginning in 1984.
