= Kay 1024 =

Russian clone of the ZX Spectrum

- Developer: NEMO
- Type: Home computer
- Released: 1998; 28 years ago
- Operating system: TR-DOS
- CPU: Zilog Z80A @ 3.5 or 7 MHz
- Memory: 1024 KB
- Display: RGB monitor/ TV out; 256x192
- Sound: Beeper, AY-3-8910
- Backward compatibility: ZX Spectrum

The Kay 1024 was a Russian ZX Spectrum clone introduced in 1998. Created by the NEMO company of St. Petersburg, it has 1024 KB of RAM. It was a rival to Scorpion ZS 256, having a slightly lower price. It offered a controller for a PC keyboard and HDD, but not for floppy disks (although available as an extension card). Adding a General Sound card was easy, and the CPU had a 7 Mhz turbo mode.

Earlier versions of the machine were known as Kay 128 and Kay 256.

The Kay 2006 NB (North Bridge) is a 2006 version based on the Altera EPM7064 MAX. It adds three new graphics modes: Multicolor, GigaScreen and 512×192 pixels in 2 colors.

The Kay 2010 or Kay 1024/SL4 is a 2010 update of the original KAY 1024 with a few minor additions and improvements. The Kay 2010 mainboards are manufactured in Chelyabinsk.

== Specifications ==
Brief technical specifications of KAY-1024 computer:

- Supplied as a complete board, with a IS-DOS floppy disk, drivers and utilities, a ribbon cable and instructions (on a single sheet of paper). A 40 MB hard drive with the preinstalled operating system was an option.
- 1024 Kb RAM (61 pages), usable as 256 Kb (7FFD 1FFD) plus a 640 Kb RAM disk in TR-DOS (virtual drive "C").
- The Z80A 3.5 MHz CPU has no wait states and a 7 MHz turbo-mode. The turbo mode can be controlled by software, logical level on bus, or by an external button.
- KAY-1024/3SL/TURBO motherboard with three slots for additional devices: floppy disk controller, IDE drive, IBM PC keyboard, modem, etc (no soldering needed).
- Built-in hard drive support in ROM. IS-DOS may be loaded directly from hard drive, accessible from the computer main menu.
- The IDE hard drive interface for Nemo-bus and IS-DOS can be used within TR-DOS.
- IBM PC keyboard and mouse controller (Kempston mouse).
- XTR-Modem, for Nemo-bus.
- 5.25″ and 3.5″ disk drives.
- "BETA-TURBO" floppy disk controller for Nemo-Bus.
- Optional: AY-3-8910, Z84C0010PEC, Z84006PEC, ROM 27C512 with KAY-1024 ROM set, real-time clock IC "Dallas", ribbon cables for HDD and FDD; General Sound external sound card, Nemo-bus compatible; General Sound memory module.
- Kempston and Sinclair joysticks.
- Complete Centronics printer interface.
