= ATM (computer) =

ZX Spectrum clone developed in Moscow in 1991 by MicroArt and ATM

ATM Turbo
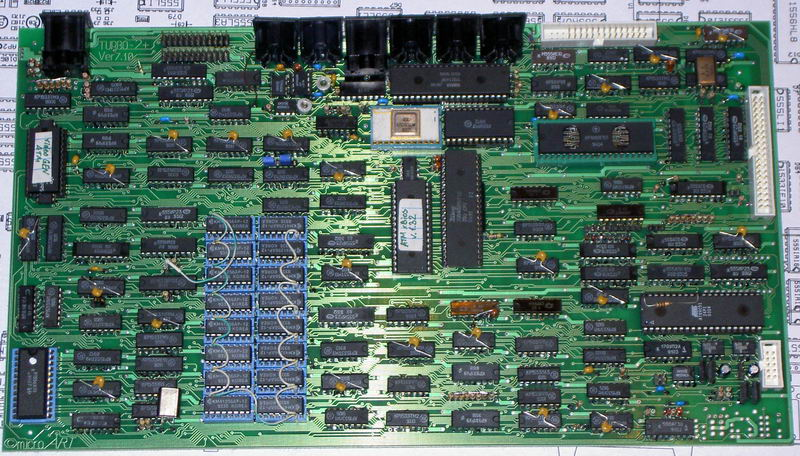
- ATM Turbo 2+ motherboard
- Also known as: АТМ-ТУРБО
- Developer: MicroArt and ATM; NedoPC
- Type: Home computer
- Released: 1991; 35 years ago
- Operating system: ATM Turbo 1: Sinclair BASIC, TR-DOS, CP/M; ATM Turbo 2+: iS-DOS/TASiS, DNA OS, Mr Gluk Reset Service
- CPU: Zilog Z80 @ 3.5 and 7 MHz; 14 MHz (ZX Evolution)
- Memory: 128 to 512 KB (ATM Turbo 1); 128 to 1024 KB (ATM Turbo 2+); 4MB RAM (ZX Evolution)
- Storage: Floppy disk, IDE devices (ATM Turbo 2)
- Removable storage: SD card (ZX Evolution)
- Display: SECAM TV, EGA monitor, VGA monitor (ZX Evolution)
- Graphics: 256x192, 320x200, 640x200
- Sound: Beeper (1-bit); AY-3-8910; Covox
- Backward compatibility: ZX Spectrum
- Related: Pentagon (computer)

The ATM Turbo (ru: "АТМ-ТУРБО"), also known simply as ATM (from ru: "Ассоциация Творческой Молодёжи", meaning "Association of Creative Youth") is a ZX Spectrum clone, developed in Moscow in 1991, by two firms, MicroArt and ATM.

It offers enhanced characteristics, compared to the original Spectrum, such as a Z80 at 7 MHz, 1024 kB RAM, 128 kB ROM, AY-8910 (two chips in upgraded models), 8-bit DAC, 8-bit 8-channel ADC, RS-232, parallel port, Beta Disk Interface, IDE interface, AT/XT keyboard, text mode (80x25, 16 colours, 8x8 pattern), and three new graphics modes.

The ATM can be emulated in Unreal Speccy v0.27 and higher.

== History ==
ATM was developed in 1991 based on the Pentagon, a ZX Spectrum clone popular in Russia. In 1992 an upgraded model was introduced, named ATM Turbo 2. Up to 1994 the computer was produced by ATM and MicroArt; later the firms separated and production ended.

In 2004 NedoPC from Moscow resumed production. New versions called ATM Turbo 2+ and ZX Evolution were introduced.

== Characteristics ==
=== Graphics modes ===
For compatibility purposes, the original 256 x 192 ZX Spectrum mode is available.

New graphics modes offer expanded abilities:

- 640 x 200 mode, with 2 out of 16 colors per 8x1 pixels. The Profi offers a similar mode, but the ATM can use the full 16 colour set for both ink and paper.
- 320 x 200 mode with a 16 colours raster mode (a two-pixel chunky mode, not planar like EGA). Two games for this mode were converted directly from PC: Prince of Persia and Goblins, and one from Sony PlayStation: Time Gal. Other games that use this mode exist, like Ball Quest, released in August, 2006.

Palette:

- 16 colors from a 64 color palette (6-bit RGB) can be set for all modes.

=== Operating systems ===
48K Sinclair BASIC, 128K Sinclair BASIC, TR-DOS, CP/M, iS-DOS, TASiS, DNA OS, Mr Gluk Reset Service.

=== Software ===
- ATM Turbo
- Virtual TR-DOS

== Models ==
Many models exist. Models before version 6.00 are called ATM 1, later models are called ATM 2(2+) or ATM Turbo 2(2+) or simply Turbo 2+. An IDE interface is available since v6.00.JIO0UBH9BY8B9T7GVC6R (the latest model is 7.18).

=== ATM Turbo 1 (1991) ===
Features:

- Processor: Zilog Z80 at 3.5 and 7 MHz (turbo mode)
- RAM: 128 to 512 KB
- ROM: 64 to 128 KB
- Memory manager: standard for ZX Spectrum 128 (memory over 64KB is addressed through a window in the upper 16KB of address space), with the ability to include a zero page of RAM in the lower 16KB of the address space
- Graphics video modes: Standard ZX Spectrum mode (256x192, 2 colors per block of 8x8 pixels from 16 colors); 320x200 with 16 colors per pixel; 640x200 high resolution mode with 2 out of 16 colors per 8x1 pixels
- Color palette: 64 colors, 16 can be used at the same time
- Firmware: 48K BASIC / 128K BASIC; TR-DOS; CP/M 2.2
- Supported external drives: tape recorder (audio cassette); disk drive
- Sound devices: standard 1-bit beeper; AY-3-8910; Covox
- Additional devices: SECAM encoder for connection to a color TV; single-channel DAC; modem; parallel interface for connecting a printer; stereo audio amplifier (2x1W)
- Keyboard: mechanical matrix, standard ZX Spectrum layout (40 keys) or extended (64 keys)

=== ATM Turbo 2 (1993) ===
New features (relative to ATM Turbo 1):

- Memory manager: the ability to include any page of RAM or ROM in any of the quarters of the address space
- Text mode: 80x25 text video mode, characters are stored in the character generator ROM. It is possible to set any of 16 colors for the symbol and background
- Hardware vertical scrolling in 320x200 and 640x200 modes
- Supported external drives: controller for IDE devices (hard drives of any capacity, CD-ROM ); Digital PLL added to floppy controller
- Additional devices: eight-channel DAC
- Keyboard: XT keyboard support, on-chip RAM 537RU10
- Removed: SECAM encoder

=== ATM Turbo 2+ ===
New features (comparing to ATM Turbo 2):

- RAM: 128 to 1024 KB
- Additional devices: RS-232 interface; channel switch for DAC
- Keyboard: support for XT and AT keyboards, based on the 1816BE31 (i8031) microcontroller
- The xBIOS ROM has been specially developed for ATM Turbo 2+ with support for virtual floppies
- ROM version of Mr Gluk Reset Service
- Removed: Modem

=== ZX Evolution ===
New features (comparing to ATM Turbo 2+):

- Turbo mode up to 14 MHz, switchable via menu and software
- RAM: 4MB
- 2 expansion slots according to the ZXBUS standard, for connecting General Sound, etc.
- Flexible architecture based on FPGA (EP1K50) - third-party firmware available
- SD card with transparent BIOS support (EVO RESET SERVICE)
- Added VGA video output
- Non-volatile clock according to Mr Gluk standard, IDE interface according to Nemo standard, mouse according to Kempston Mouse standard
- Video scan rate similar to that of the Pentagon, with full support of border and multicolor effects
