= Scorpion ZS-256 =

ZX Spectrum clone

- Manufacturer: Scorpion
- Released: 1991; 35 years ago
- Discontinued: 1996; 30 years ago
- Operating system: Sinclair BASIC, TR-DOS, CP/M and iS-DOS
- CPU: Z80B @ 3.5 MHz
- Memory: 256 KiB
- Storage: Hard drive
- Removable storage: Floppy discs, cassette tape
- Display: 256x192
- Sound: Beeper, AY-3-8912
- Backward compatibility: ZX Spectrum 128

Scorpion ZS-256 Turbo+
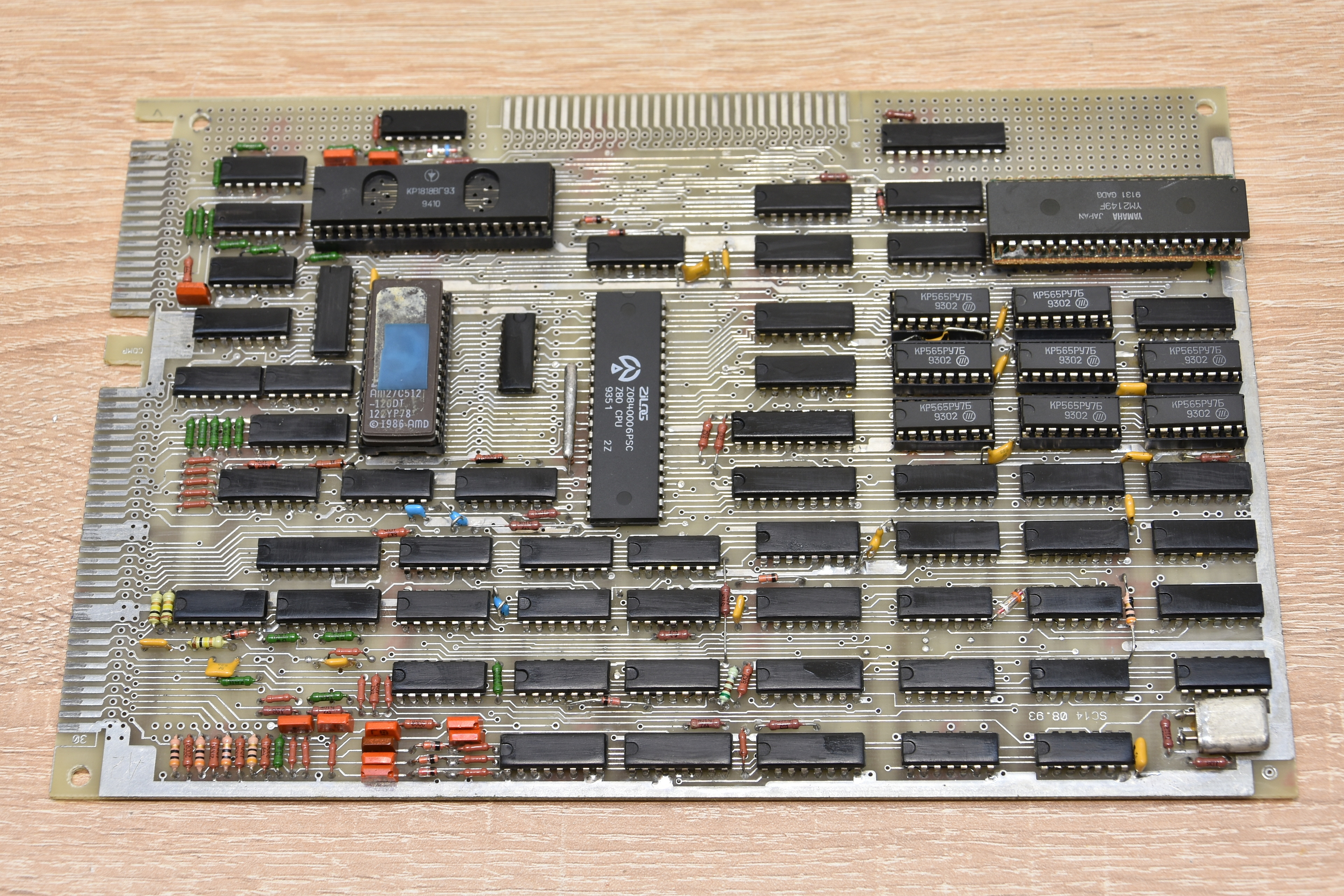
- Manufacturer: Scorpion
- Released: 1996; 30 years ago
- Discontinued: 2000; 26 years ago
- Operating system: Sinclair BASIC, TR-DOS, CP/M and iS-DOS
- CPU: Z80B @ 7.0 MHz
- Memory: 256 KiB
- Storage: Hard drive
- Removable storage: Floppy discs, cassette tape
- Display: 256x192
- Sound: Beeper, AY-3-8912
- Backward compatibility: ZX Spectrum 128

The Scorpion ZS-256 was a very widespread ZX Spectrum clone produced in St. Petersburg by Sergey Zonov (same person behind the "Leningrad" clone).

Introduced in 1991, it was fitted with a Zilog Z80B processor, a AY-3-8910 sound chip, whilst RAM memory options ranged from 256 to 1024 KB.

The computer was usually assembled in a mini tower configuration with a standard IBM power supply, allowing the connection of peripherals, drives, etc. Various expansions were produced, including SMUC – an adapter for IDE and ISA slots, which allowed the use of IBM PC compatible hard drives and expansion cards.

The Shadow Service Monitor (debugger) in the BASIC ROM was activated by pressing the Magic Button (NMI). There was also the option of fitting the machine with a ProfROM which included such software as a clock, hard disk utilities, and the ZX-Word text editor. The computer can work with TR-DOS, CP/M and iS-DOS systems.

In 1996, the Scorpion ZS-256 Turbo+ version was introduced, featuring a "turbo" mode (7 MHz instead of the original's 3.50 MHz), IDE Controller, CMOS, interrupt controller, ISA8 slot, as part of the SMUC expansion card., expansion board 101-key PC type keyboard, 3.5" floppy disk drive and a XTR modem (allowing access to ZX Net and FidoNet).

Extension kit Scorpion GMX (Graphic Memory eXpander) for Scorpion ZS-256 Turbo+, comes with 2MB of RAM and can emulate other clones like the Pentagon 128. It has new graphics modes: 640 x 200 with 16 colors; 80x25 character text mode.

Production of Spectrum-compatible computers ceased in 1998, with the Scorpion company focusing on the sale of IBM PC-compatibles and office equipment.

== Versions ==
- Scorpion ZS-256 (1991)
- Scorpion ZS-256 Turbo+ (1996)
- Extension kit Scorpion GMX for Scorpion ZS-256 Turbo+ (1998)

== Upgrades from the original ZX Spectrum 48/128K ==
- RAM 256 KB (GMX kit 2 MB)
- ROM 64 KB (GMX kit 512 KB);
- Additional GMX video modes: 640 x 200 with 16 colors; 80 x 25 character text mode.
- IDE Controller, CMOS, interrupt controller, ISA8 slot, as part of the SMUC expansion card.
- "Turbo Mode" that clocks the CPU up to 7 MHz
- Shadow Service Monitor (debugger) in ROM
- AY8910/12 sound chip
- Built-in printer interface (Centronics and RS232C);
- Expansion board IBM PC keyboard and mouse controller
- TR-DOS, CP/M and iS-DOS systems
- Built-in XTR modem (ZX Net, FidoNet)
