= Turbo boost =

Turbo boost or Turbo Boost may refer to:

- Turbocharger boost, the amount by which intake manifold pressure exceeds atmospheric pressure in a turbocharger
- Intel Turbo Boost, a technology that enables a processor to run above its base operating frequency
- Turbo boost, a feature of the fictional vehicle KITT in the Knight Rider TV series

== See also ==
- Turbo button, a button on a PC which provides two run states for the computer, normal (full) speed, or a reduced speed
