= ZX Spectrum Vega =

Video game console

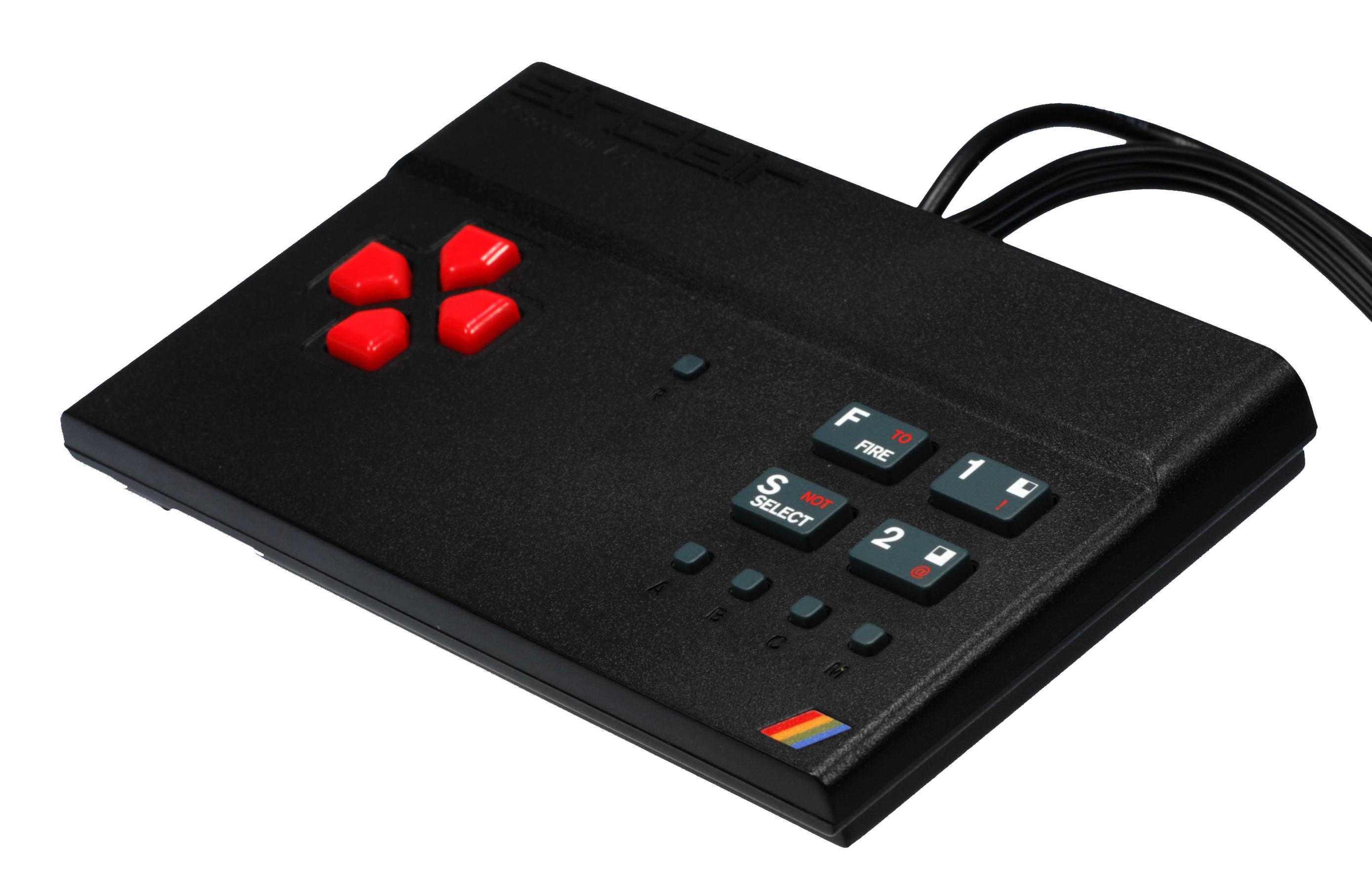
- The ZX Spectrum Vega
- Developer: Retro Computers
- Manufacturer: Retro Computers
- Type: Home video game console
- Generation: Eighth generation
- Released: April 24, 2015
- Media: Internal flash memory, Micro SD card

The ZX Spectrum Vega is a modern redesign of the ZX Spectrum in the form of a miniaturised TV game, created with the involvement of Sir Clive Sinclair. It comes preloaded with a thousand games.

== Hardware ==
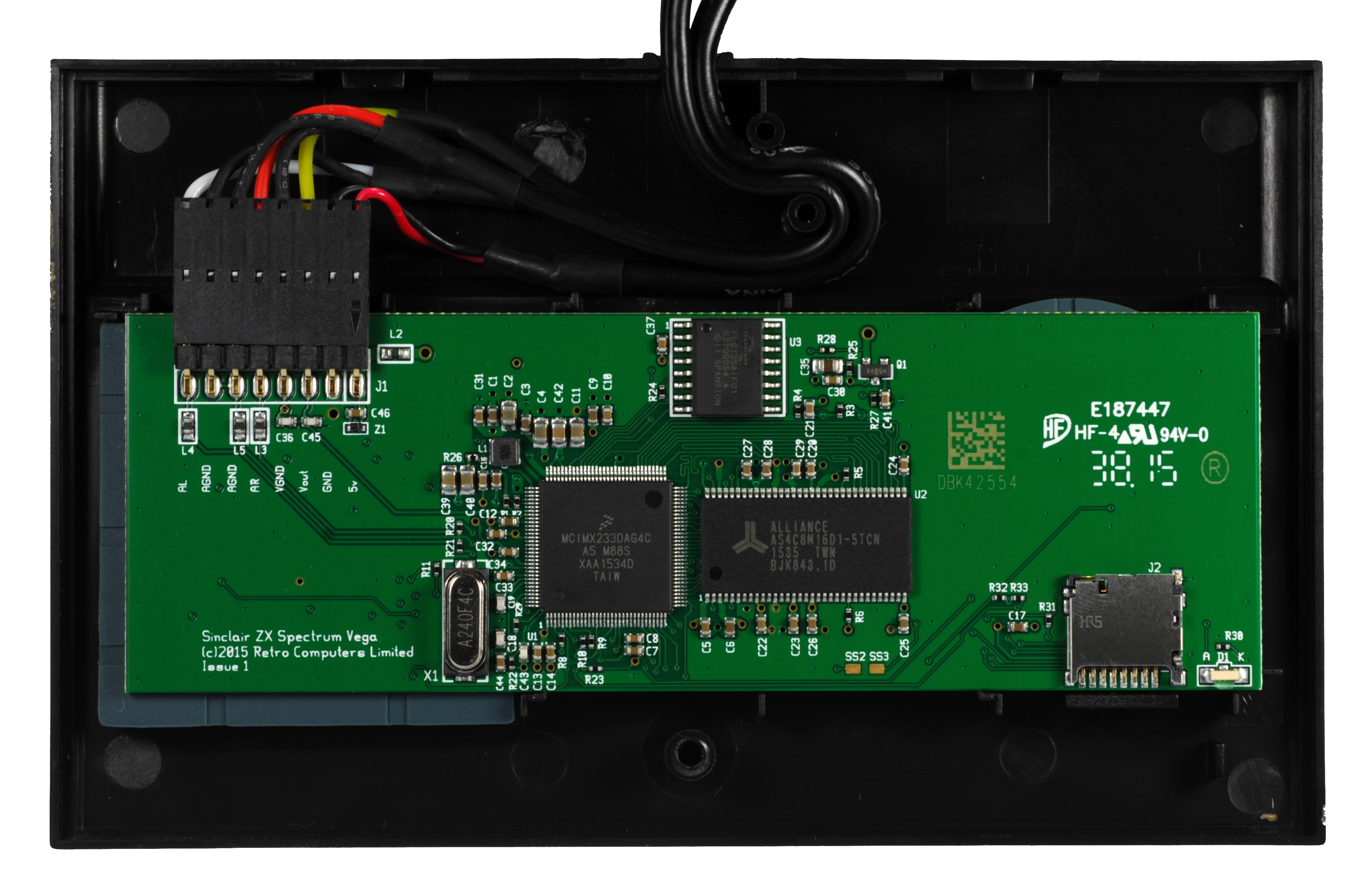
Motherboard of the console

The Vega mimics the look of the original 48k Spectrum computer. However, the keyboard that consisted of 40 rubber keys has been replaced in favour of a simplified layout comprising only 13 buttons. On the left is a segmented directional pad made of hard red plastic for movement. On the right are four grey rectangular rubber keys that are the same size and shape as the original keys, alongside four smaller square rubber buttons on the bottom. In the centre lies the reset button. The iconic rainbow strip that appeared on the bottom right corner of the original has been reduced to a small decal on the corner.

The console connects to the television via an RCA composite cable and uses a USB cable to draw power. Both cables are hardwired to the back of the console. Since the console is meant to be held like a controller, the size of the unit has been reduced to fit in the hands, and the cables measure around 3 metres so it can be comfortably used with some distance between the screen and the user.

On the front, it contains a green LED to indicate the power is on, and a micro SD card slot for adding save files and more titles.

== Software ==
The ZX Spectrum Vega comes pre-loaded with 1000 games.

== History ==
In 2014, a £100 Sinclair ZX Spectrum Vega retro video game console was announced by Retro Computers and crowdfunded on IndieGogo, with the apparent backing of Clive Sinclair as an investor, but without a full keyboard and manufactured in a limited capacity.

It was released on 24 April 2015.

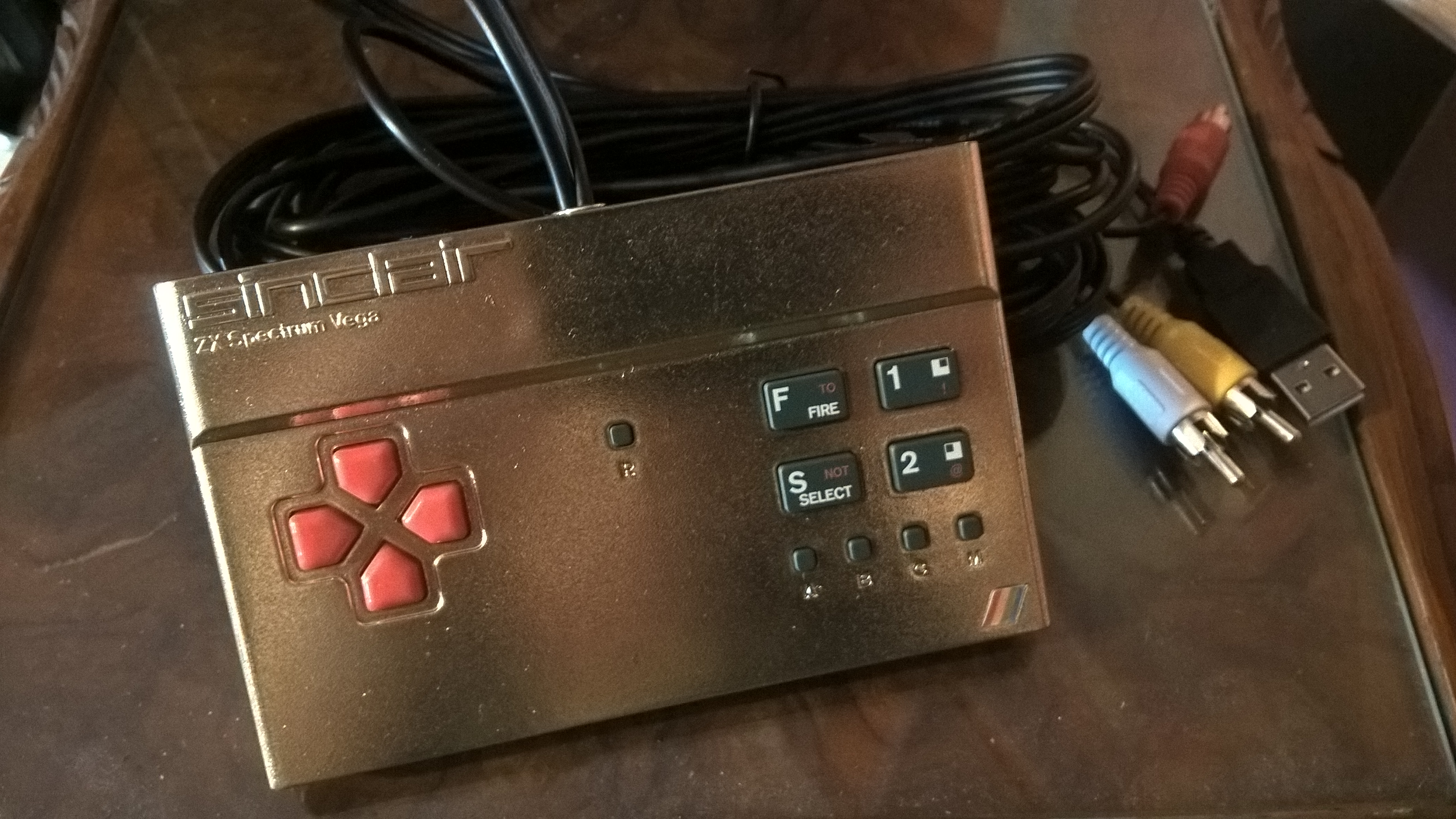
Limited Edition Gold ZX Spectrum Vega Console

Also, there was a gold Limited Edition Sinclair ZX Spectrum Vega Made in 2015; only 16 of these consoles were ever made, with 4 of them being backups/spares and 12 of them for a cancelled competition that was to be Held by Sir Clive Sinclair and Retro computers Limited in a Willy Wonka-style campaign where golden tickets were to be given out.

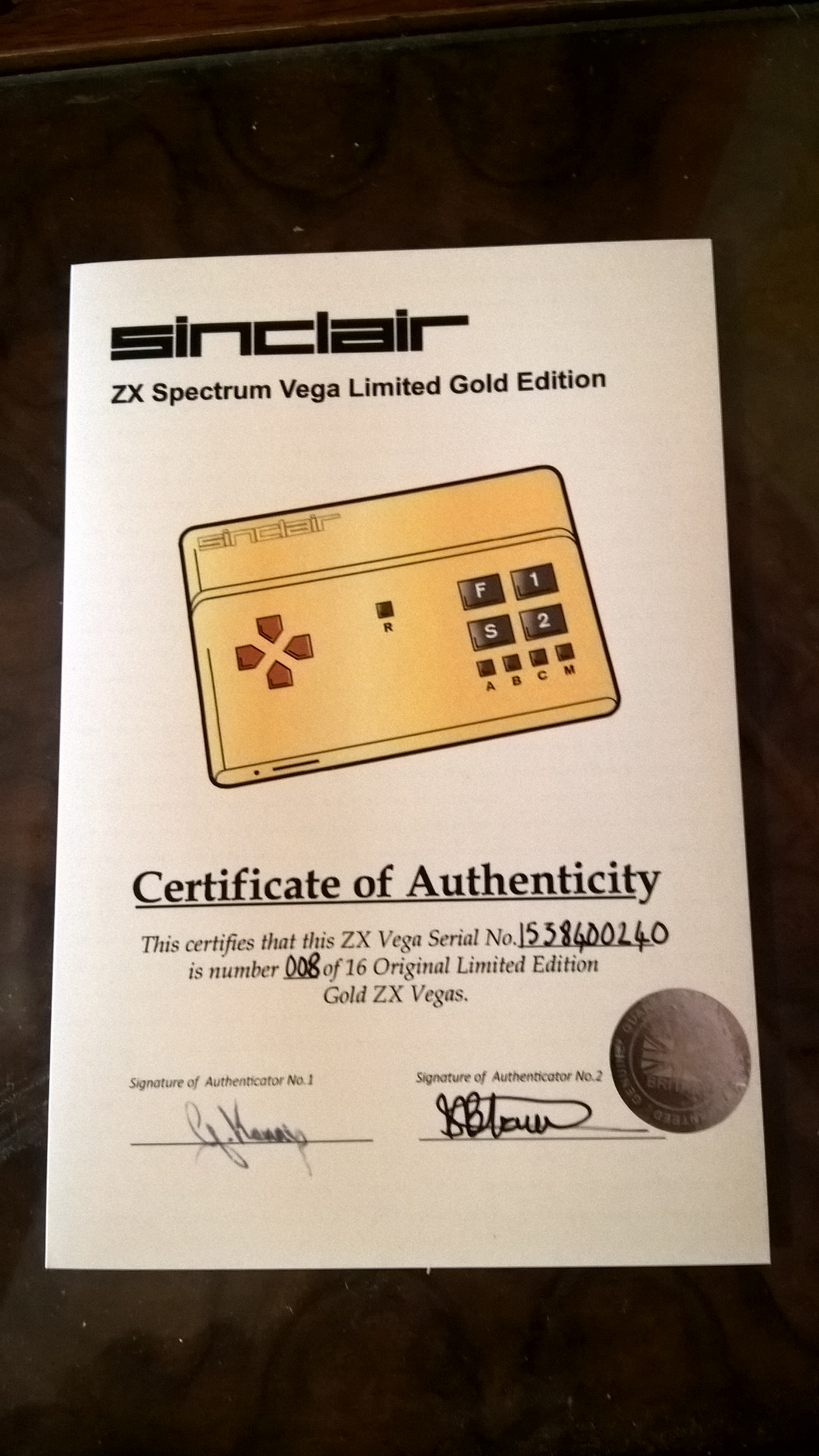
Certificate of Authenticity number 8 of 16 Authenticated by Levy Blaw and Graham Kenny

== See also ==
- ZX Spectrum Vega+
- ZX Spectrum Next
