= ZX Spectrum graphic modes =

Graphic modes of the ZX Spectrum computer

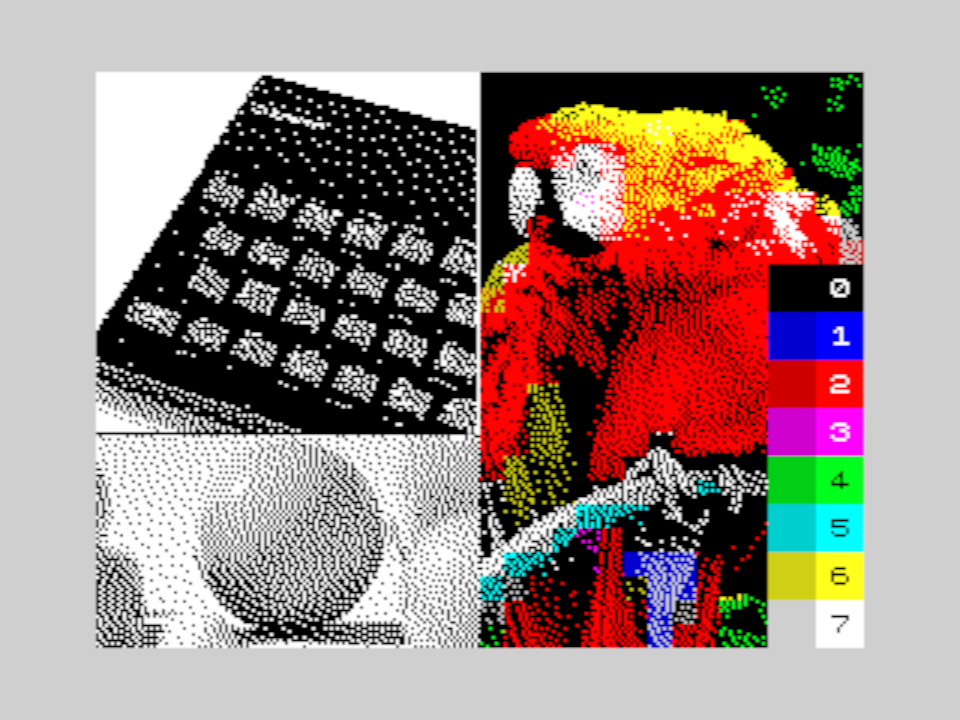
Simulation of ZX Spectrum graphics output on a PAL TV set

The original ZX Spectrum computer produces a one bit per pixel, bitmapped colour graphics video output. A composite video signal is generated through an RF modulator, and was designed for use with contemporary 1980s television sets.

The image size of the framebuffer is 256 × 192 pixels, with a fixed palette of 15 saturated colours. Each block of 8 × 8 pixels is limited to two colours. The low colour resolution conserved memory, totaling just 768 bytes for colour attributes. Colour is stored separate from the pixel bitmap, as a 32 × 24 cell grid, using one byte per each of the character cells.

Since the machine was designed for usage with a standard television set, the 256 × 192 pixel area is surrounded by a wide border that fills up the remaining space of the standard 384 × 288 quarter-resolution of 625-line TV screen area. Usually, the border area assumes a single colour, but using software tricks, it is possible to display some low-resolution graphics there.

The ZX Spectrum lacked dedicated hardware for scrolling and sprites, or a dedicated hardware blitter. To facilitate the display of colour graphics, the original ZX Spectrum employs 16 KiB of discrete graphics RAM. The latency of the graphics RAM is 150 ns; the peak bandwidth is 2.1875 MB/s (calculated as 224 × 5/8 bytes per 64 μs).

== Frame rate and timings ==
The original ZX Spectrum does not conform strictly to the PAL standard frame rate of 50 Hz. ZX Spectrum outputs one video line in exactly 224 CPU clock cycles, where the CPU clock rate equals 3.5 MHz. This exactly matches the PAL standard 64 μs line time. However, the ZX Spectrum produces only 312 lines to form one display frame, while the 625-line PAL standard recommends 312.5 lines. As a consequence, the frame rate of the ZX Spectrum is approximately 50.08 frames per second.

This discrepancy was not known to many programmers, who assumed the frame rate of 50 frames per second. As a result, some programs, including the built-in BASIC interpreter, had the time running slightly too fast. Later ZX Spectrum models have a slightly different frame rate and the CPU clock rate, which causes some older software to run slightly too slow if it uses vertical synchronization, or too fast if it relies on CPU clock rate.

At the start of each display frame, the maskable interrupt signal is sent to the ZX Spectrum's Z80 CPU, enabling programs to easily detect and measure the passage of time. It also allows the programs to perfectly synchronise the graphics output with the display of video frames. It is exactly the same mechanism as the vertical synchronization of a modern computer, which can be employed to prevent display tearing.

Display timings on PAL
	ZX Spectrum 16K, 48K, and ZX Spectrum+	128K, +2, +2A, +3
CPU cycles per PAL line	224	228
PAL line time	64 μs	64.28 μs
PAL lines per frame	312	311
Frame time	19.968 ms	19.9915 ms
Frame rate	50.08 frames per second	50.02 frames per second
Display vertical synchronization	available, by the Z80 maskable interrupt line (INT)	

== Graphics memory structure and pixel coordinates ==
The 16 KiB discrete graphics RAM is directly accessible to the CPU at addresses 16384 to 32767. The RAM chips for graphics are connected to both the CPU and to the video circuit in the ULA. The main pixel bitmap is stored at the very beginning of the graphics RAM, followed by the attributes array at the immediately higher addresses. The entire frame buffer is 6912 bytes in size, and consists of the pixel bitmap followed by the attributes array. The remaining part of the 16 KiB graphics RAM is not used by the video circuitry.

The video controller circuit is built into the semi-custom Ferranti ULA integrated circuit, consisting of approximately 480 configurable cells (depending on the model). The cells of the ULA were factory-configured in various ways to produce the ULA for ZX Spectrum, where one cell has the functionality of approximately two NAND gates.

A CPU access to the graphics RAM is called a contended access, because the video controller has a higher priority than the CPU. On an access to the graphics RAM, the CPU commonly incurs a slight delay while waiting for the video controller to complete the data reads.

The addresses in the video DRAM are interleaved, which produces an unusual coordinate system for the pixel bitmap. If coordinates of a pixel are (x, y), and the bits of the x coordinate axis are labeled x7, x6, x5, x4, x3, x2, x1, x0, and the bits of the y coordinate axis are labeled y7, y6, y5, y4, y3, y2, y1, y0, then the pixel is stored in a byte with the address bitpattern 0, 1, 0, y7, y6, y2, y1, y0, y5, y4, y3, x7, x6, x5, x4, x3.

The address bitpattern contains two more bitpattern transpositions than necessary. The fastest and the simplest bitpattern would have been 0, 1, 0, x7, x6, x5, x4, x3, y7, y6, y5, y4, y3, y2, y1, y0, which makes the pixel addresses increase by the column first. Unfortunately, the ZX Spectrum designers were working under extreme time pressure, and failed to notice this simple improvement.

While the original ZX Spectrum 48K model has 32 KiB of main RAM, the 16K model has just the 16 KiB graphics RAM. This is the reason why the colour attributes array was designed to fit in just 768 bytes. The colour attributes could have easily had a double or a quadruple resolution in the vertical axis, but that would have reduced the remaining free memory space for programs by another kilobyte or two, especially in the 16 KiB model.

To facilitate the display of colour graphics, the original ZX Spectrum employs 16 KiB of discrete graphics RAM, unlike the shared graphics RAM architectures of most other microcomputers, including the Commodore 64. The resolution of the pixel bitmap is similar to that in other contemporary microcomputers, where the popular Commodore 64 commonly uses the 160 × 200 resolution at two bits per pixel.

The system of colour cells, called "the attributes", drew a lot of criticism, because it significantly complicated the programming of colour applications. Still, the colour attribute system had sufficient capabilities for supporting the common applications and games of the era, and even the very limited colour capabilities were welcomed by the users.

== Colour palette ==
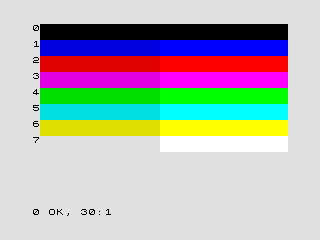
ZX Spectrum screen showing the available colours

The ZX Spectrum (and compatibles) computers uses a variation of the 4-bit RGBI palette philosophy (also used on CGA, Thomson MO5, Sharp MZ-800, Mattel Aquarius, etc.), resulting in 8 basic colours with brightness variations. On the 128, +2 and +3 models, the ULA outputs TTL level red, green, blue and sync signals that are used by the TEA2000 Video Encoder for composite video signal generation.

Each of the colours of the 3-bit palette has a basic and a bright variant. The bright half of the palette is generated using the video display's maximum voltage level for the luminance signal. The basic half of the palette is generated by simply reducing the voltage of the luminance signal.

Both colours of a character cell must share their brightness property, because there is only a single brightness bit for the entire cell. Besides that limitation, any combination of the palette colours can be freely selected as the two colours of a character cell. In the following table, all the "bright" colours are given in the right column.

Colour number	Binary value				Colour name	Binary value				Colour name
Colour number	G	R	B	I	Colour name	G	R	B	I	Colour name
0	0	0	0	0	Black	0	0	0	1	"Bright" black
1	0	0	1	0	Blue	0	0	1	1	Bright blue
2	0	1	0	0	Red	0	1	0	1	Bright red
3	0	1	1	0	Magenta	0	1	1	1	Bright magenta
4	1	0	0	0	Green	1	0	0	1	Bright green
5	1	0	1	0	Cyan	1	0	1	1	Bright cyan
6	1	1	0	0	Yellow	1	1	0	1	Bright yellow
7	1	1	1	0	White	1	1	1	1	Bright white

- Some ZX Spectrum clones or NTSC machines might display "bright black" as dark grey or brown.
- The luminance of colours in the table is relative, not absolute. The common television sets usually had much higher luminance than the standard sRGB LCD luminance of 80 cd/m^{2}. In absolute terms, ZX Spectrum's colours are much brighter than the sRGB colours in the table. ZX Spectrum's "white" colour is as bright as the brightest sRGB white colour, while the "bright white" exceeds the limits of the standard sRGB colour luminance.
- The given sRGB values for green, yellow and cyan are only best approximations, because sRGB displays are unable to produce all the colours of the PAL TV standard. The green PAL phosphor is out-of-gamut in the sRGB colour-space of the modern common LCD displays. For most purposes, this colour inaccuracy is small.
- Colours simulated as sRGB assume non-bright as 85% voltage (0.55 V) and bright as 100% (0.65 V). Each ZX Spectrum model used different voltages for colours, so the values here are only indicative. The colours were computed by a conversion of the PAL TV colour-space into the sRGB colour-space. The PAL gamma of 2.8 was applied as recommended by the BT.470 PAL standard; the conversion of primary colours to sRGB primaries (by IEC 61966-2-1 sRGB standard), and the standard sRGB gamma correction (by inverse EOTF) was applied.
- The given colours are probably not the real ZX Spectrum colours. The colour approximations were computed by assuming the maximum possible saturation that a ZX Spectrum can produce on the PAL TV output. The real ZX Spectrum colours are currently unknown, and they are probably less saturated. To compute the real ZX Spectrum colours, a measurement of the phase-amplitude shift of the chroma sub-carrier has to be performed, for each colour, by an oscilloscope on the ZX Spectrum's PAL output.

In the ZX Spectrum encoding, the colour components are in the GRB (green, red, blue) order, rather than the more common RGB order. The GRB order has the advantage that the colour numbers become ordered by increasing luminance, so if viewed on black-and-white display, the ordered sequence forms a gradient from black to white.

All the colour properties of a cell are stored in memory as one byte called the attribute. Counting from least to most significant bit, an attribute byte dedicates three bits for colour of the pixels valued 1, three bits for colour of the pixels valued 0, one bit for the brightness flag, and one bit for the flashing effect. The flashing effect causes the displayed foreground and background colours to alternate every 0.64 seconds.

Most current ZX Spectrum emulators are displaying inaccurate and possibly over-saturated colours. Those colours were computed by simplistic approximations that do not take into account many subtleties of the PAL-to-sRGB colour-space conversion. Similarly, on the ZX Art website the usage of inaccurate colours is very common. The theoretically impossible sRGB colour #00CD00 is commonly used as the ZX Spectrum's green colour (i.e. the Spectrum's real green colour is probably more bluish).

=== BASIC commands for colours ===
The two colours of a character cell are called the foreground colour and the background colour. For any value of n from 0 to 7, the following Sinclair BASIC commands can be used to set or alter the colours of a cell:

- PAPER n, the background colour for the character cell; applied to all pixels of value 0 in the cell
- INK n, the foreground colour for the character cell; applied to all pixels of value 1 in the cell
- BRIGHT i, selects the value of the brightness bit of the character cell, where the value can be either 0 or 1

Additionally, the BORDER command selects a colour for the screen area surrounding the pixel bitmap. It does not use a brightness flag, thus only the eight basic colours are supported for the border colour.

== Standard mode ==
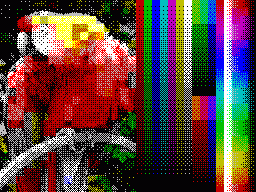
Standard ZX Spectrum screen, with attribute blocks clearly visible

The original ZX Spectrum has a screen resolution of 256 × 192 pixels. In all cases, colours are extremely saturated. Colour information is overlaid onto this as a grid of 8 × 8 pixel regions known as attribute blocks. All colour properties of an attribute block are stored in memory as a single attribute byte, and each attribute block matches one character cell. Within each attribute block, only two colours may be used out of a palette of 8 colours. Additionally, the entire attribute block may be designated as "bright", resulting in a total of 15 possible colours (black has no "bright" variation). In many programs, this limitation of only two colours per attribute block is evident as the unwanted effect of attribute clash.

A screen in this mode occupies 6144 bytes for the pixel bitmap, totaling 6912 bytes together with the colour attributes.

Details:

Pixels: 256 × 192
Attributes: 32 × 24
Colours: 15 (counting non-bright and bright)
Machine: All

Standard-mode gallery
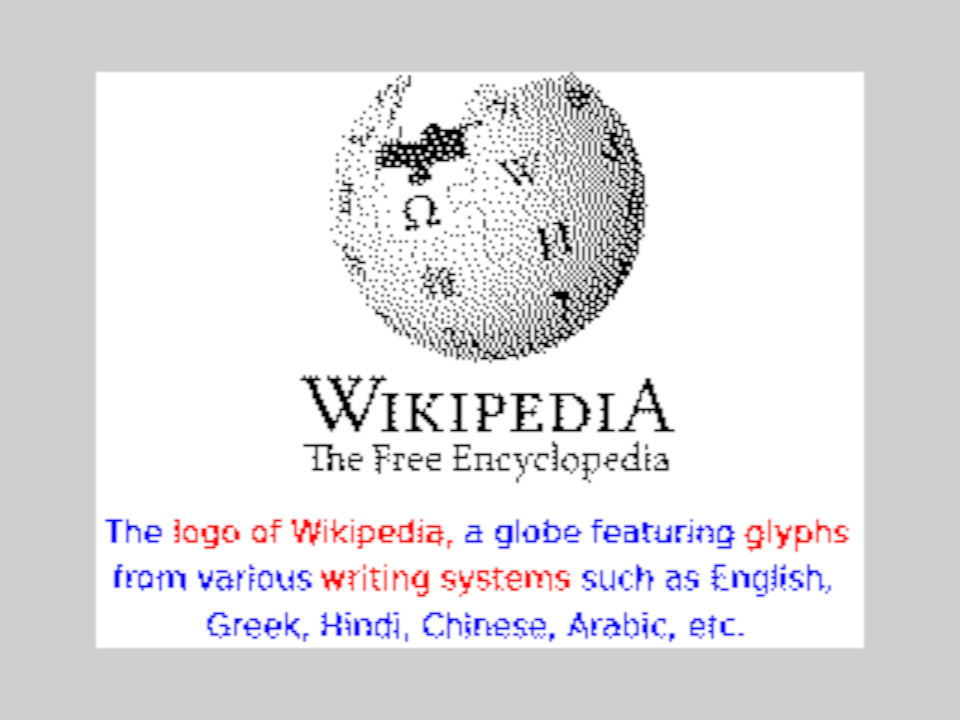
Wikipedia logo

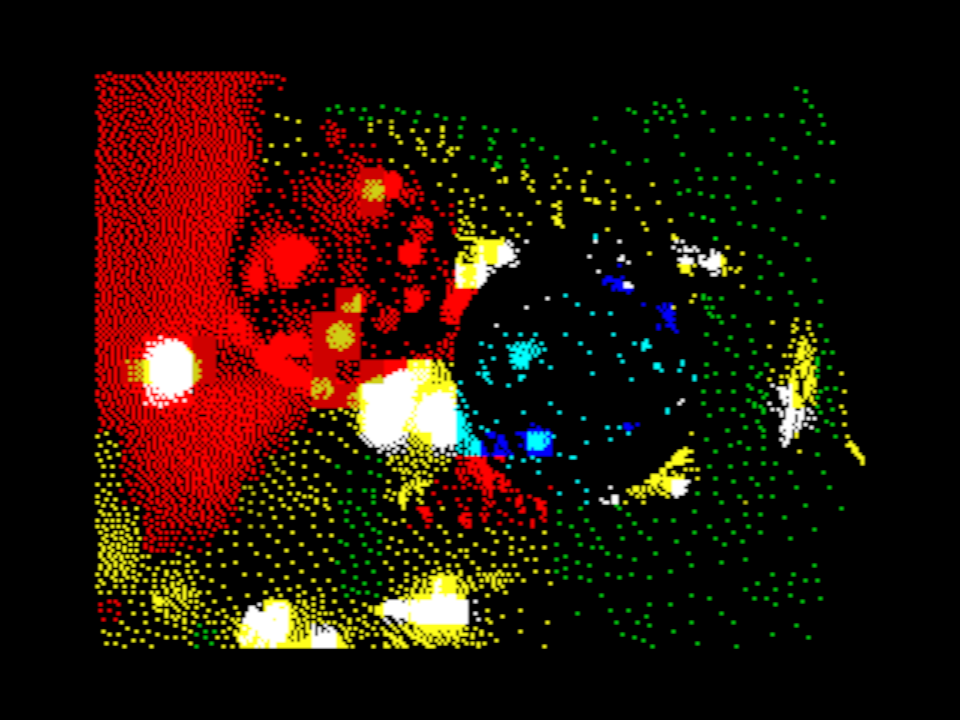
New Year tree

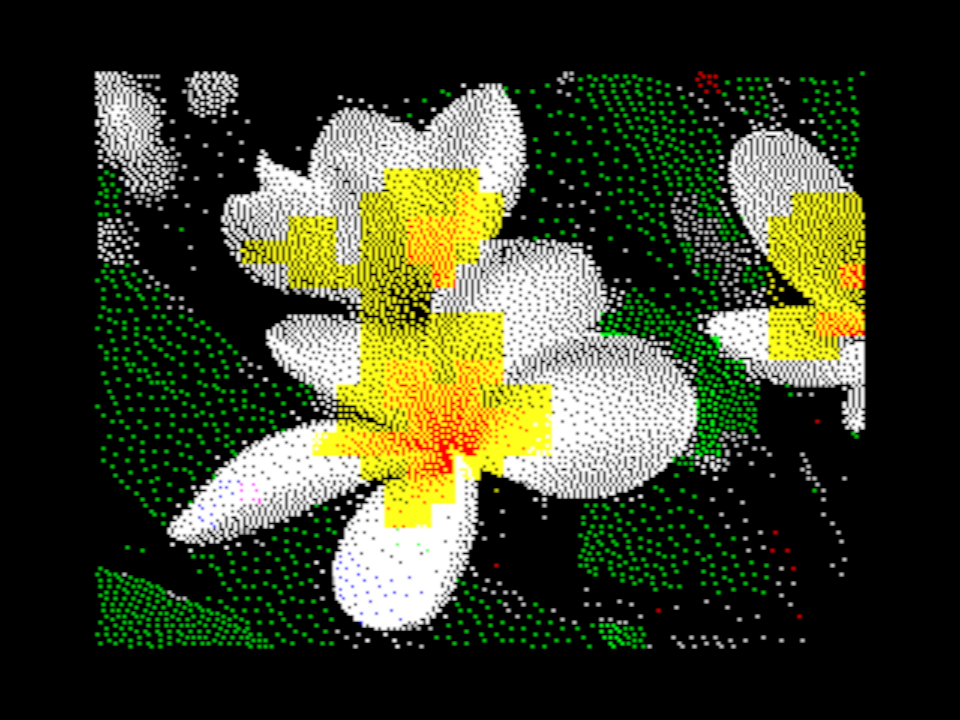
Flowers

=== Monochrome TVs and monitors ===
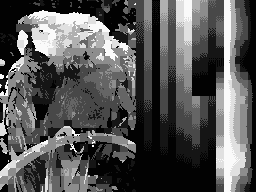
ZX Spectrum on a monochrome display

By using a monochrome monitor or black-and-white TV (or reducing the saturation settings of a colour TV), it is possible to take advantage of the differences in intensity over the Spectrum's colour range to generate a 15-shade greyscale image at 256 × 192 resolution.

Details:

Pixels: 256 × 192
Attributes: 32 × 24
Colours: 15 greyscale
Machine: All, using a monochrome display

== Hardware Hi-Colour ==
Several third-party Spectrum clones, including the Timex Sinclair machines, the Pentagon, the eLeMeNt ZX, and the MB03+ Ultimate interface support a screen mode named Hi-Colour, in which attribute blocks are 8 × 1 pixels in size rather than the usual 8 × 8. A screen in this mode takes 12 KB RAM. In the case of the Timex, this mode is activated through the command OUT 255,2. At least one editor for Timex machines supports this mode. In addition, this screen mode can be generated through the use of the MB-02 disk system's DMA hardware (where the technique is known as Multitech), and is also available as Mode 2 (with a linear byte order) on the SAM Coupé.

- Pixels: 256 × 192
- Attributes: 32 × 192
- Colours: 15
- Machine: Timex Sinclair models, ZX Spectrum Next, Pentagon, eLeMeNt ZX, SAM Coupé
- Interface: MB03+ Ultimate

== Software Hi-Colour ==
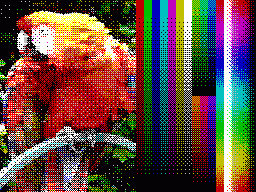
8 × 1 attributes, 1 × 1 pixels example image

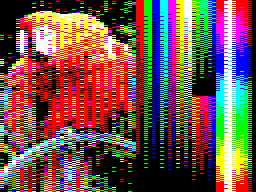
8 × 1 attributes, 4 × 1 pixels example image

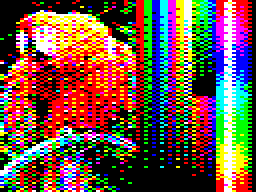
8 × 2 attributes, 4 × 2 pixels example image

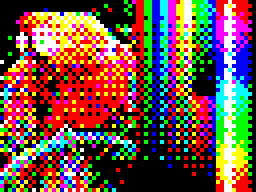
8 × 4 attributes, 4 × 4 pixels example image

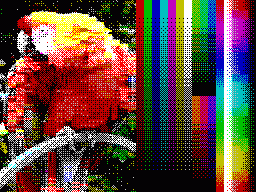
8 × 2 attributes, 1 × 1 pixels example image

On other Spectrum models, this effect can be replicated by exploiting the fact that the ULA re-reads the attribute information on every pixel row when generating the video output; it is possible to write a new value to the relevant memory location in between successive lines, and thus cause a different pair of colours to be shown. However, the Spectrum's processor is not fast enough to write to an entire row of attribute bytes in one scanline, so 8 × 1 attributes can only be achieved over 20 columns. This technique is variously known as Hicolour, Multicolour, FLI, BIFROST*2, SuperColour, Rainbow Generator or Rainbow Processor mode.

- Pixels: 256 × 192
- Attributes: 32 × 192 (limited to a 18 × 192 area)
- Colours: 15
- Machine: All (with specific code tailored for each machine's timings)

A variation on this method is to change the row of attributes over the course of two scanlines, resulting in 8 × 2 pixel attribute blocks over a wider region of the screen. This mode is known as Bicolour, and can be applied to the full width of the screen through the use of the Nirvana+ engine.

- Pixels: 256 × 192
- Attributes: 32 × 96
- Colours: 15
- Machine: All (with specific code tailored for each machine's timings)

A special case involves alternating between the two available colours per attribute cell for 4 pixels each, allowing each 4 × 1 region to be treated as an independently colourable "pixel" (although the limitation of one brightness level per 8 × 1 cell is still in effect). Again, a 4 × 2 variant of this mode can be applied to a wider region of the screen. And a 4 × 4 variant can be achieved on 128K machines by timed switches between the two video RAMs (rather than re-writing the attribute data), to display the upper half of the character cells from one screen and the lower half from the other.

- Pixels: 64 × 192; 64 × 96; 64 × 48
- Attributes: 8 × 1 brightness limitation
- Colours: 15
- Machine: All (with specific code tailored for each machine's timings)

== ULAplus / HAM256 / HAM8×1 ==
ULAplus is compatible with the standard ZX Spectrum and Timex Hi-Res and Hi-Colour modes, and adds the ability to redefine the palette. If only used to slight modify the basic 16 colours, ULAplus software can be displayed on a standard Spectrum. Use of the full 64 colours is incompatible, as it will trigger the "flash" attributes of the original Spectrum. Amiga HAM inspired modes are also possible (HAM256 and HAM8×1), displaying up to 256 colours on screen.

Details:

Pixels: 256 × 192; 512 × 192 (Hi-Res mode)
Attributes: 32 × 24; 32 × 192 (8×1 Hi-Colour mode)
Colours: 2 from 256 (Hi-Res mode), 64 from 256; 256 (HAM256 and HAM8×1)
Machine: ZX Spectrum SE, ZX Spectrum Next, ZX-Uno, Chloe 280SE, Chloe 140SE, eLeMeNt ZX, zx128u+, The Spectrum
Interface: MB03+ Ultimate

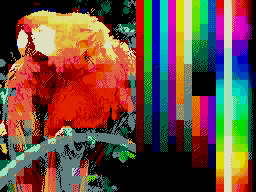
ULAplus example image

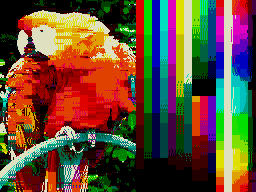
ULAplus 8×1 Hi-Colour example image

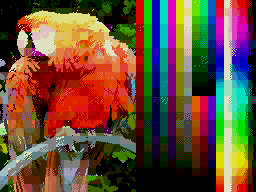
ULAplus HAM256 example image

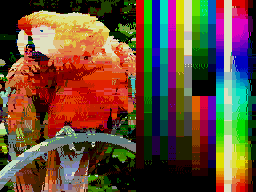
ULAplus HAM8×1 example image

== Interlace/switched modes ==
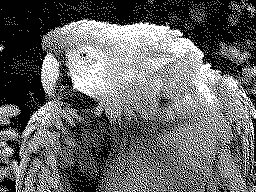
Theoretical simulation of how an interlaced ZX Spectrum image would look like on a CRT screen

=== Interlace ===
The Timex clones and ZX Spectrum 128K implement a "shadow" screen area, which can be switched into place through the use of a single OUT command, and this is often utilised to rapidly switch between two images for this purpose (although this can also be achieved with a standard block copy, albeit not over the entire screen).

It was theorised that, by alternating between two screens on every frame interrupt (50 Hz), it should be possible to simulate a doubling of the vertical display resolution from 192 to 384 lines. However, when viewed on a CRT television screen (the standard at the time), even though the flicker is less noticeable than on a modern monitor it's still too prominent to accomplish the desired effect. And example image is linked here (warning: the linked image flickers very rapidly, which could potentially cause seizures in people with photosensitive epilepsy).

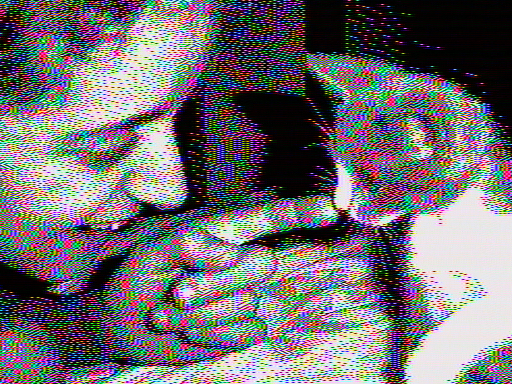
Interlaced highres monochrome ZX Spectrum image. Real picture taken from a Sinclair ZX Spectrum +3 using composite output and a PCI capture card.

The technique does not in fact achieve a true interlaced display, as the Spectrum lacks the ability to synchronise with the display hardware at such a low level. Theoretically, on a CRT television screen with a phosphor persistence higher than real-life hardware, the effect would have looked more akin to anti-aliasing, with certain pixels appearing at half intensity.

However, on modern LCD TVs, capture cards, or other devices that convert the original analog signal into digital (thus partially ignoring the original timing signals), this mode can be interpreted as true interlace and display the screen as intended, as shown on the image featuring a cat, at the right.

Details:

Pixels: 256 × 384
Attributes: 32 × 24
Colours: 15

=== GigaScreen / DithVIDE / BZither ===
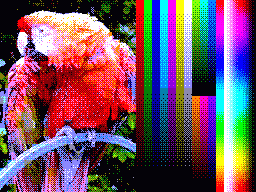
Theoretical simulation of how a GigaScreen ZX Spectrum image would look like on a CRT screen

The attributes (colours) of an image are alternated at 50 Hz on the screen, with the intent of achieving a palette increase of approximately 36 colours if the phosphor's persistence was high enough to blend concurrent frames, but in reality the flicker is again too noticeable on CRT displays to achieve the effect. It's possible to switch screen per scanline and thus mix the screens, but this is very CPU-intensive and needs exact and steady timings.

With real T-state precise software, its possible to simulate a GigaScreen on an 128K "toastrack" original ZX Spectrum 128K.

For Pentagon machines, a hardware modification is available, which directly combines the two alternate screen areas into the video signal, thus eliminating the flicker associated with this method. The MB03+ Ultimate interface and the eLeMeNt ZX computer can display three hardware modes of non-flickering GigaScreen (mixed video RAMs, mixed video frames and autodetection mode) in 256 × 192 and 512 × 192 resolutions.

Furthermore, the GigaScreen and Hi-Colour techniques may be employed together (again, only theoretically due to the flicker) to produce even richer-coloured images; this format has been named DithVIDE and BZither, both names referring to the dithering methods employed when converting true-colour images to the format. Details:

Pixels: 256 × 192
Attributes: 32 × 24
Colours: ~36
Machine: All (with flickering)
Hardware GigaScreen: Pentagon, eLeMeNt ZX, MB03+ Ultimate (no flickering)

=== KeyLayer ===
The MB03+ Ultimate interface and the eLeMeNt ZX computer provide this graphic mode which allows to display image data from the second video RAM at the place of one selected colour in the video RAM no.1. This adds a third colour to an attribute.

Details:

Pixels: 256 × 192, 512 × 192
Attributes: 32 × 24, 64 × 48, 3 colours per cell
Colours: 15
Machine: eLeMeNt ZX
Interface: MB03+ Ultimate

=== 3colour / Multichrome / RGB-3 / Interchrome ===
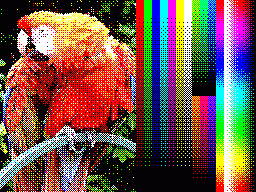
3colour ZX Spectrum screen

Three separate images, comprising a red, green and blue layer, are displayed on the screen rapidly, one after the other, relying on persistence of vision effects to merge the three layers into a single coloured image. The result is an 8-colour image where each pixel may be coloured independently.

Details:

Pixels: 256 × 192
Attributes: 256 × 192
Colours: 8
Machine: All

== Compatible machines and interfaces ==
Later ZX Spectrum compatible machines offered extra video modes. These are based on the standard 256 × 192 mode but incompatible with the original Spectrum. Also interfaces, the Spectra interface and the MB03+ Ultimate interface extend the Spectrum's display to support more colours or/and extra video modes.

=== 16c ===
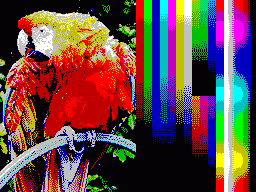
ATM Turbo / Pentagon 16-colour mode

Video mode where each pixel can have one of 16 colours. Details:

Pixels: 256 × 192
Attributes: none, no limitations
Colours: 16
Machine: ATM Turbo, Pentagon

=== 256 × 192 × 16 / Mode 4 ===
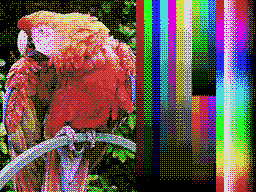
Sam Coupé 256 × 192 × 16 colour mode

A Sam Coupé mode, where each pixel can display one of 16 colours from a 128-colour palette. Details:

Pixels: 256 × 192
Attributes: none, no limitations
Colours: 16 (from 128) per line
Machine: SAM Coupé

=== 384 × 304 × 16 ===
A mode supported by the Pentagon computer. Details:

Pixels: 384 × 304
Attributes: 48 × 38
Colours: 16
Machine: Pentagon

=== HGFX Graphics ===
The eLeMeNt ZX computer and the MB03+ interface provide a planar-based 256 × 192 (LowRes), 512 × 192 (HighRes) and 512 × 384 (SuperHiRes) resolutions. HGFX graphics are handled through planar layers, but can be also accessed as "chunky" RAM pages. The highest, chunky-only, is the "PAL" resolution of 720 × 546 pixels. The HGFX consists of ZX-screen compatible (non-linear or linear) layers-bitplanes to achieve up to 256 colours both in LowRes and HiRes modes, 16 colours in SuperHiRes and 4 colours in the highest resolution. It occupies only part of the memory, similar to the ZX-screen memory, has own internal buffers and can be combined with the original ZX-graphics, in a so-called transparency mode. The HGFX provides a 24-bit true-colour palette (HiRes indeXedColour compatible) with a 256 indexed colours. HGFX screen data can be also displayed in HAM (Amiga-like) and FILL (Apple2GS-like) modes.

The HGFX is based on a more powerful HGFX/Q system, which was originally expandable in a border area to 320 × 240 or 640 × 240.

Details:

Pixels: 256 × 192, 512 × 192, 512 × 384, 720 × 546
Attributes: none, no limitations, plus FILL and HAM modes
Colours: up to 256 (from 16777216), up to 16 (SuperHiRes) and 4 (PAL 720 × 546)
Machine: MB03+ Ultimate, eLeMeNt ZX

=== Layer 2 ===
Details:

Pixels: 256 × 192 (256 colours from 512), 320 × 256 (256 colours from 512) and 640 × 256 (16 colours from 512)
Attributes: none, no limitations
Machine: ZX Spectrum Next

=== Radastan ===
This mode displays 128 96 double-sized pixels. Each pixel holds one of 16 colours, with no attribute limitations. Pixels are stored in linear buffer as 4-bit nibbles (i.e. 2 pixels per byte). The buffer is 6144 bytes long and occupies same memory as 256 × 192 pixel screen.

Details:

Pixels: 128 × 96
Attributes: none, no limitations
Colours: 16 (from 256)
Machine: ZX-Uno, ZX Spectrum Next, MB03+ Ultimate, eLeMeNt ZX

=== LoRES ===
This mode displays 128 × 96 double-sized pixels. Each pixel holds one of 256 colours (from 512), with no attribute limitations. Pixels are stored in linear buffer as 8-bit. The buffer is 12288 bytes long and occupies same memory as 256 × 192 pixel primary (DFILE1) and shadow (DFILE2) screens.

Details:

Pixels: 128 × 96
Attributes: none, no limitations
Colours: 256 (from 512)
Machine: ZX Spectrum Next

=== Spectra (+128) ===
The Spectra has 31 display formats. These allow up to 64 unique colours to be shown simultaneously, and at a variety of colour resolutions, with attribute heights of 1, 2, 4 and 8 pixels, and widths of 2, 4 and 8 pixels.

== High-resolution modes ==
=== 512 × 192 × 2 / Hi-Res ===
This mode was mainly used to display 64 × 24 or 85 × 24 columns text screen, and originally only Timex Sinclair computers (where its named Hi-Res) and some Russian clones can display it. It also takes 12 KB RAM. In the case of the Timex, this mode is activated through the command OUT 255,1. Two graphics editors ("Draw 512" and "Tech-Draw") support this mode, along with BASIC64 and some CP/M implementations.

Details:

Pixels: 512 × 192
Attributes: none, no limitations
Colours: 2 (4 palettes: black & white, blue & yellow, red & cyan, magenta & green) (out of 512 on the ZX Spectrum Next)
Machine: Timex Sinclair, ZX Spectrum Next, ZX-Uno, MB03+ Ultimate, eLeMeNt ZX, Pentagon

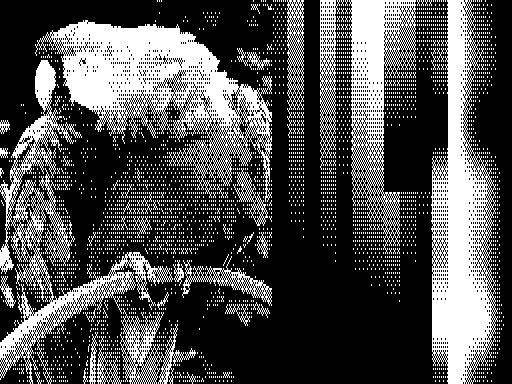
512 × 192 × 2 example image with black & white palette

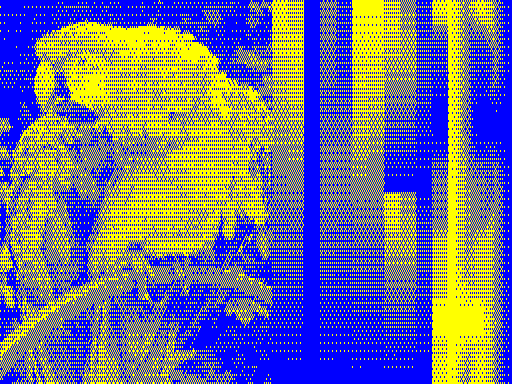
512 × 192 × 2 example image with blue & yellow palette

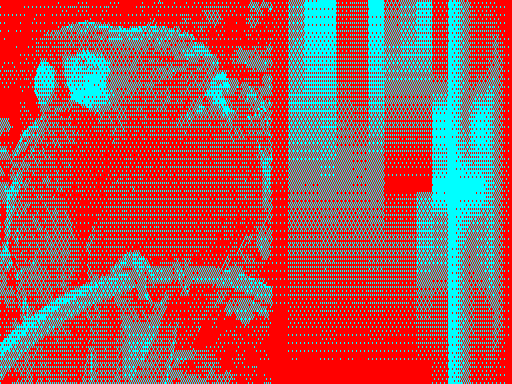
512 × 192 × 2 example image with red & cyan palette

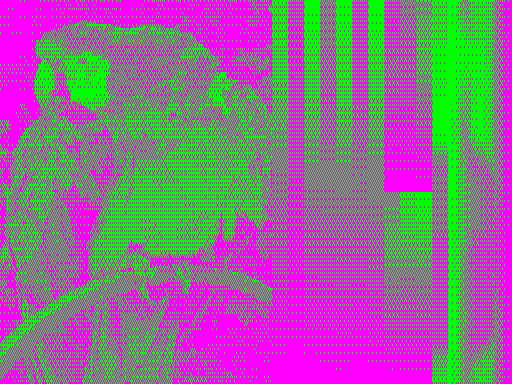
512 × 192 × 2 example image with magenta & green palette

=== 512 × 192 × 4 / Mode 3 ===
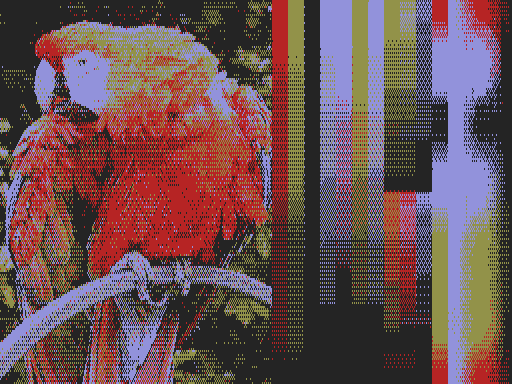
Sam Coupé 512 × 192 × 4 colours example

The Sam Coupé has this mode, where each pixel can use one of 4 colours from palette of 128.

Details:

Pixels: 512 × 192
Attributes: none, no limitations
Colours: 4 (from 128) per line
Machine: SAM Coupé

=== 512 × 384 × 2 ===
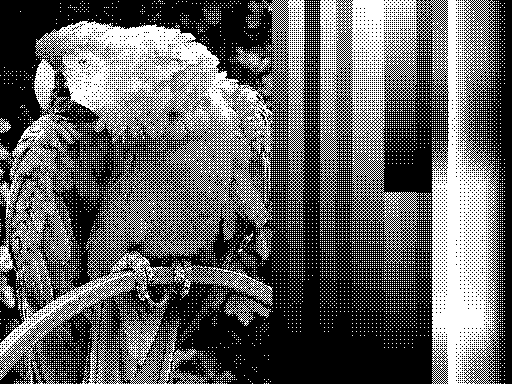
Pentagon 512 × 384 video mode example

A mode supported by the Pentagon computer.

Details:

Pixels: 512 × 384
Colours: monochrome
Machine: Pentagon, Timex Sinclair 2128 (TC 2048-based modification)

=== HiRes Colour ===
Pixels are stored in a linear order. Attributes are doubled in the vertical direction, the composition of the attribute is identical to the original ZX Spectrum mode. HiRes indeXedColour can choose 32 colours from 16,777,216 colours. Two video RAMs can be mixed in both Colour and indeXedColour modes through the Keylayer.

Details:

Pixels: 512 × 192
Attributes: 64 × 48
Colours: 16 (or 32 indexed, from 1677216)
Machine: MB03+ Ultimate, eLeMeNt ZX

== Emulated ==
=== 256 × 192, 256 colours, "256 colour mode", no attributes ===
The SPEC256, EmuZWin and Es.pectrum emulators have a screen mode 256x192 pixels where each pixel can be in one of 256 colours. This is achieved by extending the word size of the emulated Z80 from 8 bits to 64, making eight bits of data available for each pixel; the screen thus takes 48 KB of memory. This mode only exists on the emulator and software graphics must be modified to use it.

Details:
Pixels: 256 × 192
Attributes: none, no limitations
Colours: 256

== Dithering and blur ==
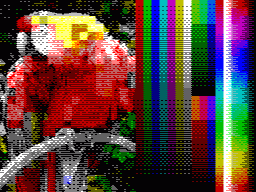
Simulated TV blur on a 256 × 192 ZX Spectrum image with a regular dithering pattern. Patterns intentionally blur generating new colours (ex: orange, grey, etc.). Regular dithering reduces the effective resolution of this image to 128 × 96.

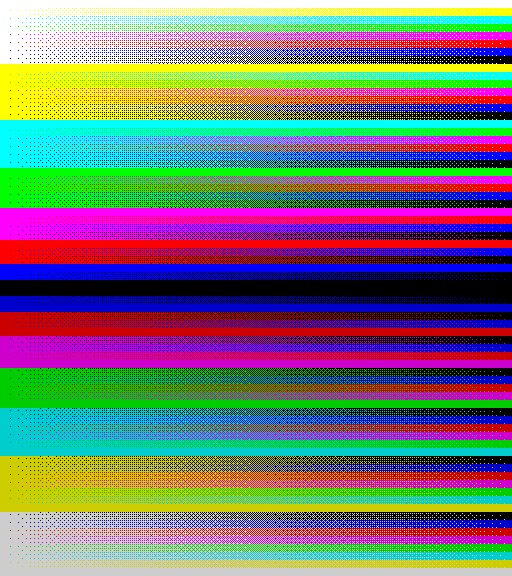
Standard ZX Spectrum palette with dithering, in pixel art

The low per-pixel bit depth of only one bit per pixel has urged the graphic artists (e.g. at ZX-Art) to resort to various dithering techniques. Dithering works very well with CRT TV sets of the era, because analog televisions employ a high amount of blur in both the horizontal and vertical axis. As the focus of the common CRT TV electron beam is intentionally low, the resulting high blur produces colour mixing of neighbouring pixel colours. Blur reduces the unwanted visible noise added by dithering in displayed images.

To faithfully simulate the actual output image of a ZX Spectrum, a modern emulator needs to employ a blur filter of significant strength. Simple bilinear filters introduce too much blur, while the extremely sharp Lanczos filter is inadequate. Therefore, the filter has to be specially constructed to simulate the effect of blur on a common CRT TV set. Most emulators employ filters of very low quality, causing the final image to appear extremely sharp and pixelated. Some emulators, like FUSE, employ available filters in an attempt to reduce the pixelation effect. Those filters produce the final image significantly different than the ZX Spectrum's real video output.

A low mutual contrast of some palette colour combinations allows improvement of the dithering effect by further reducing the amount of noise introduced by dithering. The table below demonstrates this effect – for example, the contrast of a white colour over a yellow background is extremely low, making the white text virtually invisible.

Colour contrast chart
0,00,00	0,00,01	0,00,02	0,00,03	0,00,04	0,00,05	0,00,06	0,00,07
0,01,00	0,01,01	0,01,02	0,01,03	0,01,04	0,01,05	0,01,06	0,01,07
0,02,00	0,02,01	0,02,02	0,02,03	0,02,04	0,02,05	0,02,06	0,02,07
0,03,00	0,03,01	0,03,02	0,03,03	0,03,04	0,03,05	0,03,06	0,03,07
0,04,00	0,04,01	0,04,02	0,04,03	0,04,04	0,04,05	0,04,06	0,04,07
0,05,00	0,05,01	0,05,02	0,05,03	0,05,04	0,05,05	0,05,06	0,05,07
0,06,00	0,06,01	0,06,02	0,06,03	0,06,04	0,06,05	0,06,06	0,06,07
0,07,00	0,07,01	0,07,02	0,07,03	0,07,04	0,07,05	0,07,06	0,07,07
