= Rick Dickinson =

British industrial designer known for his work on computers

- Born: August 11, 1955; United Kingdom
- Died: April 24, 2018 (aged 62)
- Occupation: Industrial designer
- Years active: 1979–2018

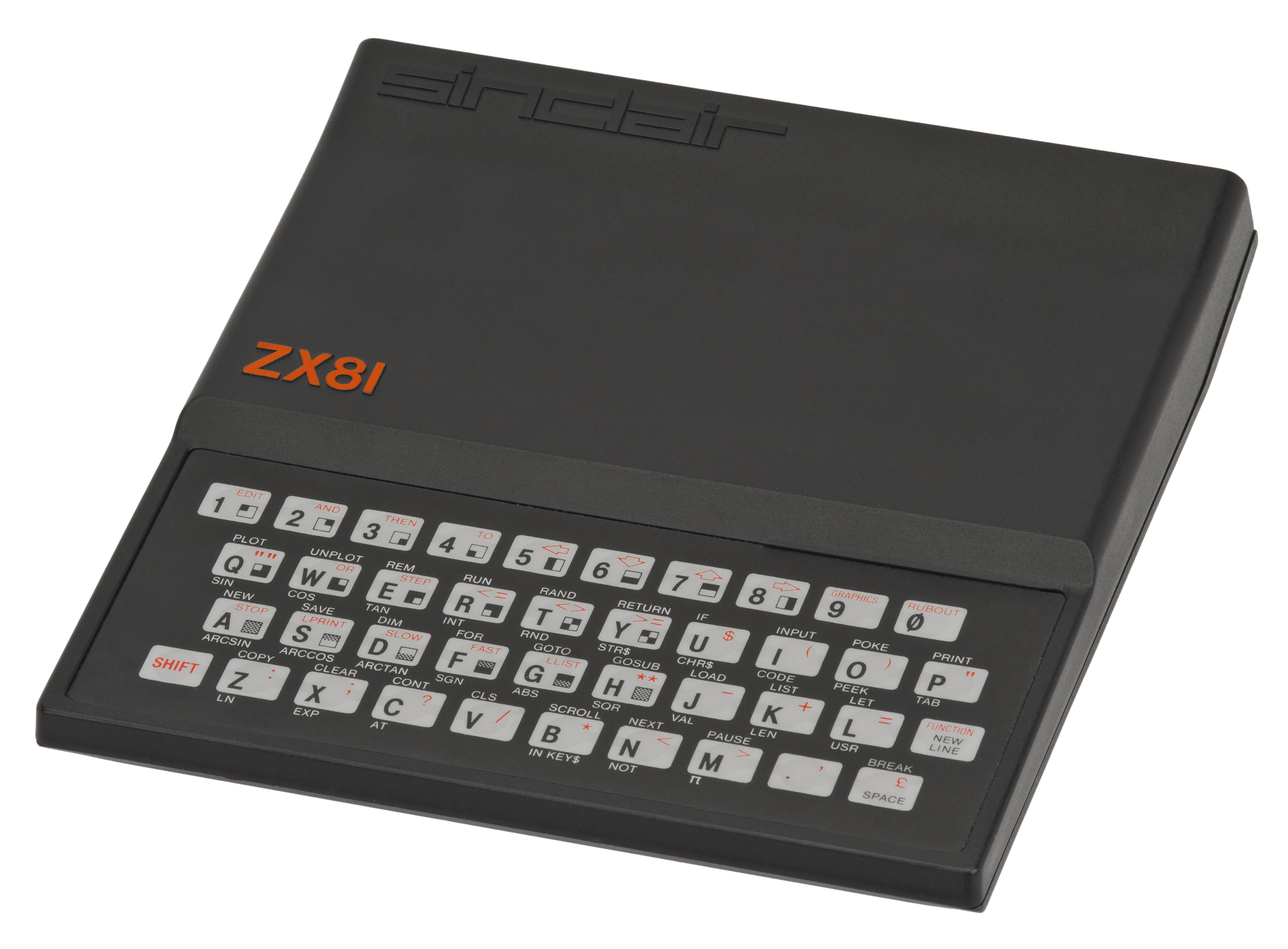
The ZX81 personal computer

Rick Dickinson (11 August 1955 – 24 April 2018) was a British industrial designer best known for developing pioneering computer designs in the 1980s. Notable examples of his design work include the ZX81 case and touch-sensitive keyboard, and the ZX Spectrum's rubber keyboard.

== Early life ==
Dickinson graduated from Newcastle Polytechnic in 1979 with a First Class Bachelor of Arts honours degree in Design for Industry. This new course, with two additional terms for industrial placements, extended the degree to four years and popularised the term "sandwich course", giving Dickinson valuable commercial experience before graduating.

== Sinclair ==
Dickinson joined Sir Clive Sinclair's Sinclair Research Ltd in December 1979, replacing John Pemberton who was leaving Sinclair to head up a new design centre for ITT in Harlow.

Dickinson was the in-house industrial designer of Sinclair Research Ltd, based in Cambridge, UK. He saw John Pemberton's design for the ZX80 case through to completion and designed a memory expansion. He went on to design the ZX81, including its touch-sensitive keyboard, a "clear step forward" in home computer design. In the rubber keyboard for the ZX Spectrum, he replaced the hundreds of components of a conventional keyboard with a design using "maybe four or five moving parts". Along with its colour display, engineered by Richard Altwasser, and commercialised by Sir Clive Sinclair, the Spectrum popularised home computing, coding and gaming. Dickinson also designed the TV80 casing and Sinclair QL.

The ZX81 won a British Design Council award in 1981. It won a Haus Industrieform award and is in a permanent collection in Essen. The Sinclair QL won an Italian design award at the Smau Industrial Design Award.

== Post-Sinclair ==
In 1986, he founded Dickinson Associates, an industrial design consultancy based in Cambridge. That year he produced the industrial design for an early laptop computer, the Cambridge Z88. In 1987 he was commissioned by Alan Sugar to create the industrial design concept for Amstrad's first portable computer.

In 1989, Dickinson, Christopher Curry (Acorn Computers), and Keith Dunning re-thought the MacArthur field microscope and Dickinson designed the Lensman microscope, a portable field microscope. In 1990–91 the Lensman microscope won the BBC design awards, The Prince Of Wales Award For Industrial Innovation And Production, and the Archimedes award for Engineering Excellence.

He produced the industrial design concepts and models of the first "Broad Band phone" for AT&T. Dickinson Associates created the industrial design, mechanical design, and production engineering design for the first GSM mobile phone for Rockwell. Dickinson Associates were also the designers of the Gizmondo handheld console (originally the Gametrac).

In 2014, he published concept designs for modern Sinclair microcomputers. The following year, Dickinson published a series of images of the ZX Spectrum Next re-imagining the original Spectrum design. In 2016, he designed a wireless patch for a medical system to allow expectant mothers to monitor fetal heart rates. He also worked on the design of the ZX Spectrum Vega+ handheld games console. The first ZX Spectrum Next was delivered in February 2020.

== Personal life and death ==
Dickinson had two daughters, Grace and Daisy, with his first wife Kim. He is survived by them and by his second wife Elizabeth ("Lizzy").

Dickinson died on 24 April 2018 while in Texas receiving treatment for cancer first diagnosed in 2015.

== See also ==
- List of English inventors and designers
