= ZX Spectrum Vega+ =

Handheld video game console based on the ZX Spectrum home computer

Sinclair ZX Spectrum Vega+
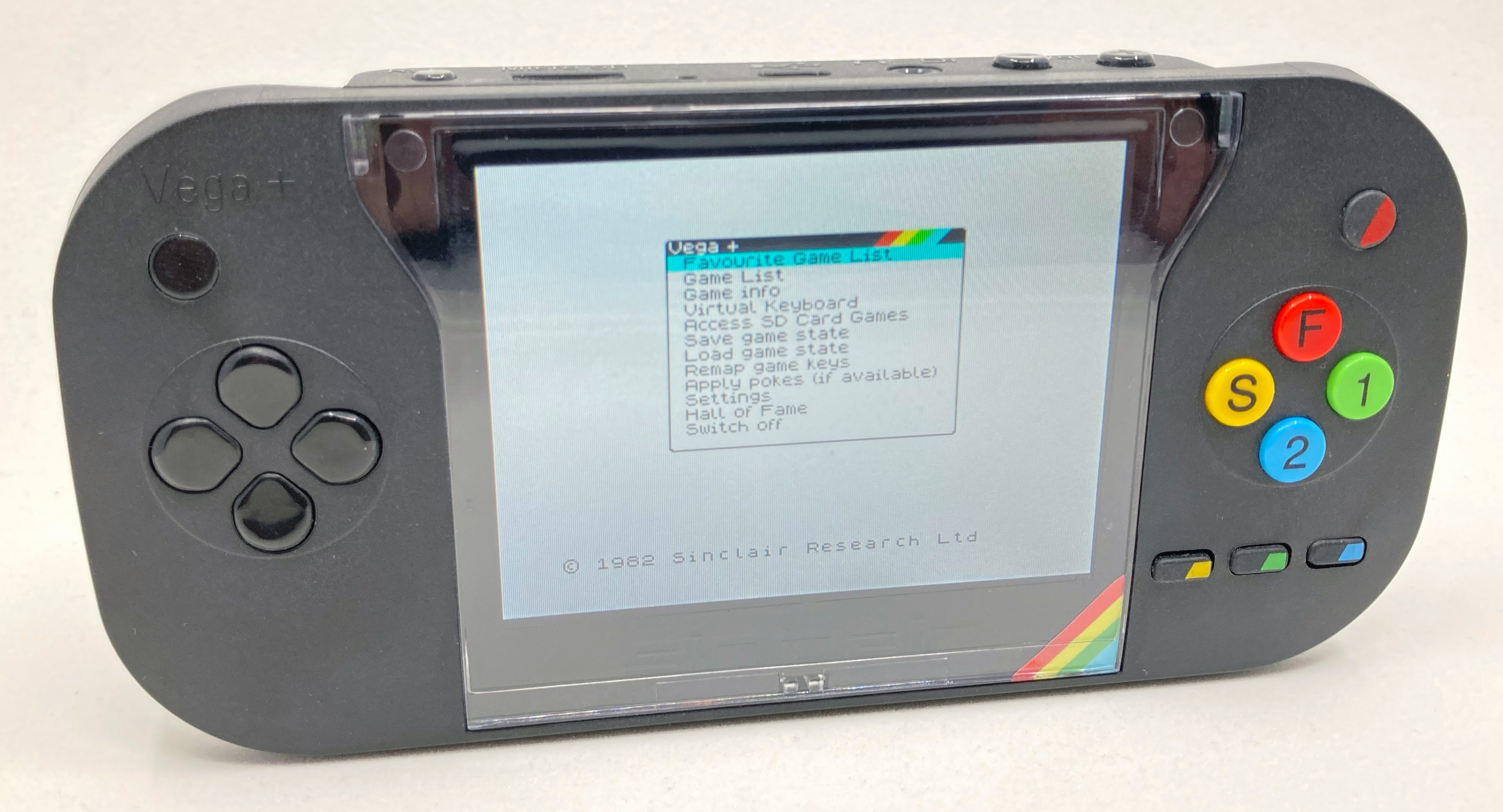
- Delivered design
- Manufacturer: Retro Computers Ltd
- Released: July 2018
- Lifespan: July 2018-February 1, 2019
- Units shipped: At least 400
- System on a chip: Freescale MCIMX233DJM4C
- CPU: ARM9
- Memory: 16MB (DDR SDRAM)
- Storage: 64MB SPI Flash
- Removable storage: microSD card
- Website: indiegogo page

The ZX Spectrum Vega+ is a handheld game console based on the ZX Spectrum and designed by Rick Dickinson as a follow-up to the ZX Spectrum Vega handheld TV game which was released in 2015. Only a small number of Vega+ machines were released, before Retro Computers (who manufactured the devices) was wound up.

== Design and specification ==
The industrial design was produced by Rick Dickinson, the designer of the original ZX Spectrum.

The Vega+ uses Fuse to emulate the ZX Spectrum hardware. It is supplied with 18 pre-loaded games. Games are stored on a removable microSD card.

== History ==
=== Announcement and funding ===
As with the original Vega, the development was funded through the crowdfunding website, Indiegogo.com and surpassed its target of £100,000 in the first two days of campaigning in March 2016. The original intention was to supply the Vega+ with 1,000 games pre-loaded, as the Vega had been.

=== Team split ===
The original Vega was produced by Retro Computers, which consisted of managing director Paul Andrews, Chris Smith (author of "The ZX Spectrum ULA: How to design a microcomputer"), David Levy and Sinclair Research. However, before backer funding was handed over to the company for use, both Andrews and Smith resigned from the company due to "irreconcilable differences" and since then the project has been mired in controversy.

=== Delays ===
Despite claims from Retro Computers Ltd that product development was complete with a prototype ready for production in February 2016 and a statement from SMS Electronics Ltd, the UK based manufacturers, that production had started in April of that year, no consoles had been released and the future of the project was uncertain.

In order to counter the growing concerns, Retro Computers released photos of a "life-size model" of the Vega+ on 25 August 2016 and confirmed that the console was still on target for release in September 2016. On 26 September, they announced that the product would be launched on 20 October 2016 and, according to campaign updates for backers on Indiegogo, production of the ZX Spectrum Vega+ had commenced although no shipment date was given.

In a review of a "production model" published by The Inquirer on 4 November 2016, Retro Computers assured backers that they would receive their units in time for Christmas. but three weeks later on 25 November, they announced that they had identified a problem with one of the buttons on their units during testing and that delivery to backers would be delayed. In a follow-up article from The Inquirer, it was revealed that the "production model" previously reviewed was in fact from a limited run produced for testing purposes and that Retro Computers could no longer guarantee Christmas delivery.

On 23 December 2016 Retro Computers Ltd announced that the problem button had been redesigned and that they would "ship the first units in February 2017". However, on 25 February The Daily Telegraph reported that Indiegogo had closed the crowdfunding campaign due to the continued failure to deliver and quoted Suzanne Martin as claiming the delays were now due to unnamed "game developers pulling their support" and that they had "every intention of delivering".

=== Suspension by Indiegogo ===
In March 2017 Indiegogo halted the funding campaign amid concerns about the ongoing lack of a firm release date and failure to communicate with backers or the media. The BBC revealed that in December 2016, it had been threatened with legal action if it reported on the delays, with Retro Computers' lawyers demanding editorial control over any reports before publication.

On 9 August 2017 Retro Computers announced shipment of Vega+ units to backers within the following 8 weeks. On 8 November, the company once again blamed problems with buttons for delays, telling backers that it was this issue that had caused "so much trouble". As of 9 November 2017, Retro Computers' website was offline, displaying a holding page.

On 5 February 2018, in a series of updates on their Indiegogo campaign page Retro Computers indicated they were "now looking at an estimated delivery date (for the start of shipping units to backers) of April 2018, hopefully sooner". On the same day, BBC News reported that Indiegogo had told them that they would be appointing a collections agency to recoup the money paid to Retro Computers if the console was not released by the end of May. Retro Computers denied that it had been issued an ultimatum by Indiegogo and claimed the BBC report was "completely misleading".

On 6 June 2018, Indiegogo themselves posted an update to the ZX Vega+ campaign page stating that Retro Computers had failed to fulfill the three requirements that they had given the company, including providing them with a finished console, and they would be appointing a collections agency in an attempt to recoup funds for backers. Retro Computers' response, as reported by BBC News, was "We responded yesterday saying that we would sooner give a demonstration of a unit to their UK representative, and asking Indiegogo to request that he contact us to fix an appointment. Their reaction was this latest statement".

=== Refund case ===
In January 2018, a backer won a small claims court action against the company with the judge ruling that there was "an implied contract of sale" between the backer and the company.

=== Dispute with shareholders ===
On 27 April 2018, a statement was released by 75% of the shareholders of Retro Computers (Paul Andrews, Chris Smith and corporate director Sinclair Research Limited) which demanded a shareholders meeting with the aim of replacing the current directors of the company. This was immediately followed by an update by the company on their Indiegogo page claiming that "initial shipments" of the "first batch of ZX Vega+s" would be made "between the 8th and 12th May 2018". On 17 May 2018, the company claimed on their Facebook page that they had been unable to ship the consoles because one of their partners had requested confirmation that they held the rights for the 1000 games due to be included on the Vega+ console.

=== Licensing issues ===
On 1 August 2018, BBC reported that Sky, who holds the rights to the Sinclair and ZX Spectrum brands, informed Retro Computers that the licence to use these brand names would be revoked on 7 August.

=== First units delivered ===
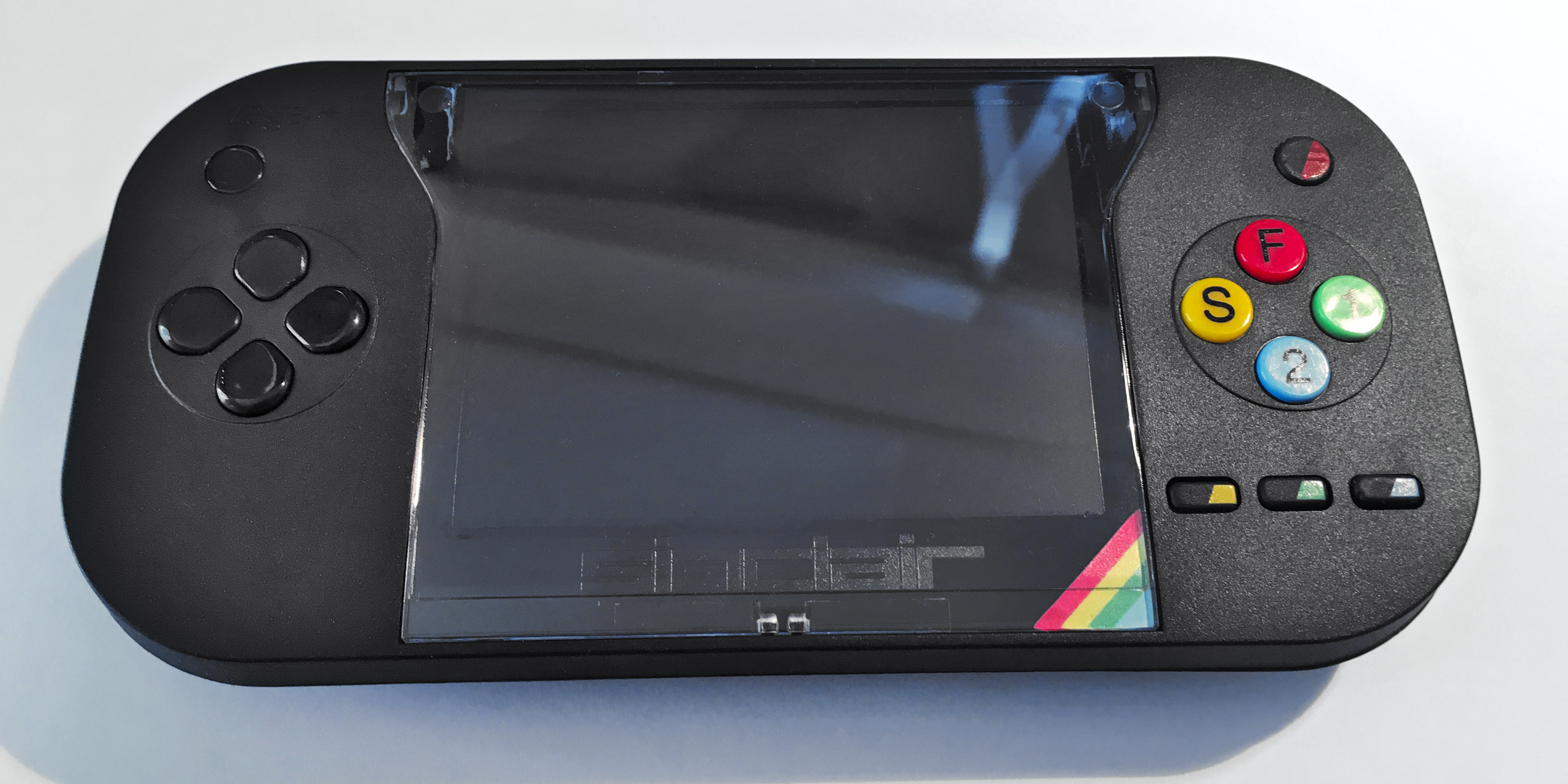
One of the delivered units

On 30 July 2018, Eurogamer reported that one backer had received a ZX Vega+ console, quoting them as being "quite disappointed" that "the few supplied sample games don't work" and that the "build quality's not the greatest". This followed Retro Computers' announcement that they would ship 400 "Blankety Blank" consoles, a version of the unit with no built-in games, made available after the company admitted it no longer had licensing agreements for most of the 1,000 games promised for the unit.

Reviewing the Vega+, The Register criticised numerous aspects and features of the machine, including its design and build quality and summed up by saying that the "entire feel is plasticky and inconsequential".

=== Winding up ===
On 5 February 2019, The Register reported that Retro Computers had been wound up on 1 February 2019 following a petition presented by Private Planet Ltd. The sole director of Private Planet, Janko Mrsic-Flogel, was a director of Retro Computers from April 2016 to August 2018 and also used the Indiegogo crowdfunding platform to raise over US$2.5 million to produce the Gemini PDA for Planet Computers Ltd.
