= IS-DOS =

Disk operating system for Soviet/Russian ZX Spectrum clones

iS-DOS
- Developer: Iskra Soft
- Working state: current
- Source model: Closed
- Initial release: 1990; 36 years ago
- Package manager: None
- Supported platforms: Russian ZX Spectrum clones
- Kernel type: Monolithic
- Influenced by: TR-DOS
- Official website: trd.speccy.cz

iS-DOS is a disk operating system for Soviet/Russian ZX Spectrum clones. iS-DOS was developed in 1990 or 1991, by Iskra Soft, in Leningrad, Soviet Union, now Saint Petersburg, Russia.

It handles floppy disks (double sided, double density), hard disk drives, and CD-ROMs. Maximum iS-DOS disk partitioning size on a hard disk is 16 MiB.

Unlike TR-DOS, iS-DOS is resident in random-access memory (RAM), and thus reduces the amount of memory available for user programs.

== Versions ==
iS-DOS Chic is a version developed for the Nemo KAY. It provides more memory for user programs.

TASiS, based on iS-DOS Chic, is a modern version developed by NedoPC for the ATM Turbo 2+ in 2006, supports the enhanced text mode and larger memory of that model.

== Distributors ==
- Slot Ltd. (Moscow) distributed iS-DOS in Moscow and regions in 1990s, and issued paper books.
- Nemo (Saint Petersburg) distributed iS-DOS in ex-USSR until 2004, and issued Open Letters electronic press.
- iS-DOS Support Team (Saratov Oblast) distributes iS-DOS in ex-USSR and issues iS-Files electronic press.
- NedoPC distributes TASiS as freeware.

== Books ==
- Картавцев И.Ю, Самыловский С.В., Криштопа С.В. "iS-DOS. Руководство пользователя". IskraSoft, Slot, С-Пб, Москва, 1993, 128 стр.
- Криштопа С.В. "Операционная система IS-DOS для ZX-SPECTRUM. Руководство программиста". "IskraSoft" С-Пб, "Slot" Москва, 1994, 84 стр.

== See also ==
- DISCiPLE
- Kay 1024
- ATM Turbo 2+
- Scorpion ZS-256
