= Pentagon (computer) =

Soviet home computer

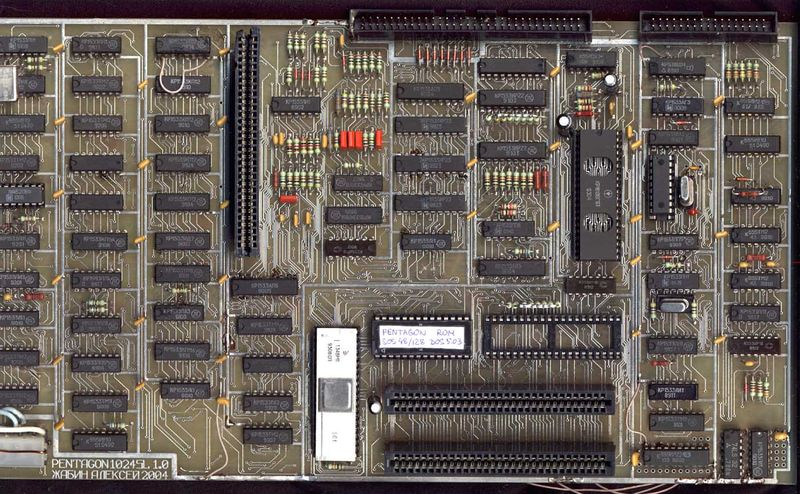
- Pentagon-1024SL v1.x
- Also known as: Пентагон
- Type: Home computer
- Released: 1989; 37 years ago
- Media: tape, floppy disks, hard drives (depending on models)
- Operating system: Sinclair BASIC, TR-DOS
- CPU: КР1858ВМ1/3, Т34ВМ1, Z80A, B, H @ 3.5 MHz (7 MHz turbo mode)
- Memory: 48 to 4096KB (depending on model)
- Storage: tape, Beta 128 Disk Interface, hard drives (depending on models)
- Graphics: 256x192, 384x304, 512x192 monochrome
- Sound: Beeper, Covox, UltraSound (depending on model)
- Backward compatibility: ZX Spectrum 128
- Related: ATM (computer)
- Website: pentagon.nedopc.com

The Pentagon (Russian: Пентагон) home computer is an enhanced clone of the British-made Sinclair ZX Spectrum 128. It was manufactured by amateurs in the former Soviet Union, following freely distributable documentation. Its PCB was copied all over the ex-USSR between 1991-1996, making it a widespread ZX Spectrum clone. The name "Pentagon" derives from the shape of the original Pentagon 48 PCB which has a diagonal cut in one of the corners, giving it five sides.

== Versions ==
- Pentagon 48K (1989 by Vladimir Drozdov)
- Pentagon 128K (1991)
- Pentagon 128K 2+ (1991 by ATM)
- Pentagon 128K 3+ (1993 by Solon)
- Pentagon 1024SL v1.x (2005 by Alex Zhabin)
- Pentagon-1024SL v2.x (2006 by Alex Zhabin)
- Pentagon ver.2.666 (2009 by Alex Zhabin)

The Pentagon 1024SL v2.3 included most of the upgrades of the standard Spectrum architecture, including 1024 KB RAM, Beta 128 Disk Interface and ZX-BUS slots (especially for IDE and General Sound cards). This model also featured a "turbo" mode (7 MHz instead of the original's 3.50 MHz).

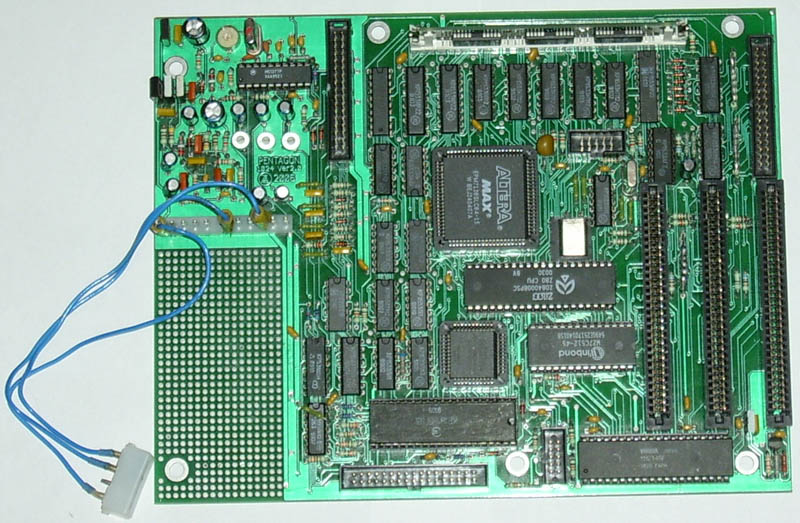
Pentagon-1024SL v2.x

=== Upgrades from the original ZX Spectrum ===
- Extra RAM ranging from 256 KB to 4 MB
- Several sound card possibilities such as Covox (usually named as SounDrive) or DMA UltraSound
- Additional video modes: 512x192 monochrome, 384x304, 256x192x15 (with no Attribute clash)
- CMOS with persistent real-time clock
- IDE Controller for hard drives
- "Turbo Mode" that clocks the CPU up to 7 MHz
