= ZX Spectrum Next =

Remake of a popular microcomputer

- Developer: SpecNext
- Manufacturer: SMS Electronics
- Type: Home computer
- Released: 1st Kickstarter: December 2017 (development board), February 2020 (cased); 2nd Kickstarter: December 2023; 3rd Kickstarter: July 2025
- Units sold: 1st Kickstarter: 3010+ (3010 cased); 2nd Kickstarter: 5100+; 3rd Kickstarter: 7000+
- Operating system: NextZXOS + NextBASIC, Sinclair BASIC, CP/M
- CPU: Zilog Z80 implemented in FPGA @ 3.5, 7, 14 or 28 MHz
- Memory: 1st Kickstarter: 1024 KB (upgradeable to 2048 KB); 2nd Kickstarter: 2048 KB; 3rd Kickstarter: 4096 KB
- Display: 128 × 96 to 640 × 256 pixels; 16 or 256 colours from a palette of 512 colours; VGA, RGB, HDMI
- Sound: Beeper, 3× AY-3-8910, 4× 8-bit DAC

The ZX Spectrum Next is an 8-bit home computer, initially released in 2017, which is compatible with software and hardware for the 1982 ZX Spectrum. It also has enhanced capabilities. It is intended to appeal to retrocomputing enthusiasts and to "encourage a new generation of bedroom coders", according to project member Jim Bagley.

Despite the name, the machine is not directly affiliated with Sinclair Research Ltd., Sir Clive Sinclair or the current owner of the trademarks, Sky Group.

== History ==
The Next started life in 2010 in Brazil, as a variant of the TK95 Spectrum clone. In 2016, Victor Trucco and Fabio Belavenuto announced the "TBBlue" firmware, named after the two creators and the colour of the solder mask of the motherboard, a bare circuit board implementation of the product for advanced hobbyists.

With the help of Henrique Olifiers the duo wanted to export the TBBlue to the UK, the ZX Spectrum's original home, having received moderate success with the board in Brazil.

The Next was first announced as a distinct product in 2016 after the participation of original Spectrum industrial designer Rick Dickinson was secured. A crowdfunding campaign was launched on the Kickstarter platform in January 2017 with an initial funding goal of £250,000. At the end of the campaign 3,113 backers pledged £723,390. While the campaign was successful in creating a userbase for the new platform, it was not a commercial success. Due to what campaign creators call "bad tax advice" the production of the machines ended up causing costs instead of revenue to the creators.

Although initially intended to use the original ZX Spectrum's Z80 chip, the design was altered to use the Xilinx Spartan-6 FPGA, to allow "hardware sprites, scrolling, and other advanced features to be incorporated within the machine itself".

The board-only computer was delivered to backers in December 2017. After some design and production delays, the first batch of finished units were delivered to backers in March 2020.

A second Kickstarter launched on 11 August 2020 at 21:00 BST and reached 100% funding (£250,000) within minutes. The campaign closed on 10 September 2020 with £1,847,106 (738% funding)

A third Kickstarter, featuring a translucent magenta option, launched on 19 July 2025 at 08:00 and reached 100% funding within 7 minutes and 200% within 42 minutes (First hour of pledging on YouTube). Surpassing the total funding of the first Kickstarter took slightly less than 3 hours; surpassing the second Kickstarter took 20 days. With 1 hour to spare, it surpassed the total funding of both previous Kickstarters combined to ultimately close with £2,612,335 (1044% funding).

=== Industrial design ===
The Next's case design is by Rick Dickinson who designed the original 48K Spectrum and Spectrum+, but died during the development of the keyboard of the computer. It takes design cues from the original Spectrum, Spectrum+ and Spectrum 128, not the later Spectrum +2 or +3 manufactured by Amstrad. In addition to Rick Dickinson's work, his industrial design partner, Phil Candy, also collaborated on the design and took over after Dickinson's passing.

== Reception ==
The Next has received generally favorable reviews in the specialist press. In the official Raspberry Pi magazine "MagPi", Lucy Hattersley called it "a lovely piece of kit", noting that it is "well-designed and well-built: authentic to the original, and with technology that nods to the past while remaining functional and relevant in the modern age".

In PC Pro magazine, columnist Gareth Halfacree called the Next "undeniably impressive" while noting that the printed manual lacks an index, and that some features are "not quite ready".

Retro Gamer featured an 8-page interview with the creators of the machine about the highs and lows of creating a "true successor to the much-loved Sinclair micro".

== Models ==
Revisions of the Next's motherboard's design are referred to as "Issues", in keeping with the original ZX Spectrum, and have been made to either improve quality or in response to problems with the supply of components. Care has been taken to not change the core capabilities, compatibility, and specifications of all models of the Next between Issues.

Overview of the Next hardware specifications
Aspect	Details
CPU	Z80N (Zilog Z80 compatible with additional instructions) implemented in FPGA
Speed	3.5, 7, 14 or 28 MHz
RAM	1024 KB base (768 KB free), 2048 KB maximum (1792 KB free), in 8 KB banks paged in and out of Z80's 64 KB address space; 256 KB is reserved for ROMs
Graphics	From 128 × 96 to 640 × 256 pixels.
Colour	Depending on mode and layer, 16 or 256 colours on-screen with no colour clash in certain modes, from a palette of 512 colours.
Sprites	Up to 128 hardware sprites of 16 × 16 pixels
Sound	Traditional "Beeper", 3× General Instrument AY-3-8910 programmable sound generators (each with 3 channels for a total of 9 channels), and 4× 8-bit DACs implemented in FPGA
Software	NextZXOS Operating System + NextBASIC; prior versions of Sinclair BASIC and optionally CP/M
Connectivity	Tape in/out, Audio out, HDMI,VGA/RGB, 2× Cursor/Kempston/Sinclair joystick connectors, PS/2 mouse port (Kempston mouse emulation), ZX Spectrum compatible expansion bus, WiFi on selected models
Storage	Built-in DV-MMC-compatible SD-card slot; optionally cassette tape, Sinclair ZX Microdrive (with Sinclair ZX Interface 1) or any other storage system compatible with original ZX Spectrum series

=== First Kickstarter ===
Four models of the Next were produced in the first Kickstarter using the Xilinx Spartan-6 FPGA.

Overview of the first Kickstarter's Next models
Model name	Cased	real-time clock installed	Wi-Fi installed	Raspberry Pi Zero "Accelerator" installed	Board Issue	Notes
ZX Spectrum Next developer board	No	No	No	No	2A	Only board Issue which can fit in an original, modified, ZX Spectrum case
ZX Spectrum Next	Yes	No	No	No	2B	Does not require modification, with a capacitor, to eliminate electronic "noise"
ZX Spectrum Next Plus	Yes	Yes	Yes	No	2B	
ZX Spectrum Next Accelerated	Yes	Yes	Yes	Yes	2B	Accelerator enables loading compressed tzx tape images from SD-card and provides emulation of the MOS Technology 6581 SID soundchip.

All models include 1024 KB RAM (768 KB free) and can be upgraded by the owner;

- Adding two 512 KB chips brings the RAM to 2048 KB (1792 KB free).
- An internal "beeper" speaker can be installed.
- Any of the higher models' optional extras can be installed.

The box colour is blue, similar to the text on the 1 on a ZX Spectrum.

=== Second Kickstarter ===
Two models of the Next were offered in the second Kickstarter using the Xilinx Artix-7 XC7A15T FPGA.

Overview of the second Kickstarter's Next models
Model name	Raspberry Pi Zero "Accelerator" installed	Notes
ZX Spectrum Next Plus	No	Wi-Fi module relocated to avoid audio interference
ZX Spectrum Next Accelerated	Yes	

Both models are cased, include a real-time clock, Wi-Fi, and 2048 KB RAM (1792 KB free), use board Issue 4, and can be upgraded by the owner;

- An internal "beeper" speaker can be installed.
- A Raspberry Pi Zero unit can be installed as an "Accelerator" into the Next Plus.

The box colour is red, similar to the text on the 2 on a ZX Spectrum.

=== Third Kickstarter ===
Two board models and three cased models of the Next were offered in the third Kickstarter.

Overview of the third Kickstarter's Next models
Model name	Cased	Raspberry Pi Zero "Accelerator" installed	PCB colour	Notes
ZX Spectrum Next developer board	No	No	Black	Will only fit in an original, modified, case
ZX Spectrum Next upgrade board	No	No	Black	Will only fit in an ZX Spectrum Next case
ZX Spectrum Next	Yes	No	Blue	
ZX Spectrum Next + Accelerator	Yes	Yes	Blue	
ZX Spectrum Next Magenta Accelerated	Yes	Yes	White	Comes in a translucent magenta case

The third Kickstarter machine introduced a larger FPGA (Artix A7 XC7A35T-2CSG324C) with twice as many Look-Up Tables (LUTs), flip-flops and RAM as the second machine's A7 XC7A15T. It also has out of the box support for the Sinclair QL and Commodore 64 with stretch goals met for support for the SAM Coupé, ZX81 and Amstrad CPC 6128. All models include a real-time clock, Wi-Fi and 4096 KB RAM.

The translucent case colour is magenta, similar to the text on the 3 on a ZX Spectrum.

== Operating system and software ==
The default operating system of the Next is NextZXOS. The operating system provides a graphical file browser and menu based access to Next's features. In addition the machine has an extended BASIC interpreter NextBASIC, with commands and features added to support the new capabilities, such as support for 9-channel AY-sound and built-in sprite graphics editor.

NextZXOS and NextBASIC were written by Garry Lancaster, and the machine is provided with printed manual covering the OS and BASIC in detail. The first edition of the manual can be downloaded from the official website.

In addition to the native OS, the Next is able to run prior versions of Sinclair BASIC, such as 48k BASIC and 128k BASIC. The Next is also able to run CP/M. Although this does potentially open a sizeable software library of CP/M to the Next users, it is worth noting that CP/M cannot take advantage of the machine's advanced capabilities, such as large memory.

Some 3rd party "Next only" software has sprung into existence despite the comparatively short time that the machine has been on the market. These include the likes of NxTel by Robin Verhagen-Guest (a Teletext-style Next specific webservice accessible via Wi-Fi), and NextDAW by Gari Biasillo (a digital audio workstation software capable of utilizing the Next's sound capabilities for creating Chiptunes). NxTel comes bundled with the machine on the accompanying SD-Card.

Some of the original ZX Spectrum games have also been upgraded or are being upgraded to utilize Next's improved graphics and sound. Among the most notable remakes are Atic Atac with improved graphics by Craig Stevenson. The new game version is backed by the current owner of the rights Rare studio and the Next port is written by Kev Brady.

== Licensing ==
The NextZXOS and NextBASIC are both released under Open/Closed-Source hybrid license called "The Next License", with all parts of the OS being closed source by default, unless explicitly placed under open-source MIT License. The Next License prohibits selling the software and charging a duplication fee for it, but cost-free distribution is allowed under the Creative Commons Attribution-ShareAlike license. The OS and BASIC are publicly hosted on GitLab.

Hardware is released under a "mixed source" proprietary license. The VHDL/Verilog for the FPGA digital design is available on GitLab and licensed under GPL3. Everything else is closed including the Schematics, the PCB master files and keyboard/case 3D model.

== Personalities and alternative FPGA cores ==
The Next is able to reproduce the behaviour of any prior Sinclair ZX80, ZX81 or Spectrum machine, as well as some notable ZX Spectrum clones (both official and unlicensed) through a feature called "Personalities". Examples of such clone personalities are Timex Sinclair TC2048 and the Russian Pentagon machines. Personalities can match hardware features, timings, memory, graphics and sound capabilities and OS version with the machines to be reproduced in an effort to provide full compatibility with them. The default personality of the Next is based on Sinclair ZX Spectrum +3e. It is also possible for the user to configure and add new personalities as needed.

The Next can also be used to recreate a number of other, non-Spectrum based computers, such as the Acorn BBC Micro, as long as their hardware will "fit" into the FPGA. These recreations are known as "cores". The machine can also be made to boot directly into an alternative core. While the use of alternate cores is supported, the cores themselves are unofficial third-party projects. A Sinclair QL core is described as "very stable, [ booting ] every time".

== Clones and emulators ==
An N-GO board, a clone of ZX Spectrum Next

The Next team actively encourages the manufacture of clone machines to promote and expand the userbase as much as possible.

Clones of the Next include:

Xilinx FPGA-based clones

- ZXDOS+ (board) / gomaDOS+ (board with case)
- N-GO (board/computer), which can be installed into a modified ZX Spectrum case in the same way as the Next Issue 2A or comes with its own mechanical keyboard+enclosure
- XBerry Pi, a Raspberry Pi sized miniaturized clone

Altera FPGA-based clones

- UnAmiga / UnAmiga Reloaded (board with case)
- Multicore 2 / Multicore 2+ (board with case)
- NeptUNO (board with case)
- MiST (Core with TZX loading and RTC support)
- Sidi (Low-cost MiST derivative)

Intel Cyclone V FPGA-based clones

- MiSTer with dual SDRAM/SRAM memory addon

Emulators in software

- ZEsarUX by Cesar Hernandez
- MAME 0.267 or higher
- #CSpect by Mike Dailly
