= Scan rate =

Scan rate is a term used when discussing raster-scan video, describing the speed at which the image is transmitted or displayed. There are two types:

- Horizontal scan rate, the number of times per second that a single horizontal line of image data is transmitted or displayed
- Vertical scan rate, the number of times per second that an entire screenful of image data is transmitted or displayed, also known as "refresh rate."
