= Beta Disk Interface =

Disk interface for ZX Spectrum computers

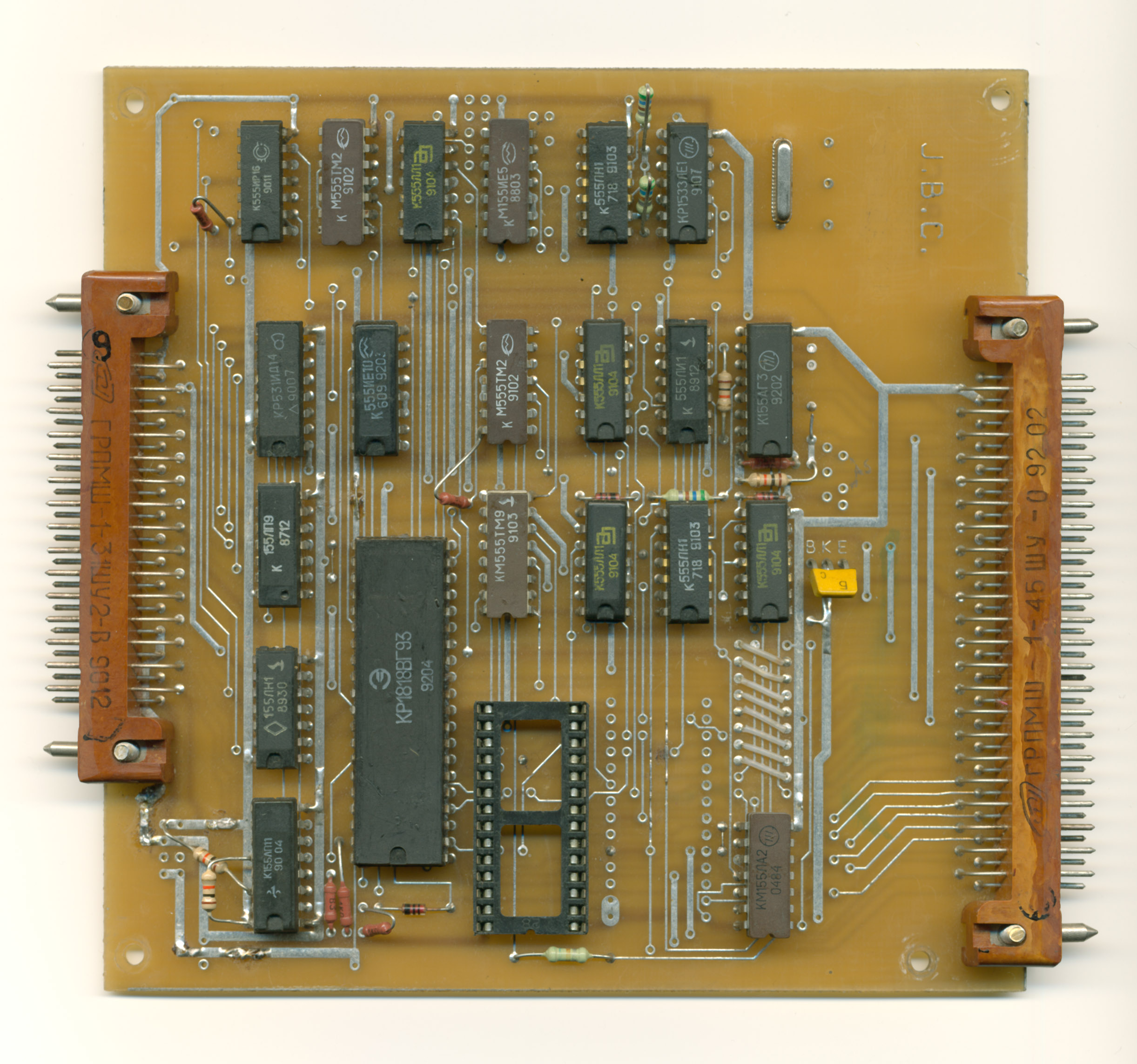
Soviet clone of Beta Disk Interface

Beta Disk Interface is a disk interface for ZX Spectrum computers, developed by Technology Research Ltd in 1984 and released in 1985, with a price of £109.25 (or £249.75 with one disk drive).

Beta 128 Disk Interface is a 1987 version, supporting ZX Spectrum 128 machines (due to different access point addresses).

Beta Disk Interfaces were distributed with the TR-DOS operating system in ROM, also attributed to Technology Research Ltd.. The interface was based on the WD1793 chip. Latest firmware version is 5.03 (1986).

The Beta Disk Interface handles single- and double-sided, 40- or 80-track double-density floppy disks, and up to four drives.

== Clones ==
This interface was popular for its simplicity, and the Beta 128 Disk Interface was cloned all around the USSR. The first known USSR clones were ones produced by НПВО "Вариант" (NPVO "Variant", Leningrad) in 1989.

Beta 128 schematics are included in various Soviet/Russian ZX Spectrum clones, but some variants only support two drives. Phase correction of the drive data signal is also implemented differently.

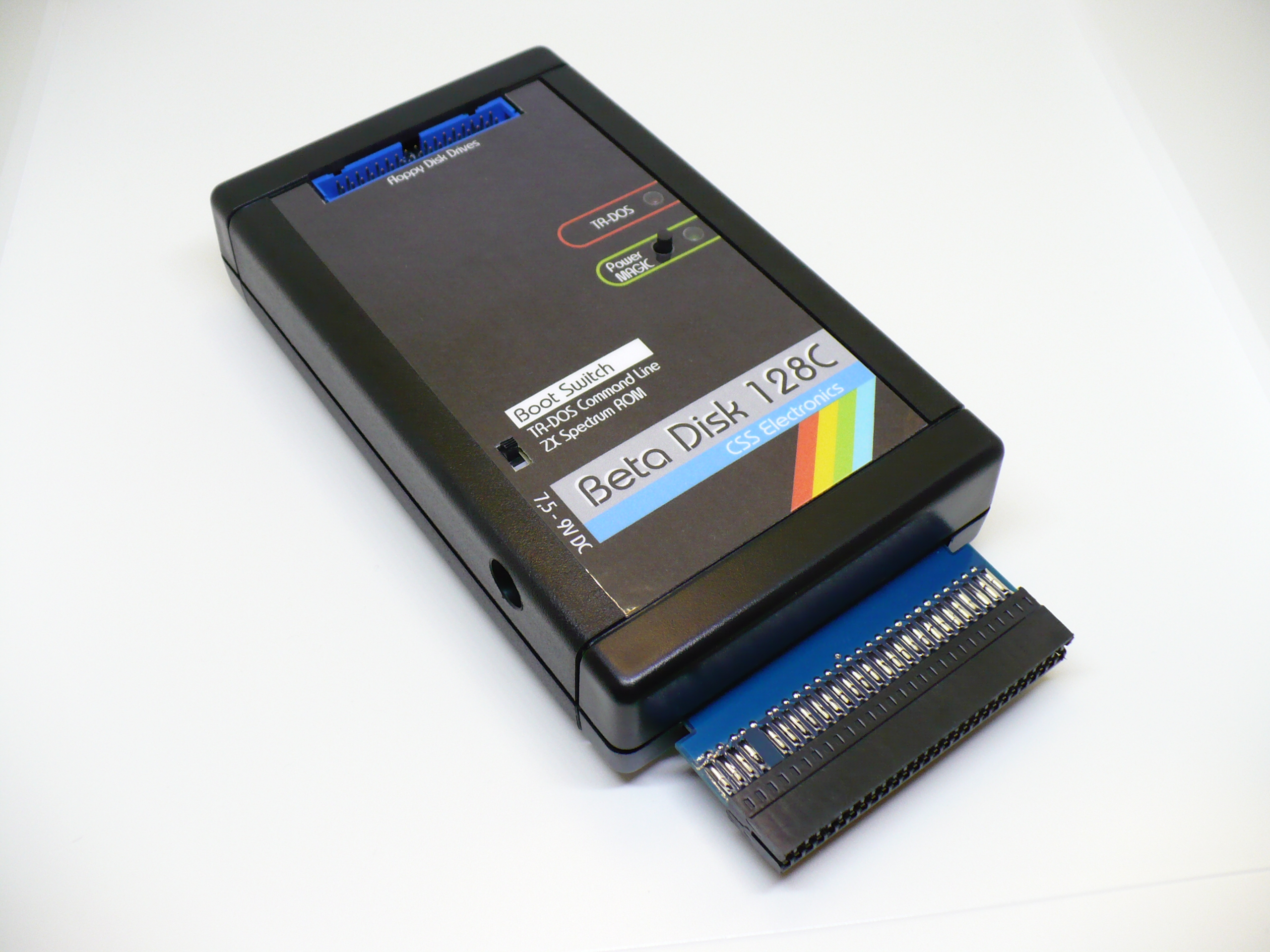
Czech clone Beta Disk 128C

Between 2018 and 2021, Beta Disk clones were produced in the Czech Republic, with the names such as Beta Disk 128C, 128X and 128 mini.

== Operating systems support ==
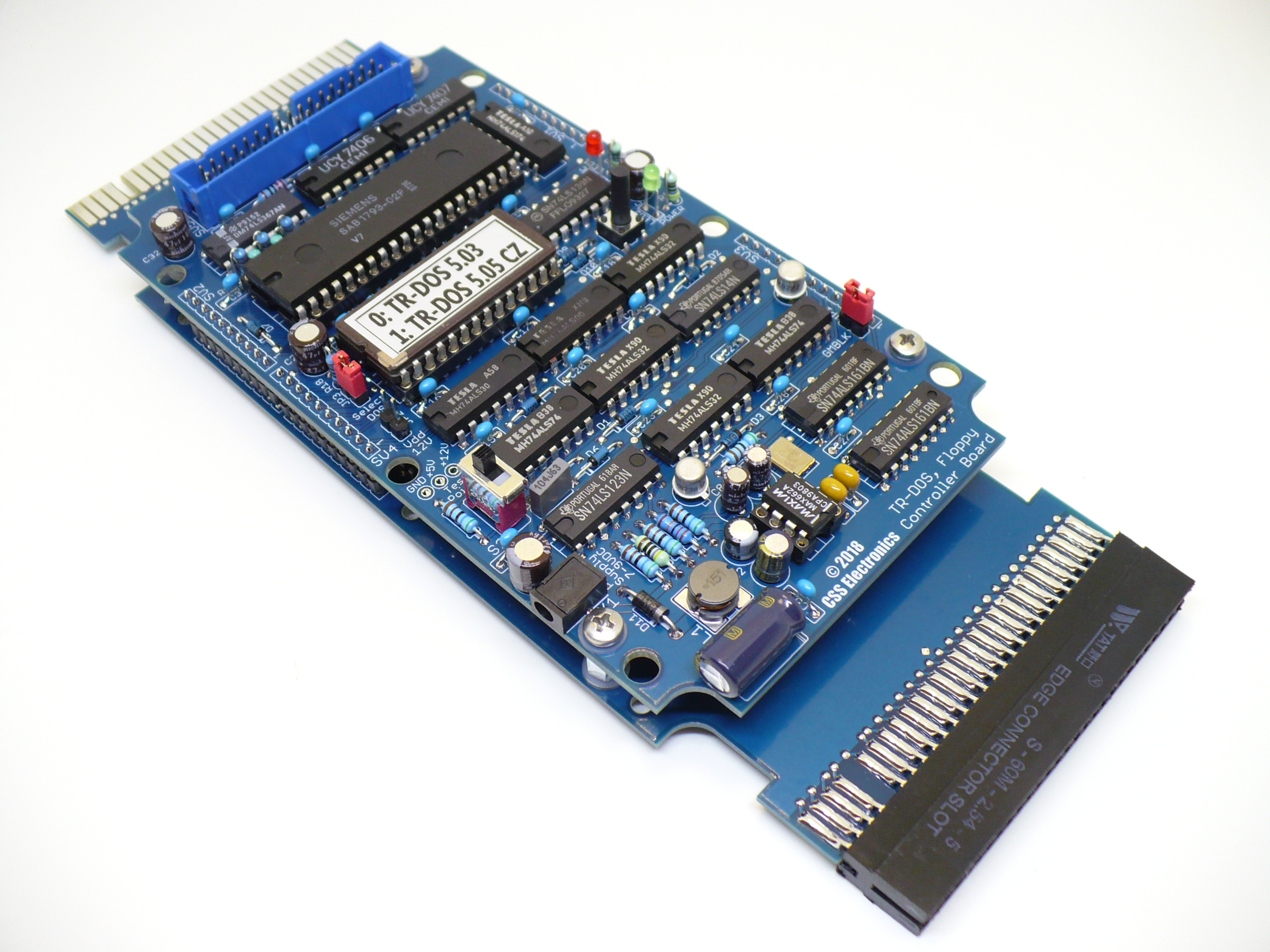
Beta Disk 128C (electronics)

- TR-DOS
- iS-DOS
- CP/M (various hack versions)
- DNA OS

== See also ==
- DISCiPLE

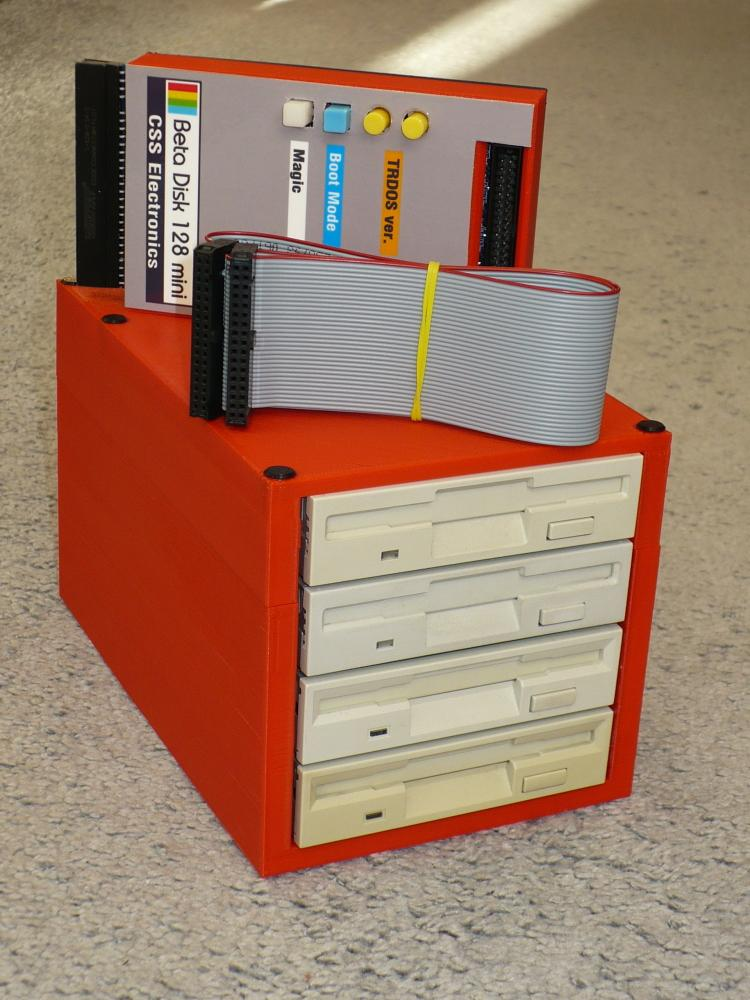
Set of controller and floppy box from 2021

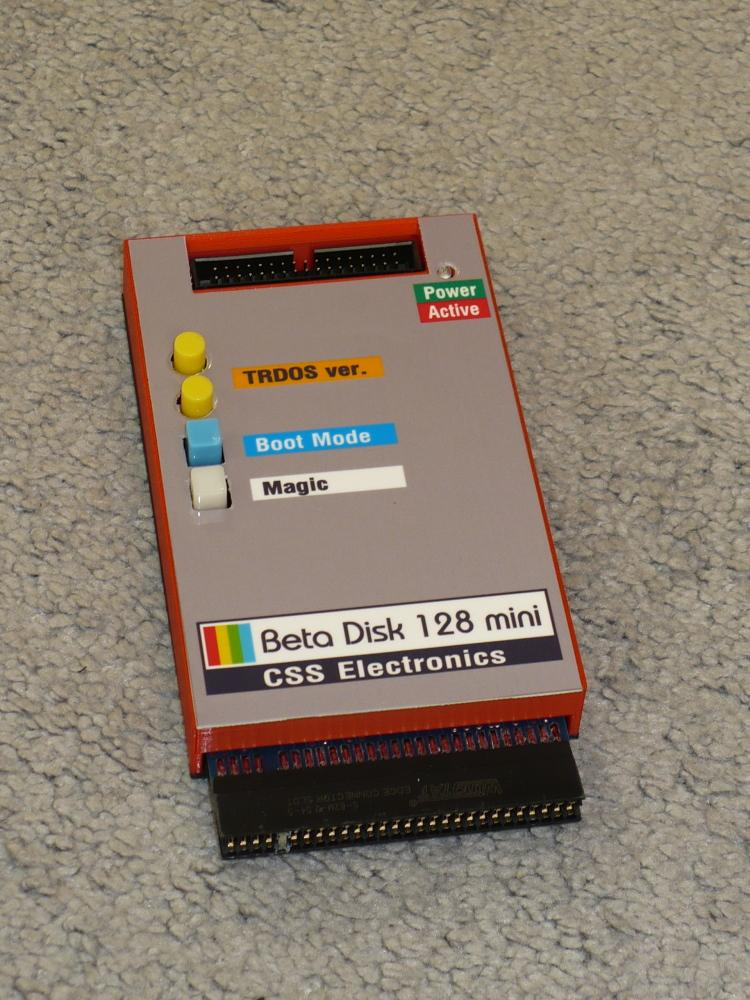
Controller Beta Disk 128 mini from 2021
