= TR-DOS =

Disk operating system for the ZX Spectrum

- Developer: Technology Research Ltd
- Initial release: 1984; 41 years ago
- Latest release: 5.03 / 1986; 39 years ago
- Available in: English
- Platforms: ZX Spectrum
- License: proprietary

TR-DOS is a disk operating system for the ZX Spectrum with Beta Disc and Beta 128 disc interfaces. TR-DOS and Beta disc were developed by Technology Research Ltd (UK), in 1984. A clone of this interface is also used in the Russian Pentagon and Scorpion machines.

It became a standard in Russia and most disk releases for the ZX Spectrum, especially of modern programs, are made for TR-DOS as opposed to other disk systems.

The latest official firmware version is 5.03 (1986). Unofficial versions with various enhancements and bug-fixes have been released since 1990, with the latest being 6.10E (2006).

TR-DOS handles SS/DS, SD/DD floppy disks. All modern versions support RAM Disk and some versions support hard disks.

Current emulators support TR-DOS disk images in the formats .TRD or .SCL.

== Commands ==
The following list of commands is supported by TR-DOS V4.

- 40
- CAT
- CLOSE
- COPY
- ERASE
- FORMAT
- GO TO
- INPUT
- LOAD
- MOVE
- NEW
- OPEN
- PRINT
- RETURN
- RUN
- SAVE

Utility programs include:

- FILER
- TAPECOPY (replaces BACKUP, COPY and SCOPY utility programs in TR-DOS V3)

== See also ==
- iS-DOS
- CP/M
- DISCiPLE
