= Turbo button =

Computer button

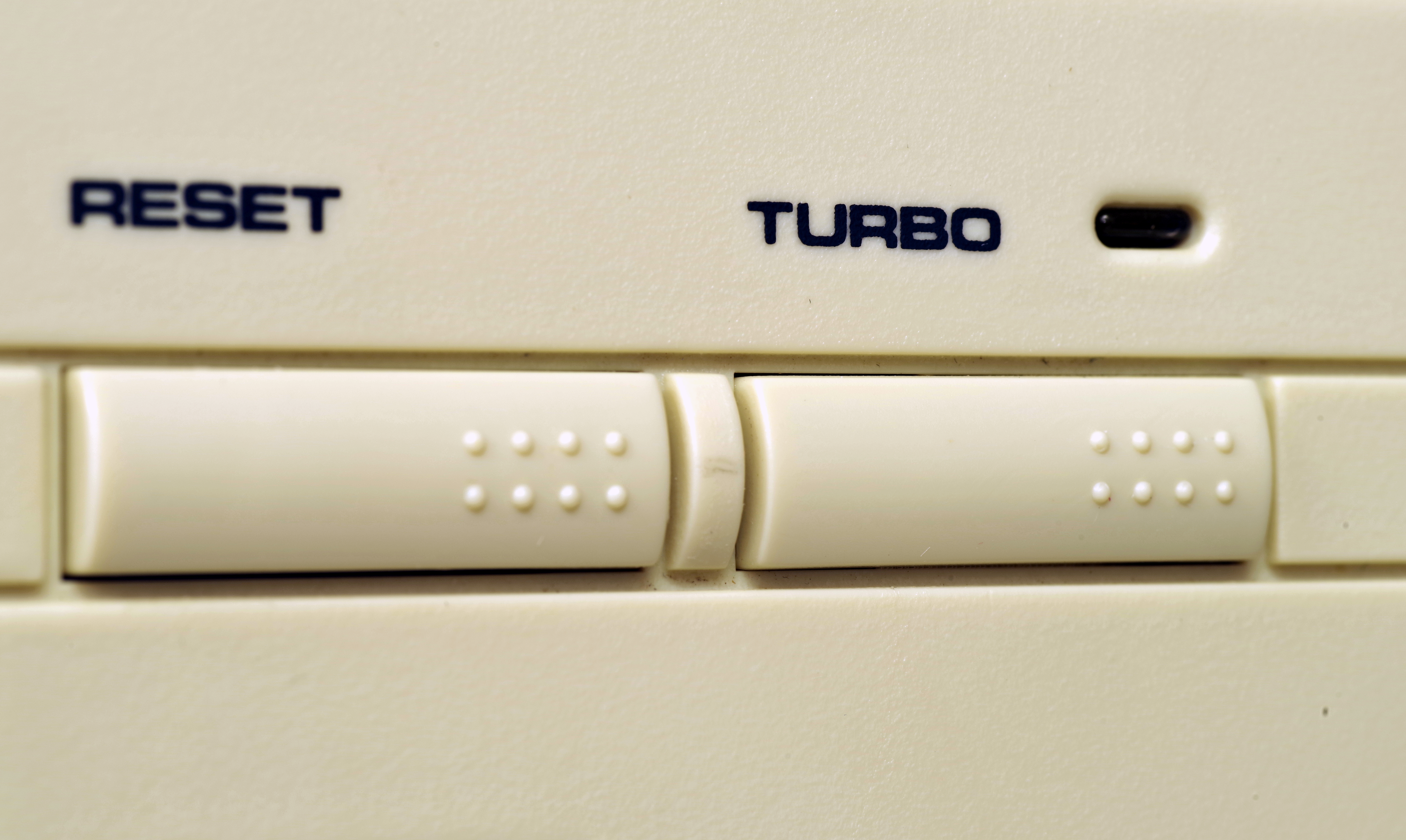
Case buttons including turbo button

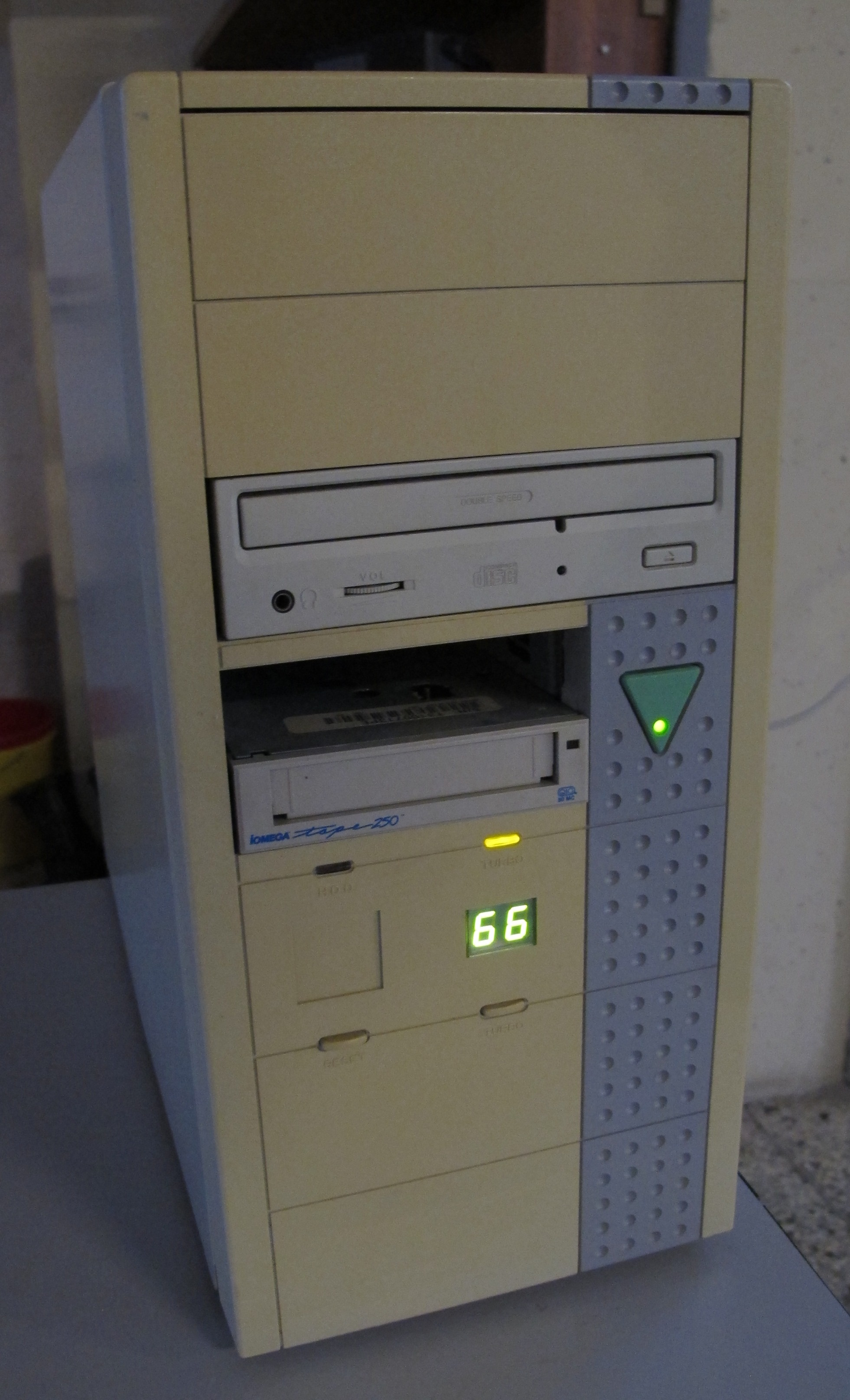
The LED display showing the CPU clock frequency, in MHz, of an Intel 80486 based computer. The turbo button is the small button below the segment display; the amber light above is a secondary indicator of the turbo button state.

On some older IBM PC–compatible computers, the turbo button selects one of two run states: the default "turbo" clock speed or a reduced speed closer to the Intel 8086 CPU. It was relatively common on computers using the Intel 80286, 80386 and 80486 processors, from the mid-1980s to mid-1990s. The name is inspired by the turbocharger, a device which increases an engine's power and efficiency. When pressed, the "turbo" button is intended to let a computer run at the highest speed for which it had been designed.

== Purpose ==
With the introduction of CPUs which ran faster than the original 4.77 MHz Intel 8088 used in the IBM Personal Computer, programs which relied on the CPU's frequency for timing were executing faster than intended. Games in particular were often rendered unplayable, due to the reduced time allowed to react to the faster game events. To restore compatibility, the "turbo" button was added. Disengaging turbo mode slows the system down to a state compatible with original 8086/8088 chips.

== Switching ==
On most systems, turbo mode was with the button pushed in, but since the button could often be wired either way, on some systems it was the opposite. The turbo button could be linked to a turbo LED or two-digit segmented display on the system case, although in some cases, the indicated frequency (in MHz) was not a measure of the actual processor clocks, but the two "fast" and "slow" display options set by jumpers on the motherboard.

Some systems also supported keyboard combinations Ctrl-Alt-+ and Ctrl-Alt-- for switching turbo mode on and off, such as the Packard Bell 486ES 3x3 (the 4x4 and MT models had a dedicated Turbo button). With all the 486ES models—those with and without a turbo button—the power light would show green in normal ("Turbo") mode, and orange in Slow mode. ITT Xtra used Ctrl-Alt-? to toggle.

Some keyboards had a turbo button as well, located near right ⇧ Shift. Unlike the turbo button that was common on computer cases, the turbo button on the keyboards did not control the clock rate of the CPU; rather, it controlled the keyboard repeat rate.

== Turbo display ==
The turbo display is used to display the current frequency (MHz) speed of the CPU, this is usually done by a two or three-digit digital LED display. The displayed speed can vary depending on the CPU's frequency, and the settings of the computer, however, it is not measuring the frequency of the CPU, it displays preset numbers when turbo is turned on or off, and these numbers can be changed with two (or three) banks of jumpers on the back of the display, each bank changing each digit, as their purpose is to connect LEDs in the display to (or disconnect from) power. The layout of the banks can vary.

== History ==
The first computer system to feature a turbo button on the front of the case was Eagle Computer's Turbo XL. Released in May 1984, the Eagle Turbo featured an Intel 8088-2 processor, with the turbo button switching its clock speed between 4.77 MHz (the clock speed of the original IBM PC) and 7.16 MHz. The Turbo XL was presaged by other faster IBM PC compatibles which had toggle switches on the back of the cases to switch between clock speeds.

The feature was relatively common on systems running 286 to 486 CPUs, and less common on Pentium-era computers. The frequency displays largely disappeared or were reprogrammed to display "HI"/"LO", "99", or were replaced with a three-digit display when CPU speeds reached 100 MHz, since most systems only had a two-digit display.

As new computers continued to get faster and had a wide variety of available speeds, it became impossible for software to rely on specific CPU speed. As software began to rely on other timing methods, the turbo feature became mostly irrelevant to new programs. In 1996, Computer Reseller News declared the turbo button "long since useless" and "[a] vestige of earlier times".

== Software implementations ==
While the implementation of an actual hardware turbo button has disappeared on modern machines, software developers have compensated with software replacements. One example is DOSBox, which offers an adjustable emulation rate. Modern PCs that support ACPI power management may provide software controls to switch ACPI performance states or other CPU throttling modes. This is used for power saving or to prevent CPU overheating rather than for compatibility, as modern applications use the real-time clock for timing instead of the CPU clock.

== Inverted button behavior ==
Some computers wired the turbo button in a way that if the button is pressed in, the computer is running in the slower speed. While the turbo button can be configured this way, this is not the intended way of using the button, as the computer is intended to run at full speed when the button is pressed in, hence the name turbo. This caused a lot of confusion and misunderstanding about the purpose and naming of the button in retro computer forums and communities. This issue can be solved by reconnecting the wires in the correct way on either the display, or on the motherboard of the computer. If the turbo LED is on, that always means the CPU is running at full speed, regardless of how the switch is wired.
