= CP-300 =

Personal microcomputer

CP 300
- Manufacturer: Prológica
- Type: Home computer
- Released: 1983; 43 years ago
- Operating system: BASIC Level II (TRS-80 compatible); DOS-500 (TRS-DOS compatible)
- CPU: Zilog Z80A @ 2.0 MHz
- Memory: 64 KB RAM 16 KB ROM
- Removable storage: Cassette tape, floppy disk (optional)
- Display: PAL-M or monitor video out; 32x16, 64x16, 128x48
- Sound: Beeper
- Backward compatibility: TRS-80 Model III

CP 300 was a personal microcomputer produced by Prológica, a computer company located in Brazil, and introduced in 1983.

== General information ==
It was compatible in software and hardware with the American TRS-80 Model III, and could be considered a domestic and cheaper version of the CP 500, since it was supplied with only one cabinet containing the CPU and a chiclet keyboard. The power supply was external to the cabinet.

== Technical details ==
The CP 300 had 16 KB of ROM and 64 KB of RAM. Its keyboard had 54 keys with auto-repeat function, including two red keys that, when pressed together, forced a reset of the machine.

The display was limited to two text modes of 32x16 or 64x16 characters, and a semigraphic mode of 128x48 pixels.

Sound was generated by an internal cabinet speaker with a volume control at the back.

Expansion capability was limited to a connector located at the back of the machine. In terms of connectivity, it had a TV output (RF modulator, channel 3), a monitor output, and a cassette interface.

Audio cables were supplied with the computer for connection to a regular tape recorder, that could be operated at 500/1500 baud with remote relay activation.

Additionally, it was possible to connect up to four external 5.25" floppy drives, allowing the machine to run DOS-500 (TRS-DOS compatible).

== Accessories ==
- CP 300 Printer.

== Bibliography ==
- Micro Computador - Curso Básico. Rio de Janeiro: Rio Gráfica, 1984, v. 1, pp. 49–50.
- ABREU, Carlos Alberto C. 77 programas para linha TRS-80. Rio de Janeiro: Microkit, 1985.
