= Prológica Indústria e Comércio de Microcomputadores =

Brazilian microcomputer company

- Company type: Sociedade Anônima
- Traded as: Prológica
- Industry: Computer System; Software
- Founded: 1976; 50 years ago
- Founder: Leonardo Bellonzi; Joseph Blumenfeld
- Defunct: 1995; 31 years ago
- Headquarters: São Paulo, Brazil
- Key people: Geraldo Coen; Carlos Gauch
- Products: Computer Monitors; Personal Computer; Laptops
- Number of employees: 1,500 (1984)
- Subsidiaries: Microperiférico; Promel; Editele; Nova Eletrônica

Prológica Indústria e Comércio de Microcomputadores, commonly shortened to Prológica, was an influential Brazilian microcomputer company that reached its peak in the mid-1980s, when it ranked third among national companies in the sector.

== History ==
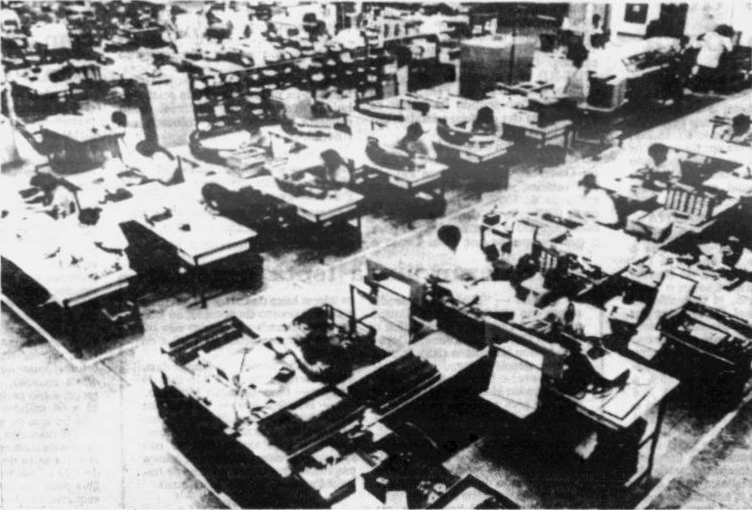
Prológica's office interior in 1984

Founded in 1976, the company initially commercialized machines for accounting use, namely the MCA-100 and Alpha Disk. The first models had an Intel 8080 processor, and in the early months the company even managed to get a partnership with Olivetti.

The company later specialized in producing products similar to the American TRS-80 series of microcomputers, under the general name of "CP" (for "Computador Pessoal" in Portuguese, "Personal Computer" in English).

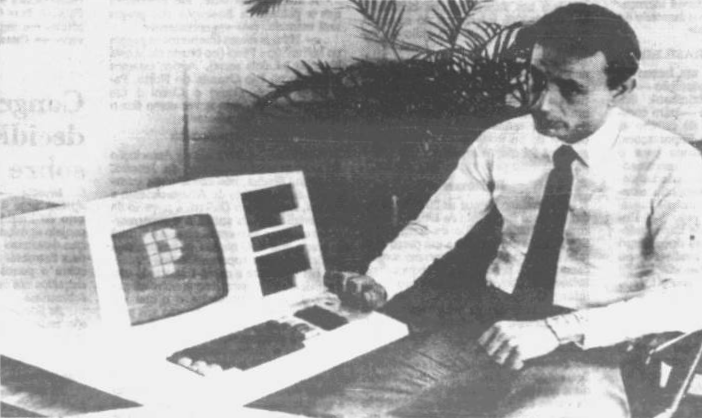
A photo of Carlos Roberto Gauch, Prológica's vice-president, next to one the company's computers, the CP-500

One of its biggest successes in the professional field was the CP 500, compatible with the TRS-80 Model III.

In 1990, the company was sued by Microsoft for creating SO16 ("Sistema Operativo 16"), an operating system based on MS-DOS.

== Line of products ==
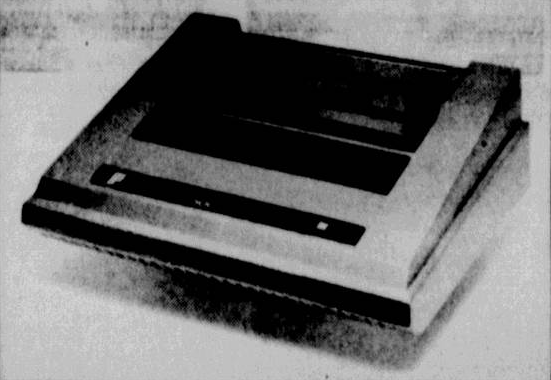
P 500, a printer produced by Prológica in the 80s.

A not extensive list of Prológica's products:

=== Home computers ===
- NE-Z80 (Sinclair ZX80 clone)
- NE-Z8000 (1982, Sinclair ZX81 clone)
- CP 200 (1982, Sinclair ZX81 compatible)
- CP 200 S (1982, Sinclair ZX81 compatible, alternate case)
- CP 300 (1983, TRS-80 Model III compatible)
- CP 400 COLOR (1984, Color Computer 2 compatible)
- CP 400 COLOR II (1985, better keyboard)

=== Personal computers ===
- Sistema 600
- Sistema 700 (1981, DOS-700 - CP/M-80 compatible)
- CP 500 (1982, TRS-80 Model III compatible)
- CP 500/M^{80} (1985)
- CP 500/M^{80C} (1986)
- Solution 16 (1986, SO16 - MS-DOS 2.11 compatible)
- CP 500 Turbo (1987, faster CPU)
- SP 16
- AT SP 286
- AT SP 386
- AT SP 486

=== Peripherals ===
- CP 450 (floppy disk drive interface)
- Printer P 500
- Printer P 600
- Printer P 700
- Printer P 720
- Printer Antares 400
