= Sistema 700 =

Brazilian microcomputer

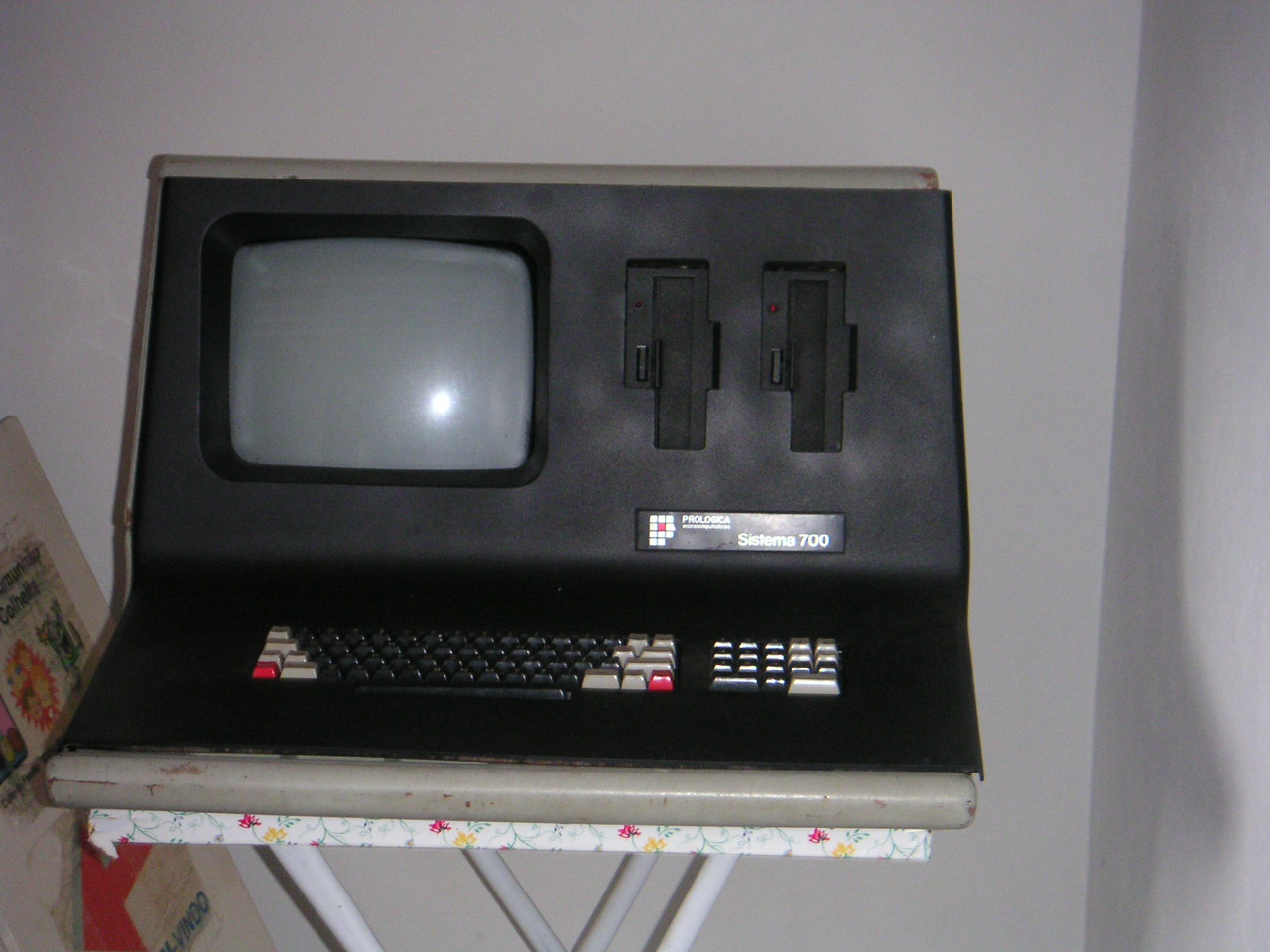
- Manufacturer: Prológica
- Type: Microcomputer
- Released: 1981; 45 years ago
- Introductory price: US$399 (equivalent to $1,413 in 2025)
- Discontinued: 1985; 41 years ago
- Operating system: DOS-700 (CP/M 80)
- CPU: 2x Zilog Z80A @ 4.0 MHz
- Memory: 64 KiB RAM
- Storage: Audio cassette, Floppy disk
- Display: 80 × 24 characters text display; 12-inch monochrome CRT; PAL-M video out (built-in RCA connector)
- Connectivity: Two RS-232 serial ports

Sistema 700 was a personal professional microcomputer, introduced by the Brazilian computer company Prológica in 1981.

== General information ==
The machine was based on the Intertec Superbrain and had similar characteristics: based on the Zilog Z80A 8-bit, 4MHz microprocessor, it had 64 KiB RAM configuration and two 5 1/4-inch floppy disk drives with capacity for up to 320 KiB of storage.

Its operating system was DOS-700, a version adapted by Prologica's software engineering department from the CP/M-80.

It achieved relative commercial success in financial, database and engineering applications. Due to the compatibility with the popular CP/M system, various applications like Fortran ANS, BASIC compiler, COBOL ANSI 74 compiler, Algol, Pascal, PL/I, MUMPS/M, RPG, Faturol C could be used. Other applications like word processors (WordStar), spreadsheets (CalcStar) and databases (DataStar and dBase II) were also compatible. Your applications could be programmed in BASIC, Cobol-80 and Fortran.

== Models ==
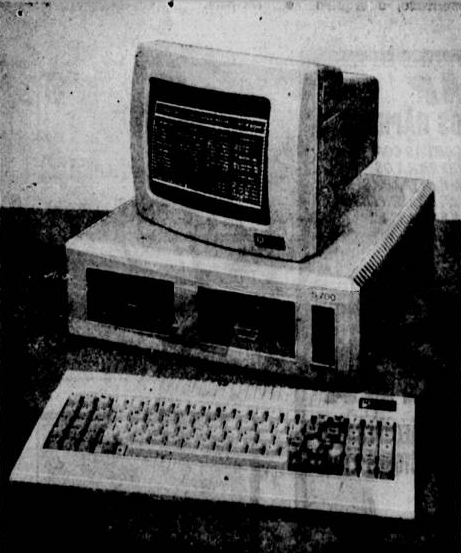
The third generation Sistema 700, named Sistema 700 Modular

=== Sistema 700 (1981) ===
Initial model announced in 1981, but never went into production (vaporware).

=== Super Sistema 700 (1981) ===
Final version with graphite-colored cabinet and rounded contours.

=== Sistema 700 Modular (1985) ===
In August 1985, Prológica released the third generation of the Sistema 700, named the Sistema 700 Modular. It had a larger and more durable keyboard, a built-in magnetic disk, and 10 function keys . It had 64 kilobytes of RAM and 4 kilobytes of EPROM storage. It was equipped with three microprocessors, one of which, an Intel 8035, was dedicated to controlling the keyboard. It was 10% cheaper than the previous model.

== Data Storage ==
Data storage was done in audio cassette. Audio cables were supplied with the computer for connection with a regular tape recorder.

== Accessories ==
P-720 Printer.

== Bibliography ==
- Micro Computador – Curso Básico. Rio de Janeiro: Rio Gráfica, 1984, vol. 1, pp. 49–50.
