= Solution 16 =

Brazilian personal computer

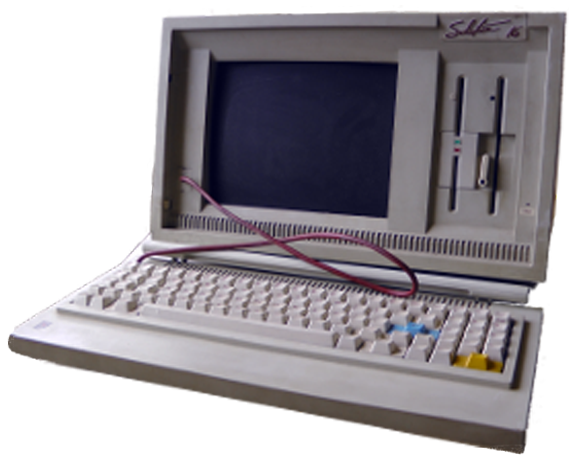
- Developer: Luciano Deviá
- Manufacturer: Prológica
- Type: Personal Computer
- Released: 1986; 40 years ago
- Discontinued: 1988; 38 years ago
- Operating system: SO16 (MS-DOS 2.11)
- CPU: Intel 8088 @ 4.77 MHz
- Memory: 256 KB RAM 16 KB ROM
- Storage: Audio cassette, Floppy disk
- Display: Monochrome monitor with RGBI
- Graphics: Color Graphics Adapter
- Sound: PC speaker 1-channel square-wave/1-bit digital (PWM-capable)
- Dimensions: 450 millimetres (18 in) wide by 375 millimetres (14.8 in) deep
- Weight: 16.5 kilograms (36 lb)

Solution 16 was the first Brazilian all-in-one PC, introduced by Prológica in 1986.

== General information ==
Based on the Intel 8088 was launched in the national market as the first 16-bit 4.77 MHz microprocessor integrated computer in the market, it had 254 KB RAM configuration expandable up to 512 KB, and two 5-1/4" floppy disk drives with capacity for up to 320 KB of storage.

== SO 16 operating system ==
The Solution 16 came with an operating system named SO16 (portuguese for "Sistema Operacional 16" meaning "Operating System 16"). This was a translated copy of MS-DOS 2.11, which was the first to support hard disks, directories, and character tables for international languages. Microsoft filed a lawsuit in Brazil, accusing the manufacturer of piracy, and later forced the company to pass on a percentage of the profits made with the software, which ended up putting the company in financial difficulties.

== Data Storage ==
Two floppy disk drives, double density, double-sided, 360 KB. Audio cables were supplied with the computer for connection with a regular tape recorder.
