= RAM pack =

RAM expansion cartridge

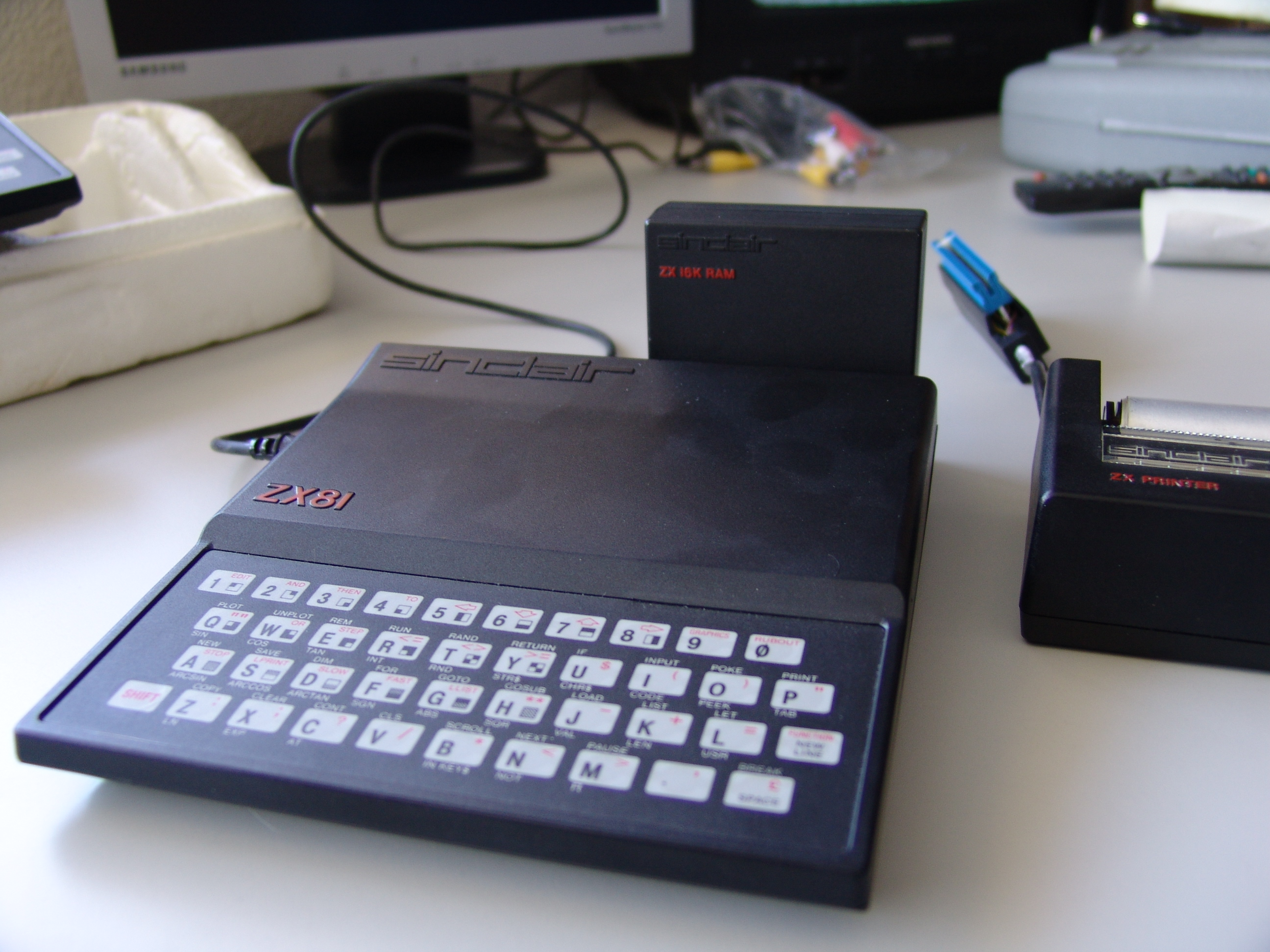
Sinclair ZX81 with 16 KB "RAM pack" expansion attached at the rear

RAM pack, RAMpack, RAM expansion cartridge, RAM expansion unit (REU), memory expansion pak and memory module are some of the most common names given to various self-contained units or cartridges that expand a computer, games console or other device's own internal RAM in a user-friendly manner.

Such units are generally designed to be installable by an end-user with little technical knowledge, often simply by plugging them into an expansion or cartridge slot easily accessible at the rear of the machine (e.g. the Sinclair ZX81 or the VTech Laser 200), or via a user-accessible hatch (e.g. the Atari 800's CX852 and CX853 modules or the Nintendo 64 Expansion Pak).

The ZX81 16K RAM expansion gained particular notoriety for the "RAM pack wobble" problem because it was top-heavy and only supported by the edge connector. This could lead to it falling out, crashing the ZX81 and losing any program or data currently in the computer's memory.

Examples of such memory expansions include:

- Jupiter Ace RAM Pack
- Sinclair ZX80 RAM pack units (available in 1–3 KB and later 16 KB)
- Sinclair ZX81 16KB RAM unit, commonly referred to as "RAM Pack" like its predecessor
- Atari 1064 Memory Module (expanded the Atari 600XL's 16 KB RAM to 64 KB)
- VIC-20 RAM cartridges officially available in 3 KB (with or without BASIC extension ROM), 8 KB, 16 KB, with 32 KB and 64 KB third-party cartridges also available
- Commodore REU, a series of RAM Expansion Units (REUs) for the Commodore 64 and Commodore 128 computers (128 KB, 256 KB and 512 KB capacities)
- Saturn carts, 1 or 4 MB of RAM, sold by SNK and Capcom respectively for use with their games.
- Nintendo 64 "Expansion Pak" expanded the N64's RAM from 4 to 8 MB
- Nintendo DS and DS Lite "Memory Expansion Pak" was supplied with the DS web browser software and adds 8 MB of RAM
