= CP-450 =

Floppy disk drive interface manufactured by Prológica,

CP 450
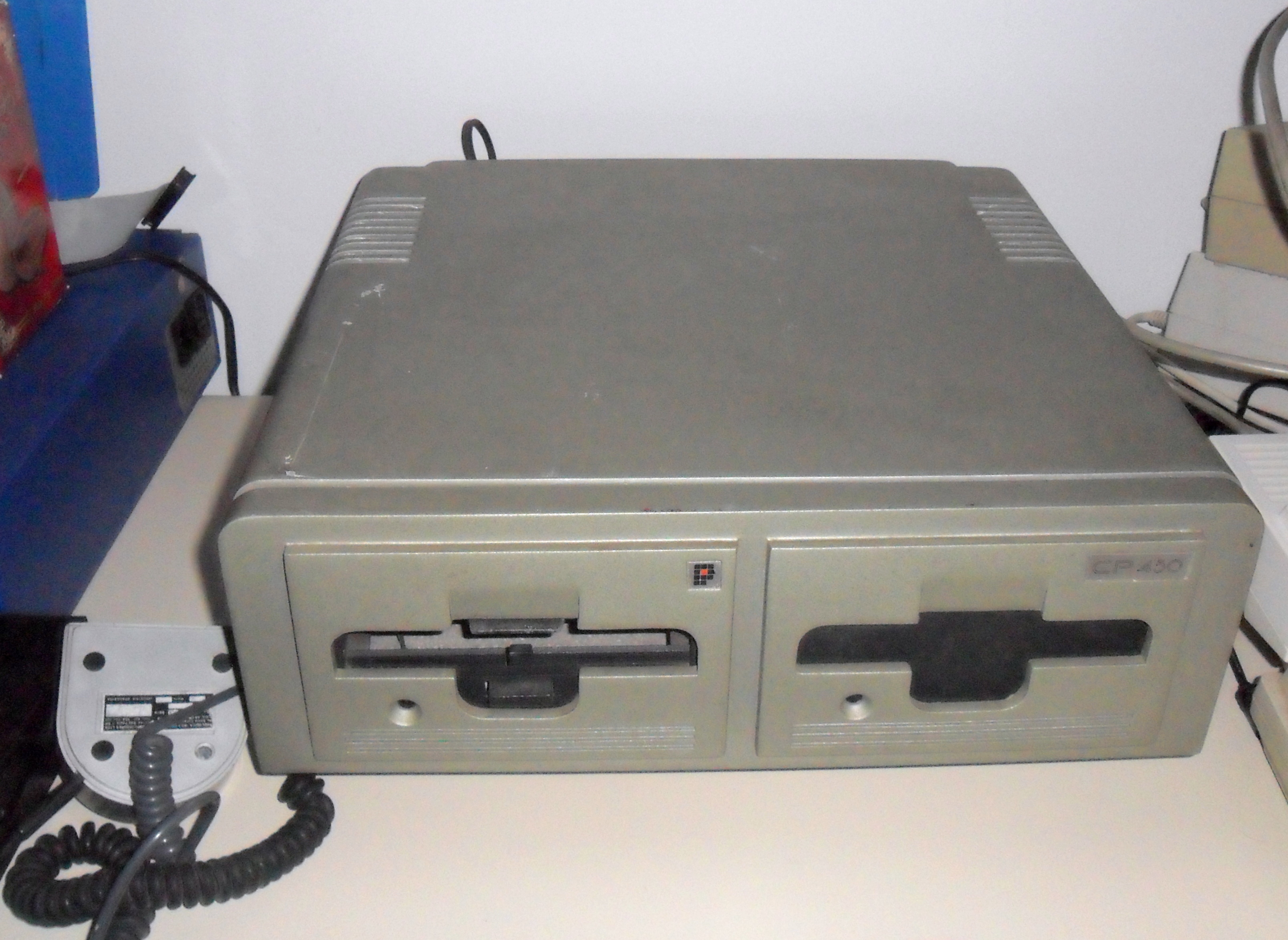
- Manufacturer: Prológica
- Type: floppy disk drive interface
- Released: 1984; 42 years ago
- Discontinued: 1986; 40 years ago
- Operating system: DOS-400
- Memory: 16 KB RAM

CP 450 was a large cabinet containing a floppy disk drive interface for the CP 400, manufactured by Prológica, a computer company located in Brazil.

== General information ==
The device was similar to those used by the TRS-80 Color Computer.

The standard operating system is DOS-400, an adapted and renamed copy of disk Extended Color BASIC (DECB or RSDOS). It was also possible to run other operating systems, such as Microware OS-09 and TSC Flex9. Using OS-9 allowed the user to access all 64 KB of RAM available on this particular version of the CP 400.

It used 5¼-inch single sided floppy discs capable of storing around 218 KB.

The CP 450 units stopped being manufactured at the end of 1986, along with other accessories suitable for the CP 400.

== Bibliography ==
- Micro Computador - Curso Básico. Rio de Janeiro: Rio Gráfica, 1984, v. 1, pp. 49–50.
- ABREU, Carlos Alberto C. 77 programas para linha TRS-80. Rio de Janeiro: Microkit, 1985.
