= ZX81 =

1981 home computer

Sinclair ZX81
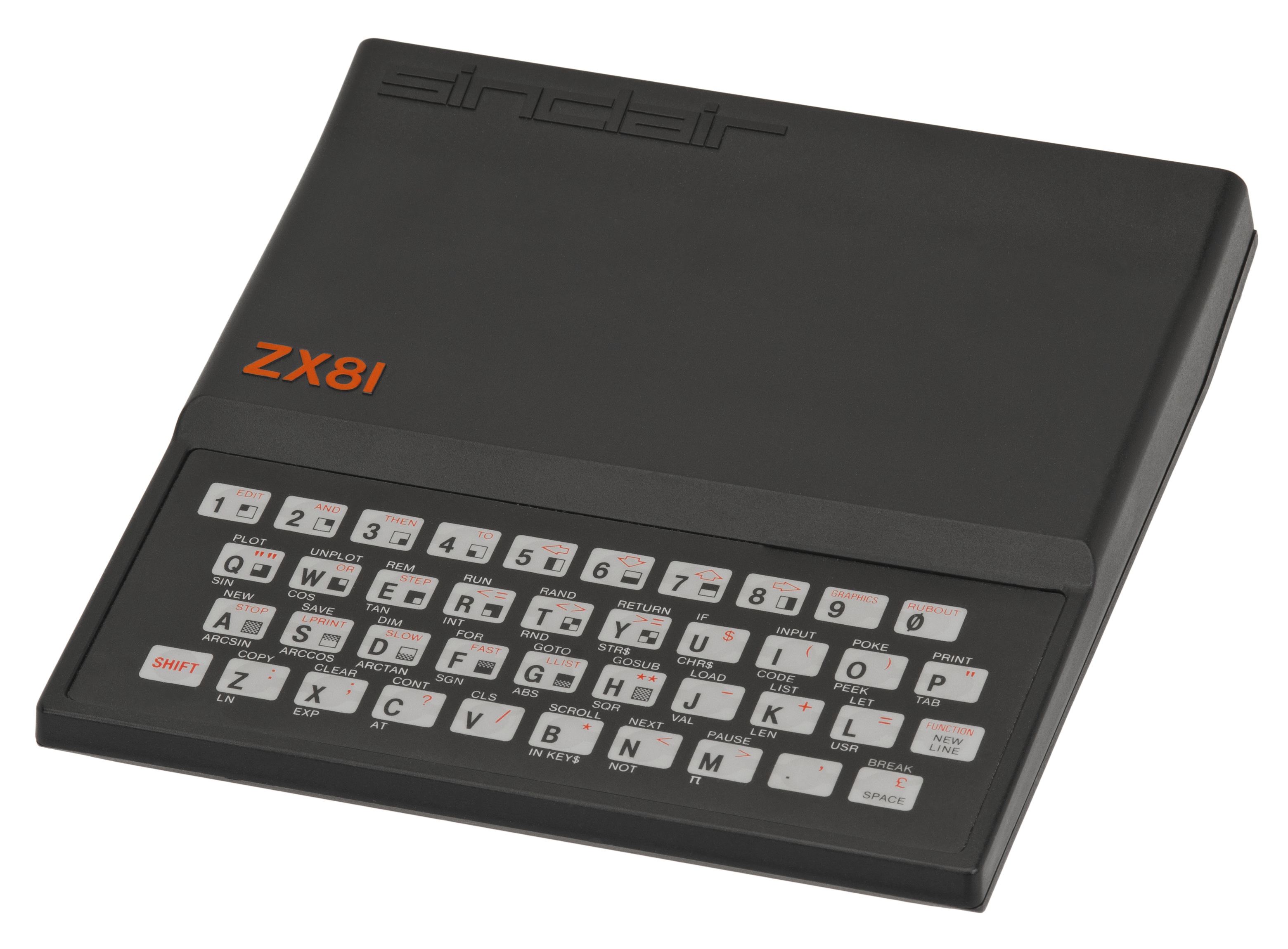
- Developer: Sinclair Research
- Manufacturer: Timex Corporation
- Type: Home computer
- Released: 5 March 1981; 45 years ago
- Introductory price: £49.95 kit, £69.95 assembled (£193–270/$264–370 at 2025 prices)
- Discontinued: 1984
- Units sold: More than 1.5 million
- Operating system: Sinclair BASIC
- CPU: Z80 @ 3.25 MHz
- Memory: 1 KB (64 KB max. 56 KB usable)
- Storage: External Compact Cassette recorder at a claimed 250 bit/s or an average 300 bit/s
- Display: Monochrome display on UHF television
- Graphics: 24 lines × 32 characters or 64 × 48 pixels graphics mode
- Power: 9V DC
- Dimensions: 167 millimetres (6.6 in) wide by 175 millimetres (6.9 in) deep
- Weight: 350 grams (12 oz)
- Predecessor: ZX80
- Successor: ZX Spectrum
- Related: Timex Sinclair 1000, Timex Sinclair 1500

The ZX81 is a home computer developed by Sinclair Research and manufactured in Dundee, Scotland, by Timex Corporation. It was launched in the United Kingdom in March 1981 as the successor to Sinclair's ZX80 and designed to be a low-cost introduction to home computing for the general public. It was hugely successful; more than 1.5 million units were sold. In the United States it was initially sold as the ZX-81 under licence by Timex. Timex later produced its own versions of the ZX81: the Timex Sinclair 1000 and Timex Sinclair 1500. Unauthorized ZX81 clones were produced in several countries.

The ZX81 was designed to be small, simple, and above all, inexpensive. Video output is for a television set rather than a dedicated monitor. It contains only four silicon chips and 1 KB of RAM. It has no power switch or moving parts, excepting a VHF TV channel selector switch in some models. It has a pressure-sensitive membrane keyboard. Programs and data are loaded and saved onto compact audio cassettes. The ZX81's limitations prompted a market in third-party peripherals to improve its capabilities. Its distinctive case and keyboard brought designer Rick Dickinson a Design Council award.

The ZX81 could be bought by mail order preassembled or, for a lower price, in kit form. It was the first inexpensive mass-market home computer to be sold by high street stores, led by W. H. Smith and soon many other retailers. The ZX81 marked the point when computing in Britain became an activity for the general public rather than businessmen and electronics hobbyists. It produced a community of enthusiasts, some of whom founded businesses developing software and hardware for the ZX81. Many went on to have roles in the British computer industry. The ZX81's commercial success made Sinclair Research one of Britain's leading computer manufacturers and earned a fortune and an eventual knighthood for the company's founder, Sir Clive Sinclair. The system was discontinued in 1984.

== Features ==
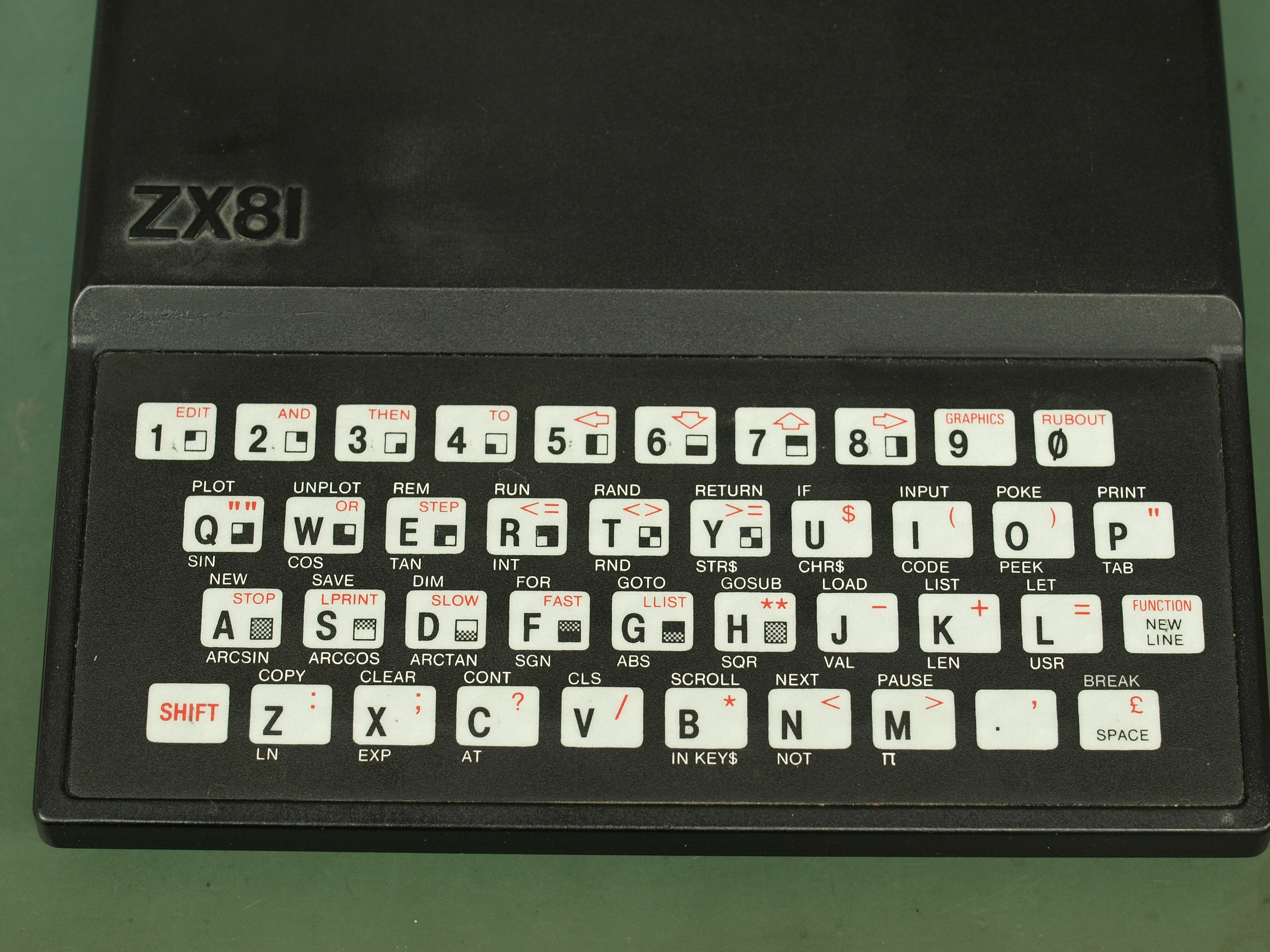
Sinclair ZX81 PCB Revision 3 keyboard

The ZX81 has a base configuration of 1 KB of on-board RAM that can officially be expanded externally to 16 KB. Its single circuit board is housed inside a wedge-shaped plastic case measuring 167 millimetres (6.6 in) wide by 40 millimetres (1.6 in) high. The memory is provided by either a single 4118 (1024 bit × 8) or two 2114 (1024 bit × 4) RAM chips. There are only three other onboard chips: a 3.5 MHz Z80A 8-bit microprocessor from NEC, an uncommitted logic array (ULA) chip from Ferranti, and an 8 KB ROM providing a simple Sinclair BASIC interpreter. The entire machine weighs just 350 grams (12 oz). Early versions of the external RAM cartridge contain 15 KB of memory using an assortment of memory chips, while later versions contain 16 KB chips with the lowest addressed kilobyte disabled.

The front part of the case is an integrated 40-key membrane keyboard. It is mechanically simple, consisting of 40 pressure-pad switches and 8 diodes under a plastic overlay, connected in a matrix of 8 rows and 5 columns.

The ZX81 uses a QWERTY keyboard layout displaying 20 graphic and 54 inverse video characters. However ZX81 BASIC commands are not typed in letter by letter, instead each key has up to five key functions. This is how the user displays the ZX81's BASIC keywords, functions, mathematical operations, and graphics.

The ZX81 key's function is determined by a combination of context in the command and mode selection e.g. SHIFT and FUNCTION keys to select the under key keyboard functions. For example, the P key combines the letter P, the " character, and the BASIC commands PRINT and TAB.

Context mode feedback is displayed by the cursor displaying an inverted letter;

- K for Keywords (above key),
- L for Letters,
- F for Functions (under key) or
- G for Graphics characters.

The fact that to effect a RUBOUT or backspace/delete operation took 2 key presses encouraged ZX81 programmers to be brief and type carefully when entering text or code.

The ZX81's primary input/output is delivered via four sockets on the left side of the case. The machine uses an ordinary UHF television set to deliver a monochrome picture via a built-in RF modulator. It can display 24 lines of 32 characters each, and by using the selection of 2 × 2 block character graphics from the machine's character set offers an effective 64 × 44 pixel graphics mode, also directly addressable via BASIC using the PLOT and UNPLOT commands, leaving 2 lines free at the bottom. Two 3.5 mm jacks connect the ZX81 to the EAR (output) and MIC (input) sockets of an audio cassette recorder, enabling data to be saved or loaded. This stores each data bit as a number of pulses followed by an inter-bit silence of 1300 μs. Each pulse is a 150 μs 'high' then a 150 μs 'low'. A '0' bit consists of four pulses while a '1' bit is nine pulses, so the baud rate varies between 400 bps (50 Bps) for all '0's and 250 bps (31.25 Bps) for all '1's. A file with equal amounts of '0's and '1's would be stored at 307 bps (38 Bps). This provides a somewhat temperamental storage medium for the machine, which has no internal non-volatile storage. The ZX81 requires 420 mA of current at 7–11 V DC, delivered via a custom 9 V Sinclair DC power supply.

The ULA chip, described by the ZX81 manual as the "dogsbody" of the system, has a number of key functions that competing computers share between multiple chips and integrated circuits. These comprise the following:

- Synchronising the screen display;
- Generating a 6.5 MHz clock, from which a 3.25 MHz clock is derived for the processor;
- Outputting an audio signal to a cassette recorder in SAVE mode;
- Processing the incoming cassette audio signal in LOAD mode;
- Sensing keystrokes;
- Using memory addresses provided by the CPU to decide when ROM and RAM should be active;
- Controlling general system timing.

The ZX81's built-in RF modulator can output a video picture to a UHF 625-line television (used in the UK, Australia, and most western European countries). France and Luxembourg required a slightly modified version of the machine to match the positive video modulation of CCIR System L sets, while the United States and Canada required a resistor adding to link a ULA pin to ground and different modulator to cope with their 525-line VHF (NTSC) television systems. Both the ZX81 and its predecessor, the ZX80, have a significant drawback in the way that they handle visual output. Neither machine has enough processing power to run at full speed and simultaneously maintain the screen display. On the ZX80, this means that the screen goes blank every time the machine carries out a computation and causes a distracting flicker whenever a shorter computation – such as processing a keystroke – takes place.

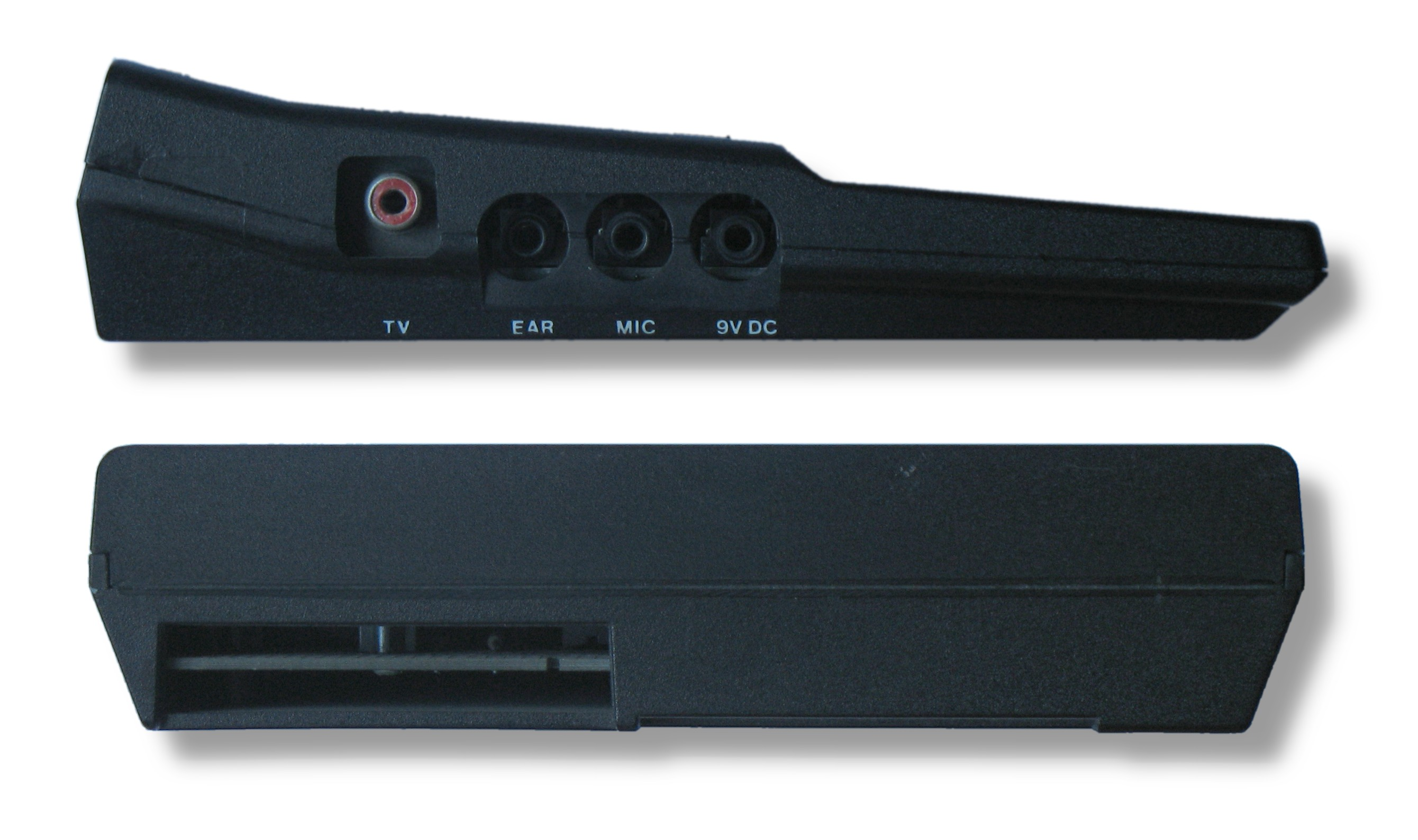
Left side and rear views of the ZX81, showing its edge connector, the three input/output sockets (TV, EAR, MIC) and the 9 V DC power socket

The ZX81's designers adopted an improved approach, involving the use of two modes called SLOW and FAST respectively. In SLOW mode, also called "compute and display" mode, the ZX81 concentrates on driving the display. It runs the current program for only about a quarter of the time – in effect slowing the machine down fourfold, although in practice the speed difference between FAST and SLOW modes depends on what computation is being done. In FAST mode, processing occurs continuously, but the display is abandoned to its own devices – equivalent to the ZX80's standard operating mode.

Another hardware quirk produced one of the most distinctive aspects of the ZX81's screen display – during loading or saving, moving zigzag stripes appear across the screen. The same pin on the ULA is used to handle the video signal and the tape output, producing the stripes as an interference pattern of sorts. The ULA cannot maintain the display during SAVE and LOAD operations, as it has to operate continuously to maintain the correct baud rate for data transfers. The interference produces the zigzag stripes.

The unexpanded ZX81's tiny memory presents a challenge to programmers. Simply displaying a full screen takes up to 793 bytes, the system variables take up another 125 bytes, and the program, input buffer and stacks need more memory on top of that. Nonetheless, ingenious programmers are able to achieve a surprising amount with just 1 KB. One example is 1K ZX Chess by David Horne, which includes most of the rules of chess in 672 bytes. The ZX81 conserves its memory to a certain extent by representing entire BASIC commands as one-byte tokens, stored as individual "characters" in the upper reaches of the machine's unique (non-ASCII) character set.

The edge connector or external interface at the rear of the ZX81 is an extension of the main printed circuit board. This provides a set of address, control, and data lines that can be used to communicate with external devices. Enthusiasts and a variety of third-party companies make use of this facility to create a wide range of add-ons for the ZX81.

=== Comparisons with other computing devices ===
The following table provides a comparison between the capabilities of the ZX81 and various other competing microcomputers that were available in June 1981, about the time that the first ZX81 orders were delivered. The prices given are as of June 1981 from Your Computer UK.

Device	RAM standard	Expandable to	CPU	Keyboard	BASIC	Sale price	Number of colours	Maximum resolution	Sound
Apple II Plus	16 KB	48 KB	MOS Technology 6502 @ 1 MHz (8-bit)	Typewriter	Integer only	£549	16	280 × 192 pixels	beeper
Atari 400	8 KB	48 KB	MOS Technology 6502 @ 1.78 MHz	Membrane	extra	£289	256	320 × 192 pixels	4 voice
PET	16 KB	40 KB	MOS Technology 6502 @ 1 MHz	Typewriter	MS Level I	£399	Monochrome	320 × 200 text only	beeper
VIC-20	5 KB	32 KB	MOS Technology 6502 @ 1.02 MHz	Typewriter	MS Level I	£189	8	176 × 184 pixels	4 voice
Video Genie	16 KB	48 KB	Zilog Z80 @ 1.76 MHz	Typewriter	MS Level II	£279	Monochrome	128 × 48 block	beeper
Compukit 101	1 KB	48 KB	MOS Technology 6502 @ 1 MHz	Typewriter	MS Level II	£149/£199 assembled	Monochrome	128 × 48 block	extra
TRS-80 Model I	4 KB	48 KB	Zilog Z80 @ 1.78 MHz (8-bit)	Typewriter	Restricted	£399	Monochrome	128 × 48 block	extra
Acorn Atom	2 KB	12 KB	MOS Technology 6502 @ 1 MHz	Typewriter	TinyBASIC hybrid	£140/£173 assembled	8	256 × 192 mono, 64 × 64 colour	beeper
MicroTan	1 KB	48 KB	MOS Technology 6502 @ 0.75 MHz	extra	extra	£65/£99 assembled	Monochrome	128 × 48 block	extra
TI-99/4A	16 KB	48 KB	TI TMS9900 @ 3.0 MHz (16-bit)	Typewriter	Restricted	£399	16	256 × 192 pixels	3 voices and white noise
ZX81 / TS1000	1 KB / 2 KB	64 KB (56 KB usable)	Zilog or NEC Z80 @ 3.25 MHz (8-bit)	Membrane	Sinclair-own (MS Level II equiv.)	£49/£69 assembled	Monochrome	64 × 48 block	No

N.B.: The PET includes monitor and cassette recorder. The Video Genie includes a built-in cassette recorder. The Compukit 101 is an Ohio Scientific SuperBoard made under licence in Britain. The Compukit 101 and MicroTan are kit computers and are not supplied with a case.
The Atari 400 and TRS-80 model I were officially only expandable to 16 KB, but expansion to 48 KB was available from third-party suppliers.
The ZX81 and the other systems referred to as having "block" graphics have a resolution of 256 × 192 pixels, there are 32 columns × 22 rows of text and graphics can be addressed in quarter character blocks.

== History ==
=== Background ===
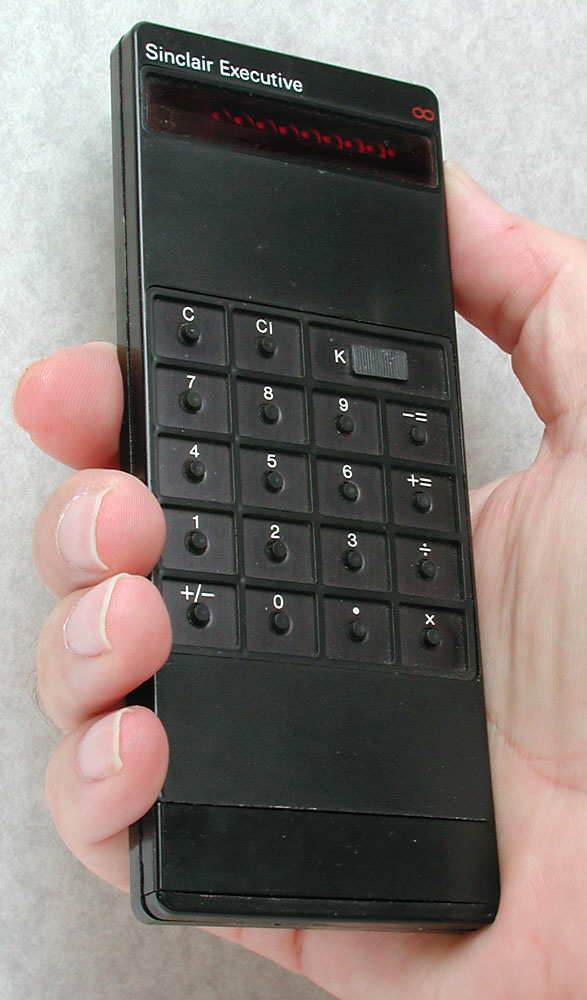
The Sinclair Executive "slimline" pocket calculator (1972)

Clive Sinclair, a former radio kit salesman, established his first company, Sinclair Radionics, in 1962. The company made its name producing a wide range of cheap electronics aimed at the hobbyist market. Its products include amplifiers, radios, multimeters and other items which were generally sold in kit form to hi-fi enthusiasts and other electronics hobbyists. The company entered a new market in 1972 when it launched the first "slimline" pocket calculator, the Sinclair Executive. Radionics followed up by launching a wide range of pocket calculators. The company's subsequent expansion made it Europe's biggest calculator manufacturer by 1975.

By the late 1970s, however, Sinclair Radionics was experiencing serious difficulties. It lost its ability to compete effectively in the calculator market following the launch of a new generation of Japanese-produced calculators with liquid-crystal displays, which were much more capable and power-efficient than Sinclair's LED calculators. Projects to develop a pocket television and digital watch turned out to be expensive failures. The company made losses of more than £350,000 in 1975–76, bringing it to the edge of bankruptcy. In July 1977 Radionics was rescued by a state agency, the National Enterprise Board (NEB), which recapitalised it, provided a loan facility and took effective control of the company by acquiring a 73% stake.

Clive Sinclair's relationship with the NEB was fraught due to conflicting notions about which direction the company should go. Radionics had begun a project to develop a home computer but the NEB wanted to concentrate on the instrument side of the business, which was virtually the only area where Radionics was profitable. Sinclair disagreed vehemently with what he characterised as the view "that there was no future in consumer electronics". This and other disputes led to Sinclair resigning from Radionics in July 1979.

While he was struggling with the NEB, Clive Sinclair turned to a "corporate lifeboat" in the shape of an existing corporate shell under his exclusive control – a company called Ablesdeal Ltd, which he had established in 1973 and later renamed Science of Cambridge. It became a vehicle through which he could pursue his own projects, free of the interference of the NEB. Despite his later success in the field, Sinclair saw computers as merely a means to an end. As he told the Sunday Times in April 1985, "We only got involved in computers in order to fund the rest of the business", specifically the development of the ultimately unsuccessful TV80 pocket television and C5 electric vehicle. In an interview with Practical Computing, Sinclair explained:

I make computers because they are a good market, and they are interesting to design. I don't feel bad about making them or selling them for money or anything, there is a demand for them and they do no harm; but I don't think they are going to save the world.

=== Precursors: the MK14 and ZX80 ===
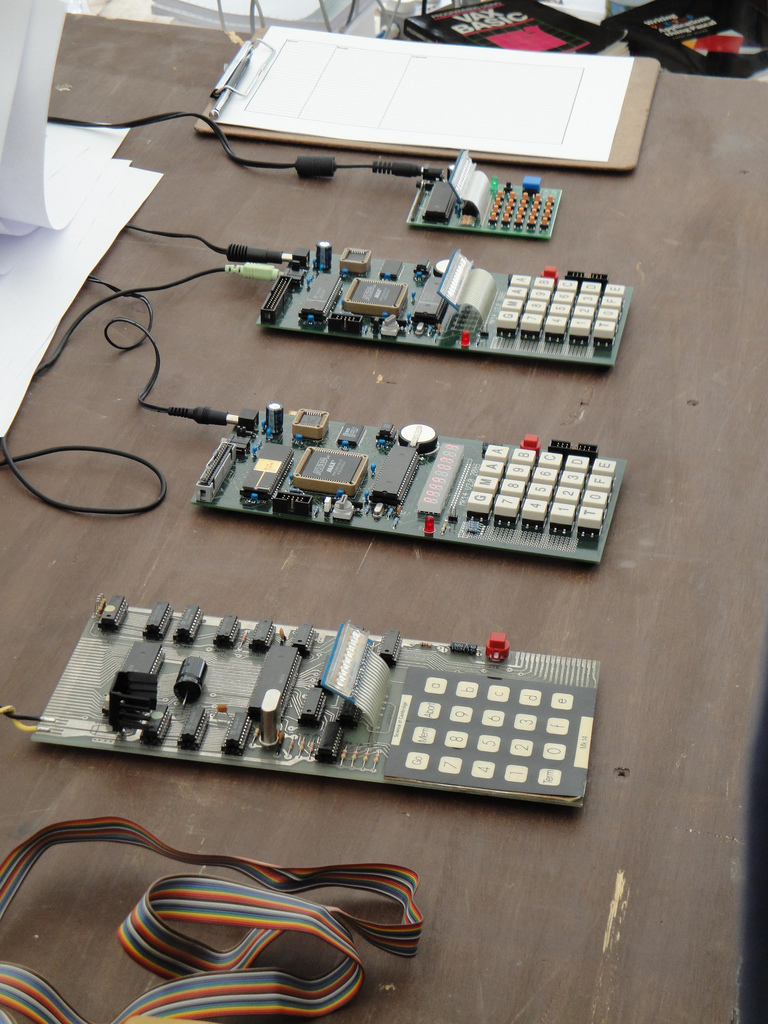
The Science of Cambridge MK14 (1978), sold in kit form, was Sinclair's first computer.

By the late 1970s, American companies were producing simple home computer kits such as the MITS Altair and IMSAI 8080. This aroused interest among electronics hobbyists in the UK but relatively high prices and lower disposable income reduced the appeal of the American products. New Scientist stated in 1977 that "the price of an American kit in dollars rapidly translates into the same figure in pounds sterling by the time it has reached the shores of Britain". Off-the-shelf personal computers were also available for the high end of the market but were extremely expensive; Olivetti's offering cost £2,000, and the Commodore PET, launched in 1979, sold for £700. There was nothing for the hobbyist at the low end of the market. Sinclair realised that this provided a useful commercial opportunity.

Sinclair's first home computer was the MK14, which was launched in kit form in June 1978. It was a long way from being a mass-market product. Its very name – MK standing for "Microcomputer Kit" – was indicative of its origins as a product developed by, and for, hobbyists.

It had no screen but instead used an LED segment display (though Science of Cambridge did produce an add-on module allowing it to be hooked up to a UHF TV); it had no case, consisting of an exposed circuit board; it had no built-in storage capabilities and only 256 bytes of memory; and input was via a 20-key hexadecimal keyboard.

Despite the limitations of the machine it sold a respectable 10–15,000 units; by comparison, the much more expensive Apple II had only sold 9,000 units in the United States, a much bigger market, in 1978. This success convinced Clive Sinclair that there was an untapped market for low-cost computers that could profitably be exploited.

Sinclair followed up the MK14 by producing the ZX80, at the time the world's smallest and cheapest computer, which was launched in January 1980 costing £99.95 (equivalent to £390 at 2021 prices.) The company conducted no market research whatsoever prior to the launch of the ZX80; according to Clive Sinclair, he "simply had a hunch" that the general public was sufficiently interested to make such a project feasible and went ahead with ordering 100,000 sets of parts so that he could launch at high volume.

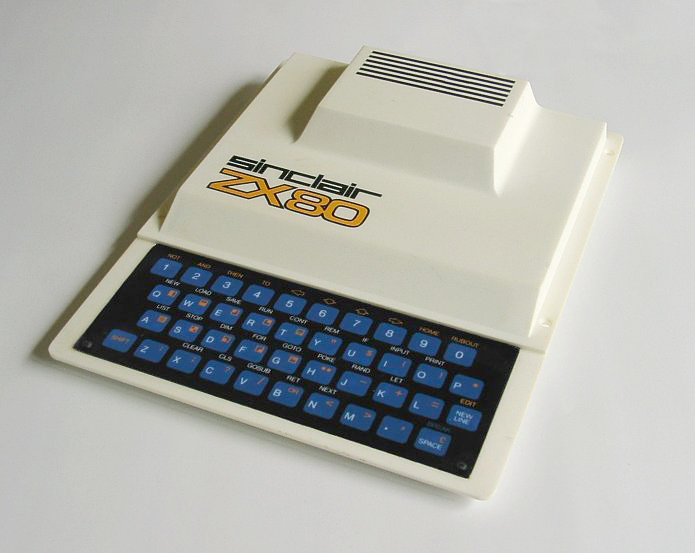
The Sinclair ZX80 (1980) is the immediate predecessor of the ZX81 and shares many design features.

The ZX80's design introduced many key features that were carried over to the ZX81; as Sinclair himself later said, "the ZX80 was very much a stepping stone to the ZX81". The design was driven entirely by the desired price – the machine had to cost less than £100 but still make a healthy profit. Its distinctive wedge-shaped white case concealing the circuitry and the touch-sensitive membrane keyboard were the brainchild of Rick Dickinson, a young British industrial designer who had recently been hired by Sinclair. As he later recalled of Sinclair's approach, "Everything was cost driven. The design was the face of the machine." The unconventional keyboard was the outcome of Sinclair's cost-cutting. It made use of a sheet of plastic, on which the keys were printed, overlaying a metallic circuit that registered when a key was pressed. This avoided the expense of providing a typewriter-style keyboard, though the design had many drawbacks when it came to usability and "feel".

Inside the case, there were many more similarities with the ZX81. Like its successor, it used the Z80A microprocessor and had only 1 KB of on-board RAM. It came with a specially written BASIC interpreter on a dedicated ROM chip and could use a television as a display. It relied on an ordinary cassette tape recorder for data storage. The main difference between the two machines lay in the internal software; when the ZX81 was released, ZX80 owners were able to upgrade by the relatively simple expedient of plugging a new ROM onto the circuit board.

The ZX80 was an immediate success, selling 20,000 units over the following nine months. Science of Cambridge was producing ZX80s at the rate of 9,000 a month by the end of 1980 and within 18 months of its launch the company had sold 100,000 units. The commercial success of the ZX80 made a follow-up product inevitable. The company was renamed Sinclair Computers in November 1980, reflecting its new focus, and became Sinclair Research in March 1981.

=== BBC Micro bid ===
The launch of the ZX81 was catalysed in part by the BBC Computer Literacy Project's plan to produce The Computer Programme TV series, to be broadcast in 1982, aimed at popularising computing and programming. The BBC intended to commission an existing manufacturer to provide it with a BBC-branded home computer to tie in with the series. When Clive Sinclair heard of the project in December 1980, he wrote to the BBC informing them that he would be announcing a new version of the ZX80, to be called the ZX81, in early 1981. It would remedy some of the ZX80's deficiencies and would be both cheaper and more advanced. Sinclair wanted the ZX81 to be a candidate for the BBC contract and lobbied for its adoption. He pointed out that there were already 40,000 users of the ZX80 and that by the time the series was broadcast there were likely to be upwards of 100,000 ZX81 users.

A prototype ZX81 was demonstrated to BBC representatives in January 1981, while Sinclair's local rival Acorn Computers put forward their proposed Proton computer, a design – of which a prototype did not yet exist – based on the Acorn Atom. To Sinclair's dismay, the contract to produce the BBC Micro went to Acorn, which launched the machine in January 1982. Paul Kriwaczek, the producer of The Computer Programme, explained his reservations in a March 1982 interview with Your Computer:

I would have been very reluctant for the BBC to sell something like the Sinclair [ZX81] because it is so limited. The Sinclair cannot be expanded; it is fundamentally a throw-away consumer product. Its usefulness lies in learning about programming, but I do not believe that the future of computers lies in everyone learning to program in BASIC.

Sinclair was critical of the BBC's decision, accusing it of incompetence and arrogance. Shortly after Acorn won the BBC contract the Government issued a recommended list of computers, including the BBC Micro and Research Machines 380Z, that schools could purchase, with the aid of a grant, for half price; Sinclair's computers were not included on the list. Sinclair responded by launching his own half-price deal, offering schools the chance to buy a ZX81 and 16 KB RAM pack for £60, plus a ZX Printer at half price, for a total cost of £90. As the cheapest Government-approved system was £130, this was an attractive offer for some schools and about 2,300 bought Sinclair's package, although 85% adopted the BBC Micro.

=== Development and manufacture ===
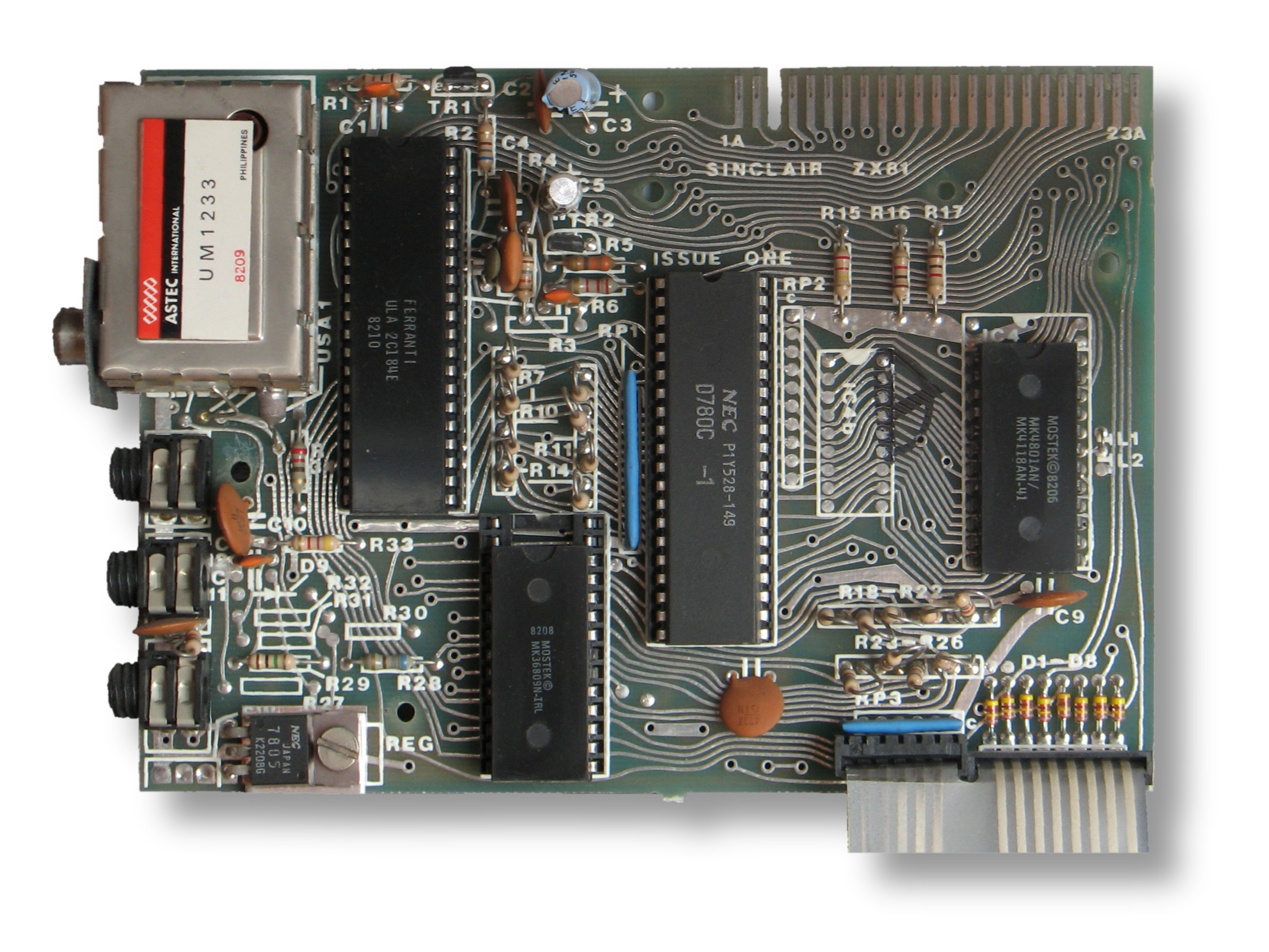
The ZX81 motherboard, Issue One version. The Ferranti ULA is on the left of the image and the NEC Z80 processor is in the centre. The TV output modulator is on the top left. At the bottom right is a ribbon cable connecting to the membrane keyboard.

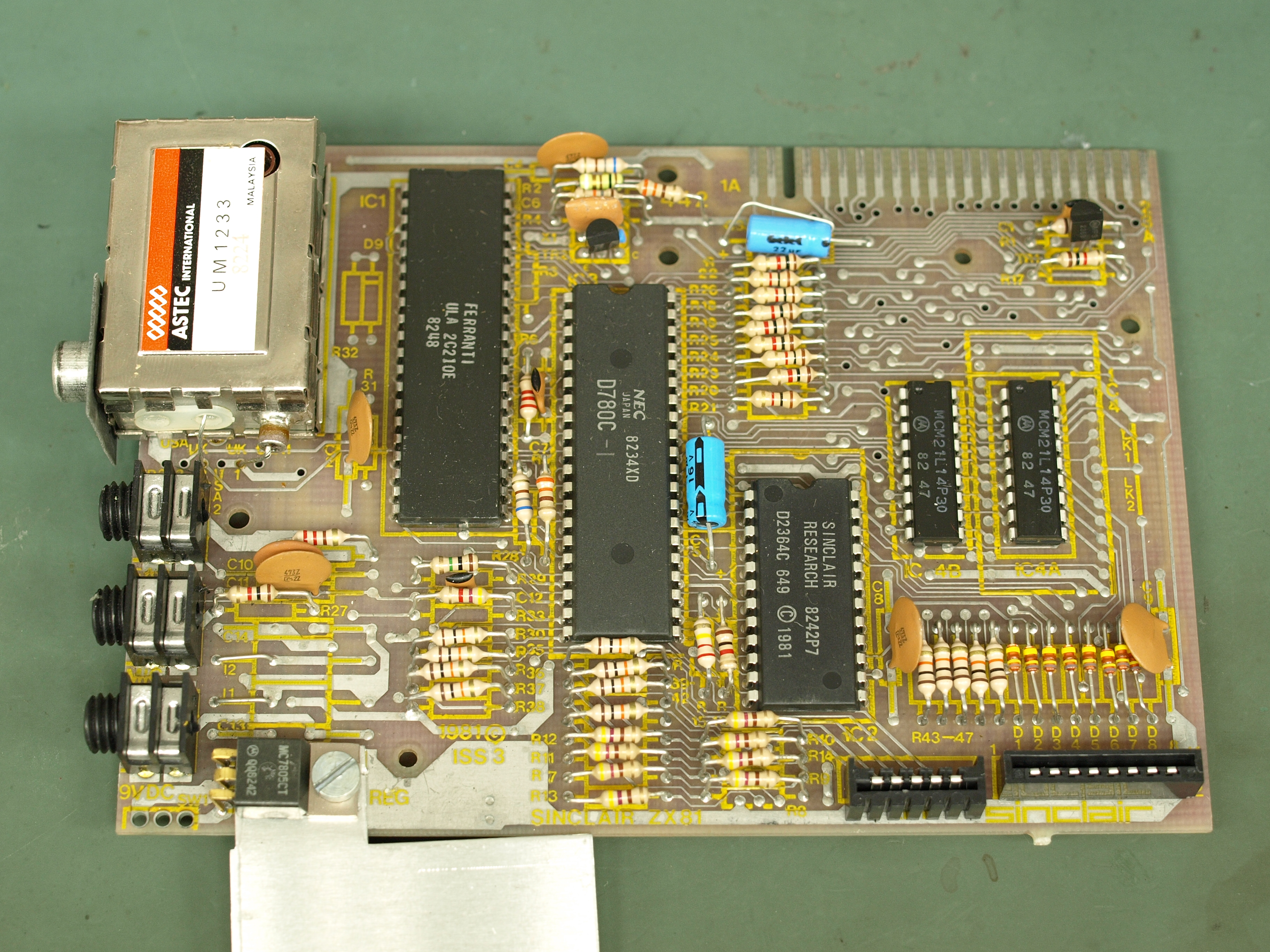
Revised Sinclair ZX81 PCB Revision 3 top side

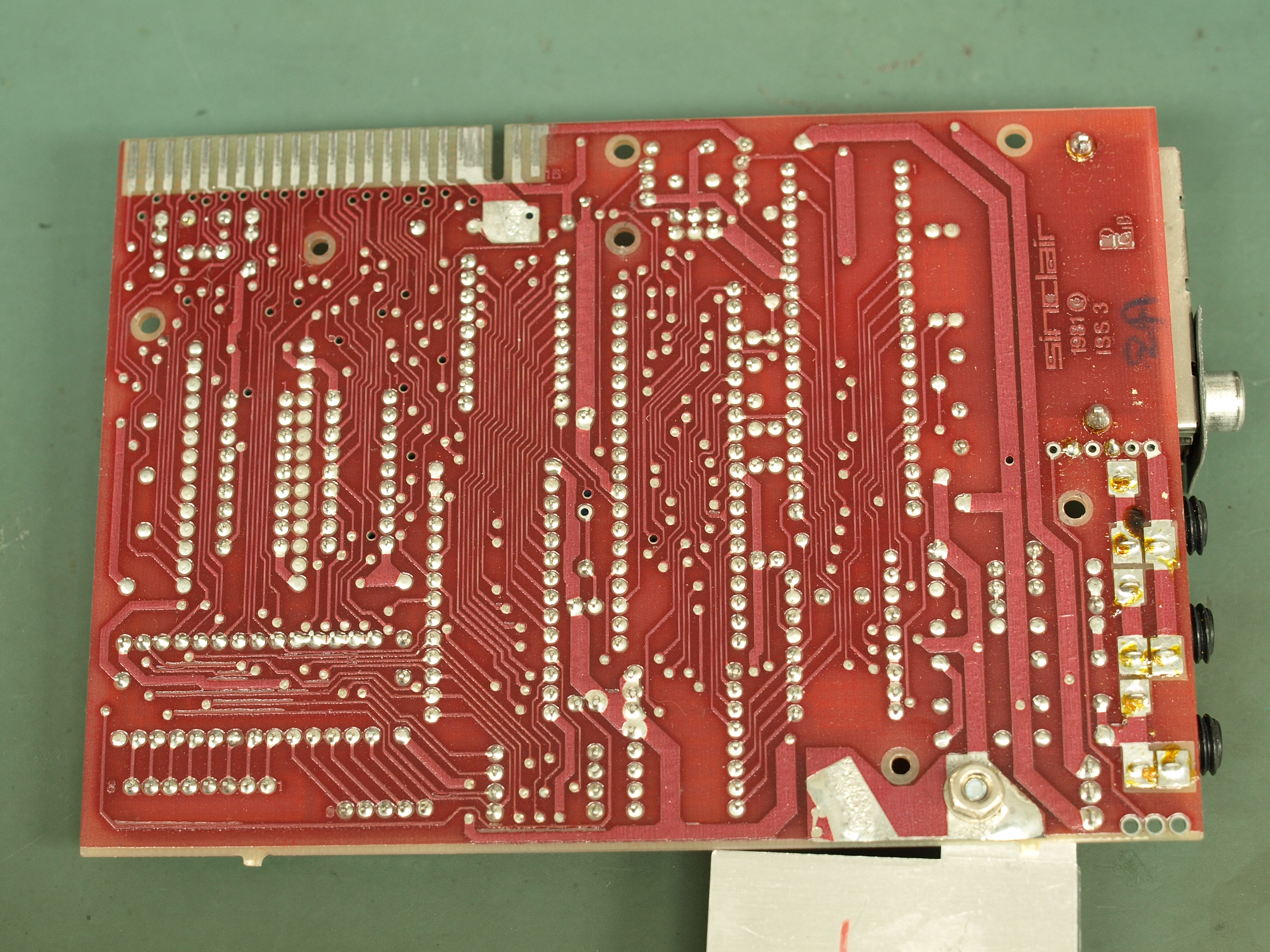
Sinclair ZX81 PCB Revision 3 bottom side

The development of the ZX81 got under way even before the ZX80 had been launched. Sinclair's chief engineer, Jim Westwood, was given the task of improving the ZX80's hardware to reduce the number of components and thus bring down the cost. He also sought to fix some of the more annoying problems with the ZX80. Westwood and his colleagues found that the component count could be reduced greatly by combining eighteen of the ZX80's chips into a single uncommitted logic array (ULA), a type of general-purpose chip full of logic gates that were connected up as the customer required during chip manufacture. This short-lived technology of the day was cheaper and quicker than the design of a customised logic chip, which typically required very high volumes to recoup its development cost. Ferranti produced the new chip for Sinclair, who hailed Westwood's design as a triumph of innovation: "The ZX81 had four chips when our nearest competitor in this respect, the TRS-80, had 44." Only 70% of the logic gates on the ULA were supposed to be used, but Sinclair decided to use them all to squeeze more functions in. This resulted in the machine becoming uncomfortably warm during usage. Computing folklore held that the ZX81 had to be refrigerated by balancing a carton of cold milk on top of the case.

The ZX81's ROM was doubled to 8 KB, from the ZX80's 4 KB ROM. This enabled a fuller implementation of a version of ANSI Minimal BASIC (termed Sinclair BASIC by the company). Clive Sinclair re-commissioned a company called Nine Tiles, which had produced the ZX80 ROM, to develop the new ROM software for the ZX81. The code was written by John Grant, the owner of Nine Tiles, and Steve Vickers, who had joined the company in January 1980. Grant concentrated on the software that drove the ZX81's hardware, while Vickers developed the new BASIC and the accompanying manual. Sinclair's brief to the pair was fairly non-specific but primarily concerned remedying a key defect of the ZX80 so that the new machine could be used for practical programming and calculations. Vickers later recalled:

As far as Clive was concerned, it wasn't a question of what the machine ought to be able to do, but more what could be crammed into the machine given the component budget he'd set his mind on. The only firm brief for the '81 was that the '80s math package must be improved.

The new ROM incorporated trigonometric and floating-point functions, which its predecessor had lacked – the ZX80 could only deal with whole numbers. Grant came up with one of the ZX81's more novel features, a syntax checker that indicated errors in BASIC code as soon as it was entered (rather than, as was standard at the time, only disclosing coding errors when a program was run). Unfortunately for Vickers, he introduced a briefly notorious error – the so-called "square-root bug" that caused the square root of 0.25 to be returned erroneously as 1.3591409 – as a result of problems with integrating the ZX Printer code into the ROM. Although it was eventually fixed, the bug became the subject of controversy and Sinclair was forced to replace some of the ZX81s sold to early customers. On a more positive note, Vickers' work on the manual was received favourably, being described in 1983 as "one of the classic texts on BASIC". Max Phillips commented in a What Micro? retrospective:

It does a reasonable job and sensibly provides lots for the reader to do. It's quite honest about the [ZX81]'s shortcomings and provides hints and tips for ways round them ... Best of all, the manual is complete and comprehensive. There's some fairly advanced and often undisclosed information in there. The beginner won't understand it for a long time but if he or she learns some more advanced ideas, the manual is ready for them.

The task of designing the ZX81's case again fell to Rick Dickinson, who produced an updated version of the ZX80's wedge-shaped case. This time round, the design team were able to use injection moulding, which enabled them to deliver a higher-quality case. Dickinson originally envisaged the ZX81 as "an expandable range of boxes following a vaguely modular approach with a common width", though this approach was eventually dropped. From start to finish, the design process took about six months.

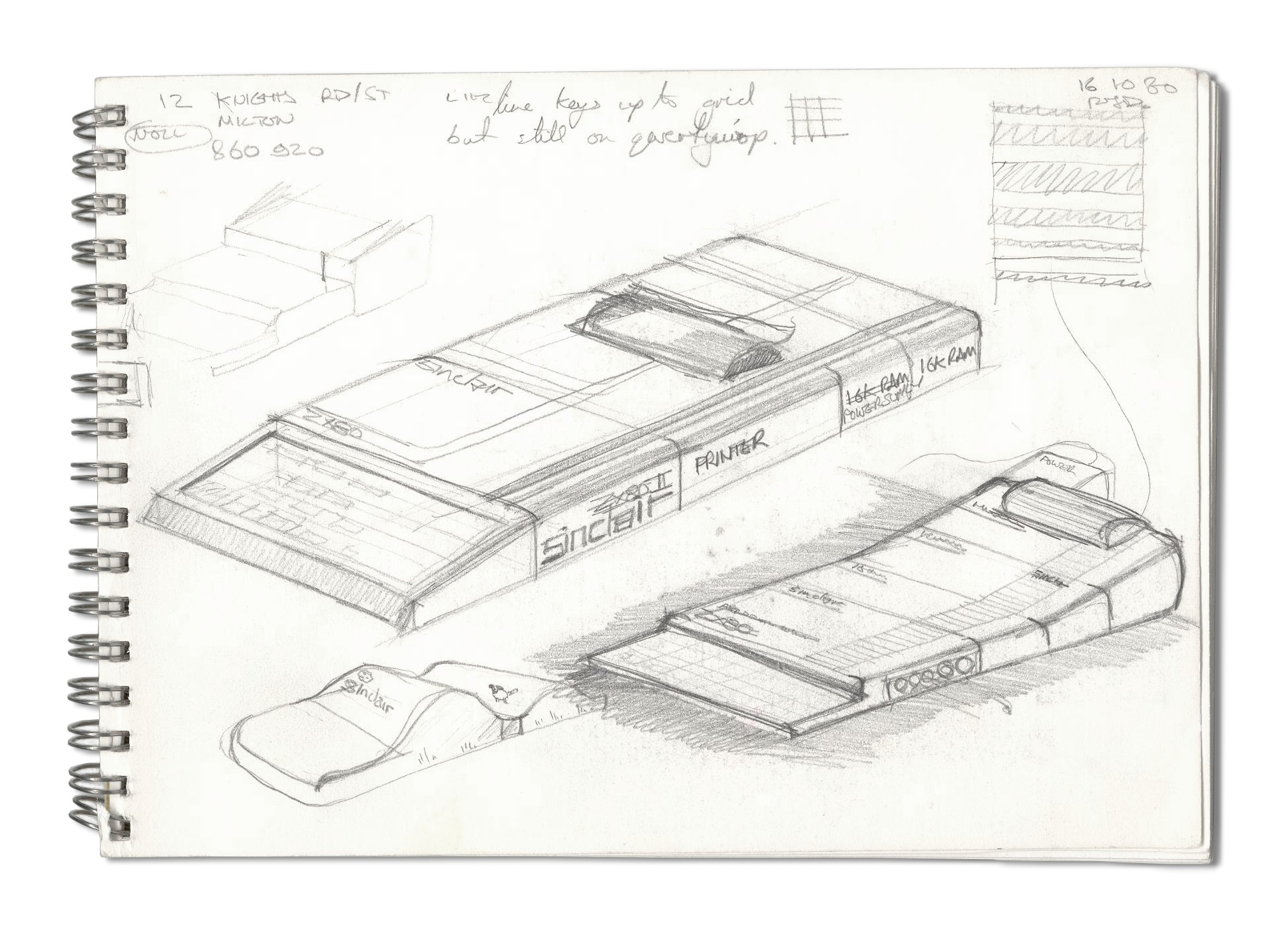
One of Rick Dickinson's original concept drawings for the ZX81, envisaging the machine as part of "an expandable range of boxes following a vaguely modular approach"

The ZX81 was launched on 5 March 1981 in two versions (though with identical components) – a pre-assembled machine or a cheaper kit version, which the user could assemble themself. Both versions were manufactured in Dundee, Scotland by Timex Corporation at the company's Dryburgh factory. Timex had not been an obvious choice of manufacturing subcontractor, as the company had little previous experience in assembling electronics. It was a well-established manufacturer of mechanical watches but was facing a crisis at the beginning of the 1980s. Profits had dwindled to virtually zero as the market for mechanical watches stagnated in the face of competition from the digital and quartz watches. Recognising the trend, Timex's director, Fred Olsen, determined that the company would diversify into other areas of business.

This shift by Timex came at an ideal time for Sinclair. The ZX80 had proved more popular than expected and Sinclair's existing manufacturer, a small electronics company in St Ives, lacked the resources to deal with the demand. Timex took over production of the ZX80 late in 1980. The arrangement worked well for both companies and Timex took on the manufacture of the ZX81, aided by capital investment in its Dundee plant. Sinclair initially planned to produce 10,000 ZX81s a month, rising to 30,000 a month within a year. However, Timex initially had significant problems in producing enough ZX81s to satisfy demand. As a consequence, it took up to nine weeks for ZX81s to be delivered by mail order. It was not until September 1981, five months after the launch of the ZX81, that the delivery times finally came down to the promised twenty-eight days. Those who already owned or had recently ordered the ZX80 were not excluded; anyone who had ordered a ZX80 in the two weeks before the ZX81's launch would receive the newer machine, while existing owners were able to upgrade their ZX80s by plugging an extra £20 ROM chip into the circuit board.

The reliability of the ZX81 was controversial. W.H. Smith, one of the machine's key distributors, had a company policy of ordering a third more ZX81s than were actually required for sale, so that it would have enough replacements for faulty machines. Similar problems were reported in the US market, where contemporary reports suggested that only a third of the ZX81s shipped actually worked. However, figures released by Sinclair claimed that only 2.4 per cent of pre-assembled machines were returned, although 13 per cent of kits were returned. Clive Sinclair strongly denied any problem with reliability:

We have a lower rate of failure on our computers than anybody else in the world, and the reason for that is that we do everything to keep the quality right. The ZX81 production line is a miracle of efficiency; after all, one is made every 10 seconds. They go through the most amazing quality control. Also we have a far lower component count than anyone else. We have only four chips where everyone else has 40.

Sinclair attributed the higher failure rate of the kits to customers breaking the components by inserting or soldering them the wrong way, though the company admitted that there was a persistent problem with power supplies that affected both kits and pre-assembled ZX81s. The bigger problem was perhaps Sinclair's lack of after-sales service, which Robin Clarke of New Scientist described as "one of the worst after-sales performance records of any company ever established". The Financial Times observed that "Clive Sinclair's offices are filled with returned computers which can take months to be repaired." The company's slowness in replacing returns and delivering freshly ordered machines meant that Sinclair Research gained a reputation for poor customer service.

=== Marketing ===
The marketing of the ZX81 was handled by Sinclair's long-standing marketing agency Primary Contact (now part of Ogilvy & Mather), which had provided marketing services for Sinclair since 1971 and was to continue doing so until 1985. Sinclair's entry into the nascent home computing market gave Primary Contact a major challenge – how to market a product simultaneously at hobbyists and at the "man on the street", who probably had little or no computer literacy. The answer was to pursue what the journalist David O'Reilly of MicroScope magazine described as a single-minded "user-friendly strategy". Chris Fawkes, one of Primary Contact's directors, explained: "We brought personal computers to the mass market by showing that you didn't have to be a whizzkid to use one." As Clive Sinclair put it in a 1982 interview with Your Computer,

There are two big markets. There is the hobbyist and the man in the street. The hobbyist was a dead certainty. We knew we could sell to him because we have so much experience of it and we were offering a better product. The much less certain prospect was the man in the street. There the view was that if we offered him a computer plus a self-training book at a keen enough price he would buy by mail order – which, of course, he has.

According to Ben Rosen, by pricing the ZX81 so low, "Sinclair has opened up a completely new market among people who had never previously considered owning a computer." Clive Sinclair acknowledged the role that guesswork had played in his decision to launch the ZX81 on such a large scale: "It was a surmise that the man in the street would want such a computer. He does, and our information is that a lot of people are using the machines avidly." A New Scientist retrospective published in 1986 commented:

Sir Clive's marketing achievement was to downgrade the "concept" of a computer to the point where he could claim to provide one for less than the magical £100 mark. To this end, efficient keyboards and monitors, useful amounts of memory, efficient filing and storage systems and the like were stripped away, to leave an affordable facsimile of a "computer". The market image was more important than what the computer could do, but the burgeoning industry in computer games provided an application which adolescents – young and old – eagerly seized on as the raison d'être for their new gadget. In the main, it was ignorance of genuine computer technology that fired the success of the ZX range, despite the availability of accessories that, albeit inefficiently, turned the Z80 processor chip at the heart of these up-market toys into the core of a useful machine.

Sinclair Research's launch advertising for the ZX81. High-profile advertisements such as this were used to promote the benefits and value for money of the ZX81.

High-profile advertising was central to the marketing campaign. Although Sinclair Research was a relatively small company, it had a long-standing policy of using large-scale advertisements that stood out in stark contrast to the more muted advertisements of other manufacturers. Superlatives, exhortations, appeals to patriotism, testimonials, eye-catching drawings and photographs on double-page spreads, varying from month to month, were used to drum up mail order business for Sinclair. The launch advertising for the ZX81 illustrates this approach. A photograph of the ZX81 alongside the official Sinclair peripherals dominated the centre of a double-page spread. The value for money of Sinclair's products was emphasised by the prices being printed in larger type than any other text on the spread. The ZX81's benefits were promoted with the aspirational slogan "Sinclair ZX81 Personal Computer – the heart of a system that grows with you". The advertisement highlighted ZX81 BASIC Programming, the manual written by Steve Vickers, as "a complete course in BASIC programming, from first principles to complex programs". The educational benefits of the ZX81 were stressed ("it's still very simple to teach yourself computing") and its technical advantages were explained in relatively non-technical terms. For instance, the ZX81's idiosyncratic method of typing commands with a single keystroke – the result of the memory-saving method of using one-byte tokens to represent keywords – was presented as "eliminat[ing] a great deal of tiresome typing". The ZX81's British character was emphasised; it was "designed by Sinclair and custom-built in Britain". Sinclair's advertising in the United States provides an illustration of how the company perceived the ZX81's purpose:

For less than $100, the Sinclair ZX81 will get you started in personal computing right now. Your children will gain an understanding of computers that will benefit them for the rest of their lives. And you will be prepared to make informed decisions about using and buying computers, both in your career and in your home.

This approach to advertising was driven by Sinclair's reliance on mail-order marketing. It came with a high up-front cost in terms of purchasing space in publications but it had the advantage of ensuring that all sales were firm and pre-paid. A big splash on launch produced a large influx of cash at the outset of a campaign, though it did also depend on the advertiser having enough product to satisfy the initial surge in demand. The advertisements served an additional purpose of priming the market for over-the-counter sales by "getting the story across", as Clive Sinclair put it: "Not that big a proportion do buy on mail order, but they see the ads, and that helps to prepare them for buying when the item appears in the shops."

Sinclair himself became a focal point for the marketing campaign, putting a human face on the business, while Sinclair Research was portrayed in the media as a plucky British challenger taking on the technical and marketing might of giant American and Japanese corporations. As David O'Reilly noted, "by astute use of public relations, particularly playing up his image of a Briton taking on the world, Sinclair has become the best-known name in micros." The popular press soon latched onto the image. His "Uncle Clive" persona is said to have been created by the gossip columnist for Personal Computer World, while the media praised Sinclair as a visionary genius (or even, in the words of The Sun, "the most prodigious inventor since Leonardo"). As Ian Adamson and Richard Kennedy put it, Sinclair outgrew "the role of microcomputer manufacturer and accepted the mantle of pioneering boffin leading Britain into a technological utopia".

Pricing was central to the marketing strategy, as it had been through Sinclair's career. The ZX81 had been designed to meet a £70 price point and was launched at a price of £69.95 (built) or £49.95 (kit). One Sinclair brochure presented a side-by-side comparison of the ZX81 with the four machines that Sinclair considered its main rivals – the Acorn Atom, Apple II Plus, Commodore PET and TRS-80. The comparison highlighted the vast differences in cost, from £630 in the case of the Apple II Plus to just £70 for the ZX81, though even by Sinclair's own comparison the Apple was by far the more capable machine.

According to Sinclair himself, the £69.95 price was chosen after applying the "experience curve" developed by the Boston Consulting Group. Sinclair's prior experience in the calculator market had highlighted the fact that a product will be more profitable selling at (for instance) twice the manufactured cost than at three times. He could have launched the ZX81 at a higher price, marketing it in a more traditional way as a premium product, but chose not to. In effect, he used the lower price to establish an unassailable lead before the competition moved in.

An essential part of Sinclair's marketing strategy was to use regular cost-cutting at strategic intervals to maintain market share. Ian Adamson and Richard Kennedy comment that Sinclair's approach was "to secure and extend [his] market lead and panic the competition. While most companies reduce prices when their products are in steep decline, Sinclair tends to discount shortly after sales have peaked. The advantage of his approach is that vacillating customers are drawn into the fold while the product's promotion retains a commercial urgency, and the costings of the competition are thrown into utter disarray."

This tactic proved highly successful, with Sinclair announcing by March 1982 that it had sold 250,000 ZX81s worldwide. 50,000 computers were sold each month, 60% outside the UK, despite Sinclair and W. H. Smith being the only distributors. Despite the launch of its successor, the ZX Spectrum, Sinclair reportedly intended to increase ZX81 production to 150,000 a month. When sales fell after the Spectrum's debut, Sinclair reduced the price of the pre-assembled version to £49.95 in May 1982. It was cut by another £10 the following April. Despite the increased competition from much more capable computers, the ZX81 was still shipping in excess of 30,000 units a month even as late as July 1983, more than two years after it had been launched. By that time, according to Sinclair Research, over 1.5 million ZX81s had been sold.

=== Distribution ===
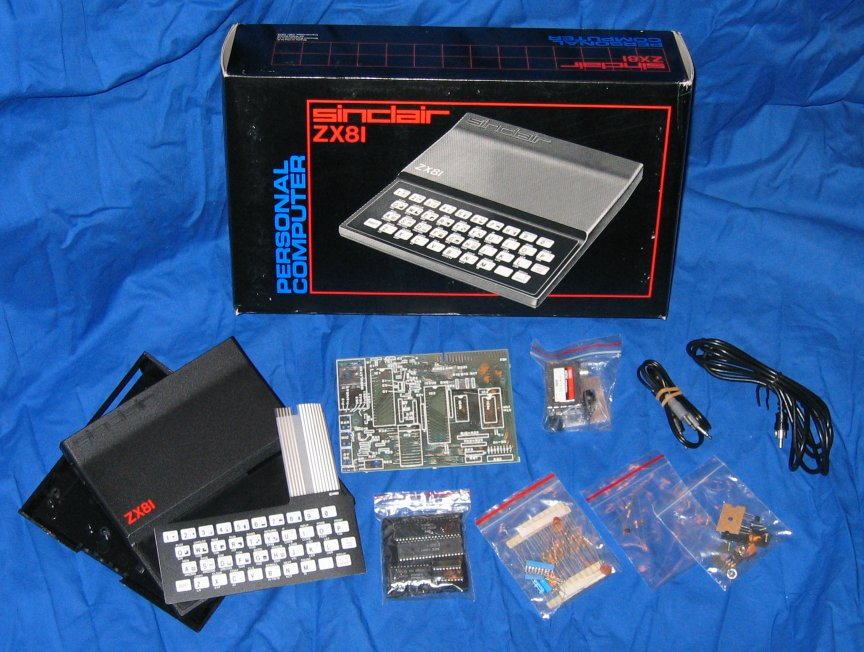
The kit version of the ZX81, sold by Sinclair through mail-order

The ZX81 significantly altered computer distribution in the United Kingdom by moving sales from mail-order channels to mainstream retail. Sinclair had previously made its name as a mail-order retailer, as the ZX81 was initially available only through mail-order.

Smith's had begun selling audio and photographic equipment and calculators at the end of the 1970s, with a modest degree of success. In 1980 its marketing development manager, John Rowland, hit upon the idea of creating "Computer Know-How" sections in major branches to sell computer books and magazines. Most of the items on display were imports from the United States but their relatively high cost reduced their attractiveness to the casual buyer. The commercial success and mass market potential of the ZX80 caught Rowland's interest; he approached Sinclair, saw a prototype ZX81 and agreed to market the machine through Smith's on an exclusive basis for the first six months after launch. As Rowland put it, "what we've done now is bring the computer-orientated publications together with an actual computer, to create the Computer Know-How section of the store", alongside computer software and blank cassette tapes. The ZX81 would be sold in 112 stores around the UK and would serve as the centrepiece of the "Computer Know-How" sections.

Selling the ZX81 over the counter was seen as something of a gamble and Rowland's colleagues were initially unenthusiastic about the scheme. Branch buyers thought that the ZX81 was unlikely to sell more than 10–15 units per branch at launch. Rowland himself thought that the ZX81 would sell about 10,000 units during the first five months of the retail agreement, equivalent to one month's mail order sales by Sinclair. In the event, the ZX81 was a massive success for Smith's, it went on sale for £99 making it the first home PC in the UK to retail for under £100. The "Computer Know-How" sections were swamped with eager customers, overwhelming the 300 staff who had been trained to demonstrate the machines; a Financial Times correspondent wrote of being "dazed and bewildered by the crowds of schoolchildren clustered round the ZX81 in your local branch of W. H. Smith". Within a year, Smith's had sold 350,000 ZX81s, making an estimated net profit of £10 million. Sales of peripherals, software, books and magazines netted even more profit.

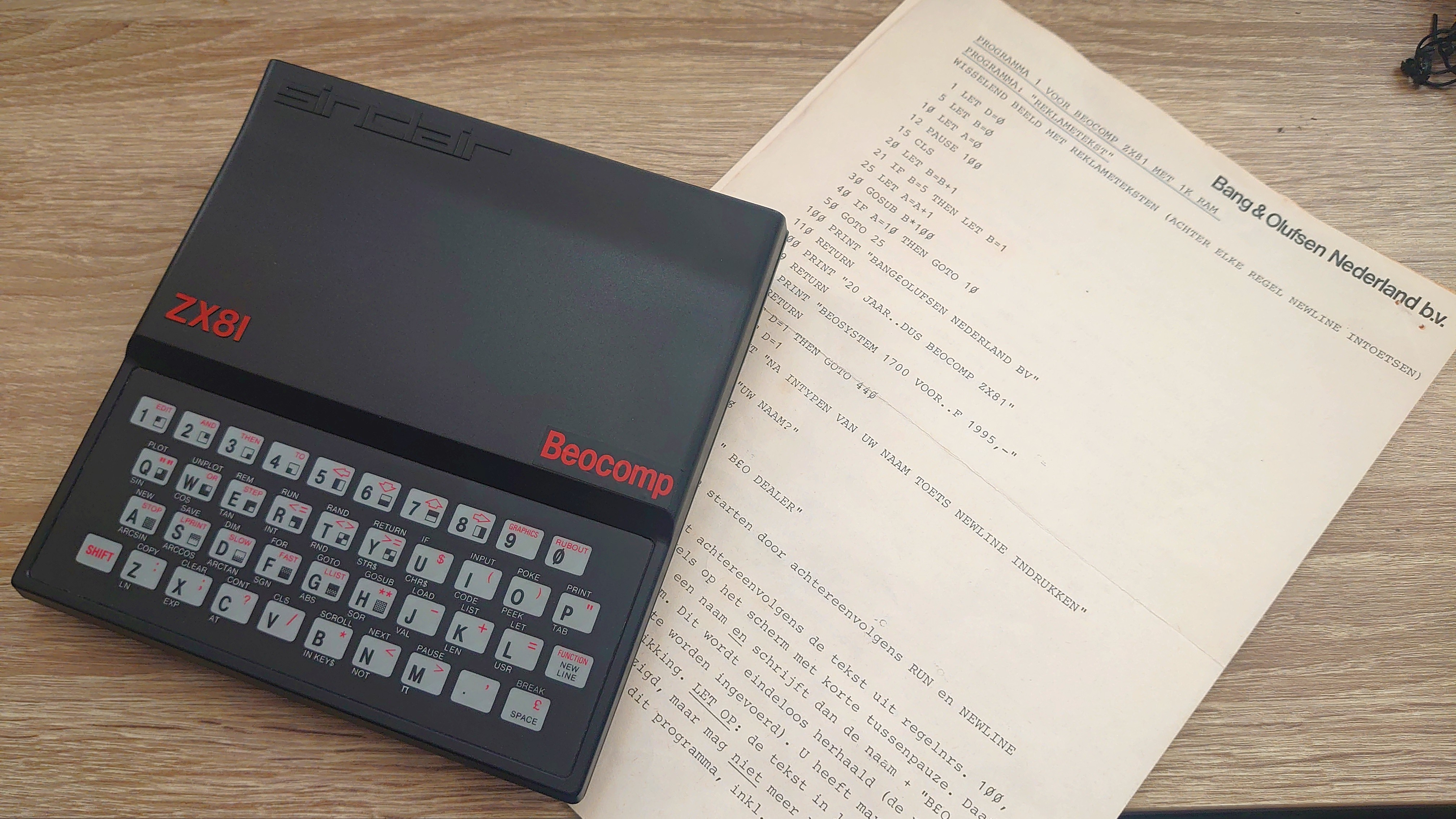
Beocomp ZX81

The British chain stores Boots, John Menzies and Currys began selling the ZX81 as soon as Smith's exclusive distribution deal expired and a number of companies secured overseas distribution rights for the ZX81, which was being sold in 18 countries by March 1982. Sinclair launched the ZX81 in the United States in November 1981 at a price of $149.95 assembled (equivalent to $530 in 2025) and $99.95 in kit form (equivalent to $350 in 2025), initially selling directly to the American market by mail order. To be useful the computer needed an extra 16 KB RAM pack which cost $49.95 (equivalent to $180 in 2025). Sales reached 15,000 a month by January 1982, while American Express sold thousands more to its own customers. In February 1982 Timex obtained a licence from Sinclair to sell the ZX81 directly through thousands of US retail outlets, paying Sinclair Research a 5 percent royalty on all Sinclair hardware and software sold by Timex. The company was later to produce its own licensed clones and variants of the ZX81. By August 1982 Sinclair had lowered the American mail-order price of the assembled ZX81 to $99.95 and kit to $79.95, and its advertisements stated that "more than 10,000 are sold every week". In December 1981 Mitsui obtained rights to distribute the ZX81 in Japan, selling it by mail order for ¥38,700 (equivalent to £83 in 1982 prices), and had sold 5,000 units by July 1982. The Japanese market's favourable reaction to the ZX81 led Mitsui to begin selling the ZX81 over the counter in large bookshops from September 1982, with annual sales of 20,000 units predicted. In the Netherlands, the regular Sinclair ZX81 was for sale as well as a Bang & Olufsen branded version called Beocomp.

The ZX81 was also sold for a while in duty-free shops at UK airports. However, this fell foul of government export restrictions aimed at preventing the Soviet bloc countries from obtaining Western high technology goods. It was not uncommon for visitors from the Soviet Union and other eastern European countries to pick up gadgets in Western countries with the aim of transferring their technology to their own states' industries. In 1983 the government ordered that the ZX81s were to be withdrawn from sale at airports. There was no such restriction on sales to communist China and in November 1983 Sinclair Research announced that it had signed an agreement to export ZX81 kits to a factory in Guangzhou, where they would be assembled for the Chinese market.

== Reception ==
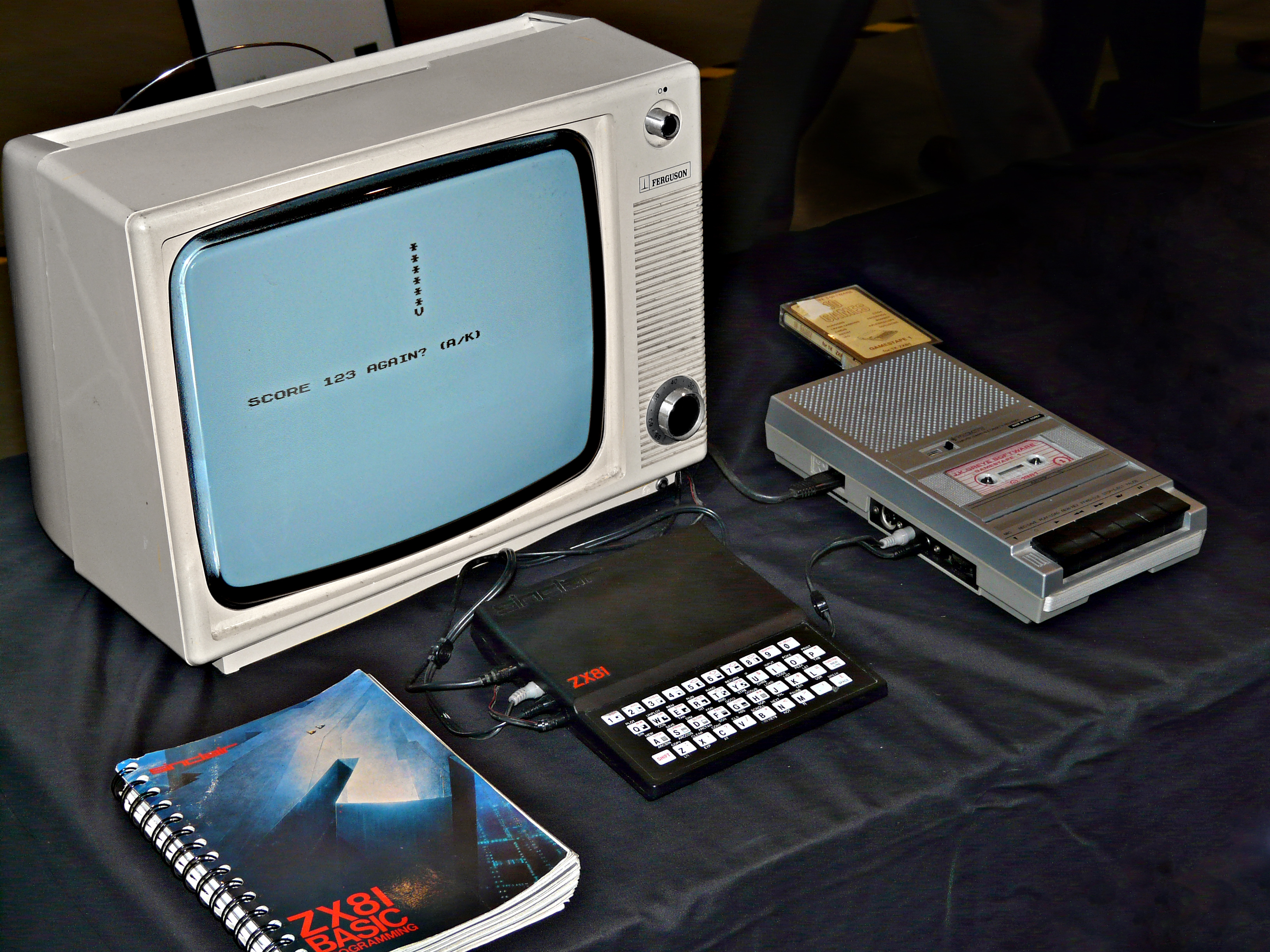
A typical ZX81 setup including cassette recorder and black-and-white Ferguson television set

Reviews of the ZX81 highlighted the great value for money offered by the machine but noted its technical shortcomings. As Tim Hartnell put it in Your Computer, "the ZX81 is both a delight and a disappointment". He applauded the improvements that had been made over the ZX80, such as a much better manual, display and string handling, and called the ZX81 "a very good first computer" that "will open the world of computing to many who would be denied access to it by cost". However, the built-in memory was so small that use of a memory expansion pack was "mandatory for any worthwhile use". He also found the ZX81 to be alarmingly unreliable, having to have his first two test machines replaced before getting one that worked properly.

New Scientist's Malcolm Peltu commented that it was "great technical value for money particularly for computing enthusiasts" but thought that others were "likely to be bored very quickly by the basic system". He highlighted weaknesses in the manual and Sinclair's accompanying software, criticising them for "a misconceived design and sloppiness in execution which make the machine seem harder to use and more limited than it should" and questioned whether it might be more worthwhile to save up for a more powerful computer such as Acorn or Commodore's offerings. Overall, he concluded, the ZX81 might have a limited value in helping to teach BASIC programming and overcoming psychological barriers to computing, but "the Sinclair systems have a long way to go before they raise the quality and level of understanding of the nature and use of computer-based information systems among computer unbelievers."

While the editor of Personal Computer World was on holiday in May 1981, his colleagues publicised the magazine's review of the ZX81 with a cover showing a chimpanzee with the machine above the strapline "Editor benchtests the ZX81". (The chimp returned in later issues to "benchtest" all of Sinclair's subsequent computers.) The review, which was written by PCW staffer Dave Tebbutt, acknowledged that the machine had significant shortcomings but nonetheless represented "absolutely amazing value for money". He described the ZX81 as "a lovely product which will have enormous appeal to people wanting to find out more about computers, but without it costing them an arm and a leg" and concluded: "If you know nothing about computers and you want to enjoy finding out about them, then this machine offers a value for money way of doing just that. Children will love the ZX81, there can be no question about that, and I suspect that more than a few people who are already familiar with computers will buy one, just to have a bit of fun."

Paul Taylor of the Financial Times found the ZX81 to be "a powerful and flexible little computer ideally suited as a fun introduction to the mysteries of home computing" but cautioned readers about its limitations. It lacked ready-made software, the keyboard was not easy to use, it did not have sufficiently advanced graphics to be able to replicate arcade-style games and its built-in memory was inadequate. Even so, he suggested, "the ZX81 is a unique British product, part toy, part puzzle, part learning tool and I think that, provided one accepts its limitations and recognises that any computer will only do what it is told to do, it is good value as an introduction to the hobby of home computing."

The Age described the ZX81 as "not extremely sophisticated, and its memory capability is rather limited. It also has a rather toy-like appearance". It concluded that the computer was "an ideal toy for youngsters who want to become acquainted with the computer world. It is responsive, cheap, and very easy to use".

Billy Garrett of Byte, who already owned a ZX80, complimented the Timex/Sinclair 1000's manual (although he regretted the removal of the British original's humour), the "state-of-the-art circuitry", and the BASIC for being "remarkably powerful" despite the small ROM size. He concluded that "the major use ... will probably be for learning about BASIC or computers in general. [It] has limited expansion capabilities, and the keyboard is too small and cramped for any serious work".

Phillip Robinson of InfoWorld had no trouble using a $25 "department-store special" cassette recorder with his Timex/Sinclair 1000, but reported that friends could not use theirs. While also experiencing and having to compensate for the memory-expansion wobble, he stated his amazement at being able to purchase a complete computer with keyboard and BASIC "at digital-watch prices", approved of the documentation's quality, and surmised that Timex "is obviously gunning for the computer-literacy market ... at a price the masses can afford and are willing to spend". Robinson described the 1000's performance as "no slouch", especially its floating-point precision, and suggested using it as a single-purpose device devoted to one task while using another, larger computer.

David Babsky described the ZX81 as "a wonderfully brainy little micro which won't let you waste your time and make a fool of yourself". In a comparison between the ZX81 and IBM PC published in Which Micro?, he commended the ZX81's user-friendliness and its on-the-fly syntax checking of BASIC programs, which he described as "the feature that I, as a newcomer to computing, want to see incorporated into every micro."

== Peripherals and software ==
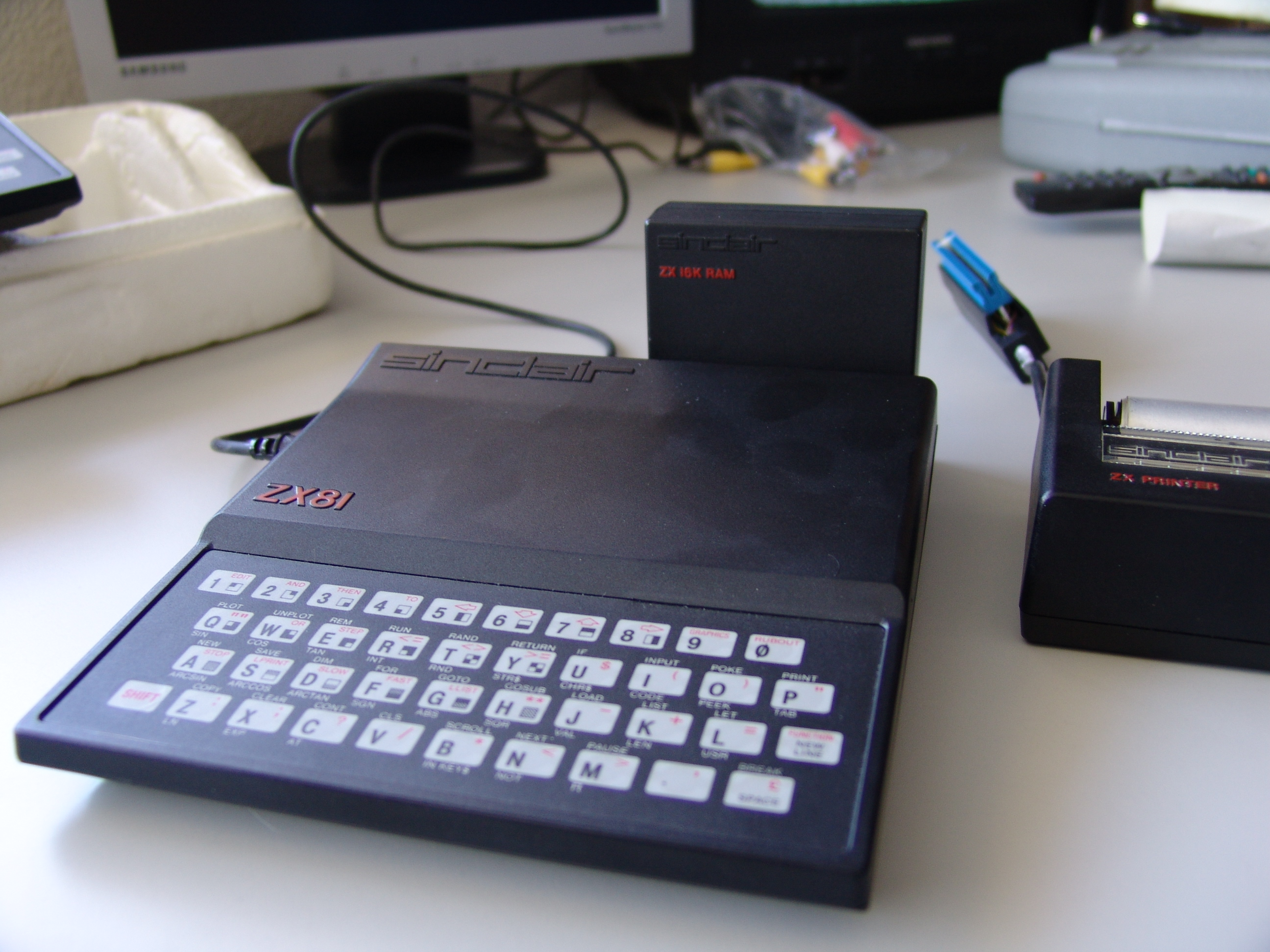
A ZX81 connected to Sinclair's official peripherals – the notoriously wobbly 16 KB RAM pack and the ZX Printer

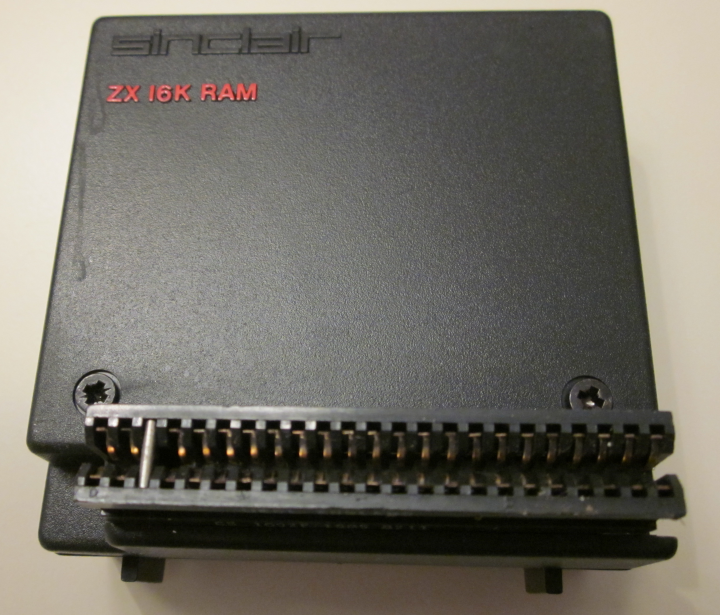
Closeup view of the 16K RAM module, showing its edge connector

The success of the ZX81 led almost immediately to enthusiasts producing a huge variety of peripherals and software. Clive Sinclair was "amused and gratified" by the attention the machine received but other than what Clarke described as "a few remarkably poor programs on cassette", his company made little effort to exploit the demand, effectively ceding a very lucrative market to third party suppliers, a decision that undoubtedly forfeited a lot of potential earnings. W. H. Smith, for instance, was able to exploit a peculiarity of the ZX81; owners found that technically obsolete low-fidelity mono tape cassette recorders worked better as storage devices than higher-quality music systems. Smith's purchased cheap "shoebox" cassette recorders in the Far East and sold them with the W. H. Smith logo as "data recorders". Over 100,000 were sold in 18 months.

Sinclair released only two official peripherals for the ZX81, a 16 KB RAM pack (actually the same one previously released for the ZX80, but rebadged) and the ZX Printer, both of which plug into the edge connector at the rear of the ZX81. They retailed at a launch price of £49.95 each but both have notable flaws. The RAM pack is top-heavy and supported only by the edge connector. It falls out of its socket at crucial points and crashes the ZX81, losing anything that the user has typed in. Users turned to using sticky lumps of chewing gum, double-sided tape, or Blu-Tack to cure what became known as the "RAM pack wobble" problem. The ZX Printer is a tiny spark printer that uses two electrically charged styli to burn away the surface of aluminium-coated paper to reveal the black underlay. It works reasonably well at first but its output deteriorates rapidly after a time.

Many non-Sinclair peripherals aimed to remedy the ZX81's flaws and provide many new capabilities. These included RAM packs providing up to 64 KB of extra memory and promising to "fit snugly ... giving a firm connection" to the computer, typewriter-style keyboards, more advanced printers and sound generators. A wide range of software was also published. Within only a year of the ZX81's launch, around 200 independent companies had been established to manufacture and sell Sinclair-compatible hardware. The people behind the ZX81 cottage industry were very often not computer professionals but were, as the Financial Times noted, "school teachers, civil servants, electrical engineers and technicians [who] have set up small operations in their own time".

The ZX81's popularity was publicly demonstrated in January 1982 when civil servant Mike Johnstone organised a "ZX Microfair" at Westminster Central Hall. Seventy exhibitors set up stalls with only a few hundred visitors expected in a hall with a capacity of 650 people. Tens of thousands, mostly youths, came from around Britain, and the police had to control the crowd. They queued for three hours around the hall, with a group of 50 entering as another group left. About 12,000 entered the hall; Clarke, who was only able to enter after identifying himself as a journalist, wrote that "no one knows how many gave up in despair". The exhibitors sold thousands of pounds' worth of software and hardware "as fast as three pairs of hands on each stall could hand them over and stuff the fivers into improvised overflowing cash boxes", he added. The fair also showed Sinclair Research's relatively unimportant role in the computer's success, with only small crowds at its booth compared to the "rugby scrum" elsewhere. By August 1983 seven more ZX Microfairs were held, with the 14th ZX Microfair at Alexandra Palace in November 1984, still organised by Johnstone.

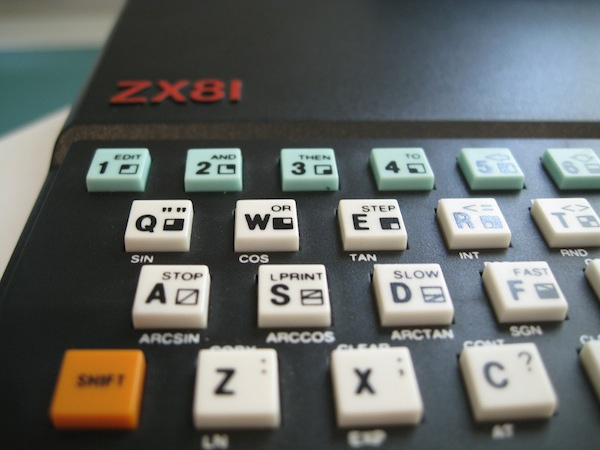
Many ZX81 owners replaced the machine's touch-sensitive keyboard with more usable add-on keyboards produced by third-party suppliers.

Thousands of ZX81 programs were published, either as type-in programs or as ready-made applications that could be loaded from cassette tape. Many computer magazines featured ZX81 program listings – some, such as Sinclair Programs, were dedicated entirely to listings – while many individuals became the archetypal "bedroom programmers", producing games and applications which they produced, marketed, recorded, and sold from their own homes. Some went on to found their own software houses, employing teams of programmers – some still at school – to produce programs for the ZX81 and other computers. Existing companies also sold software; Psion produced a series of ZX81 programs in close association with Sinclair, including a flight simulator, while ICL's range of ZX81 programs sold over 100,000 cassettes in less than three months. Psion's success with the ZX81 had a profound effect on the future of the company. Its work on the ZX81 database program Vu-File led to Psion switching its focus to the development of personal digital assistants, which resulted in the launch in 1984 of the Psion Organiser, the world's first handheld personal computer. Some of the most popular ZX81 games (Psion's Flight Simulation being an example) were rewritten for the Spectrum to take advantage of the newer machine's colour and sound capabilities.

One of the more bizarre software products for the ZX81 came about as a result of music companies attempting to capitalise on the popularity of Sinclair's computers. In 1983, EMI released a single by Chris Sievey that had a ZX81 program recorded on the B-side. Island Records responded with XL1 by Buzzcocks frontman Pete Shelley, packaged with a program for the ZX Spectrum.

=== Games ===
Enterprising programmers were able to produce games for the ZX81 using nothing more than text characters and the machine's limited text semigraphics. Some ZX81 games achieved lasting fame, such as 3D Monster Maze, a tense first-person perspective game that involved the player escaping a labyrinth with a Tyrannosaurus rex in pursuit. Written in a combination of BASIC and machine code, its innovative design led it to be hailed as the first home computer 3D game and a landmark in the history of computer and video games.

== Clones and variants ==
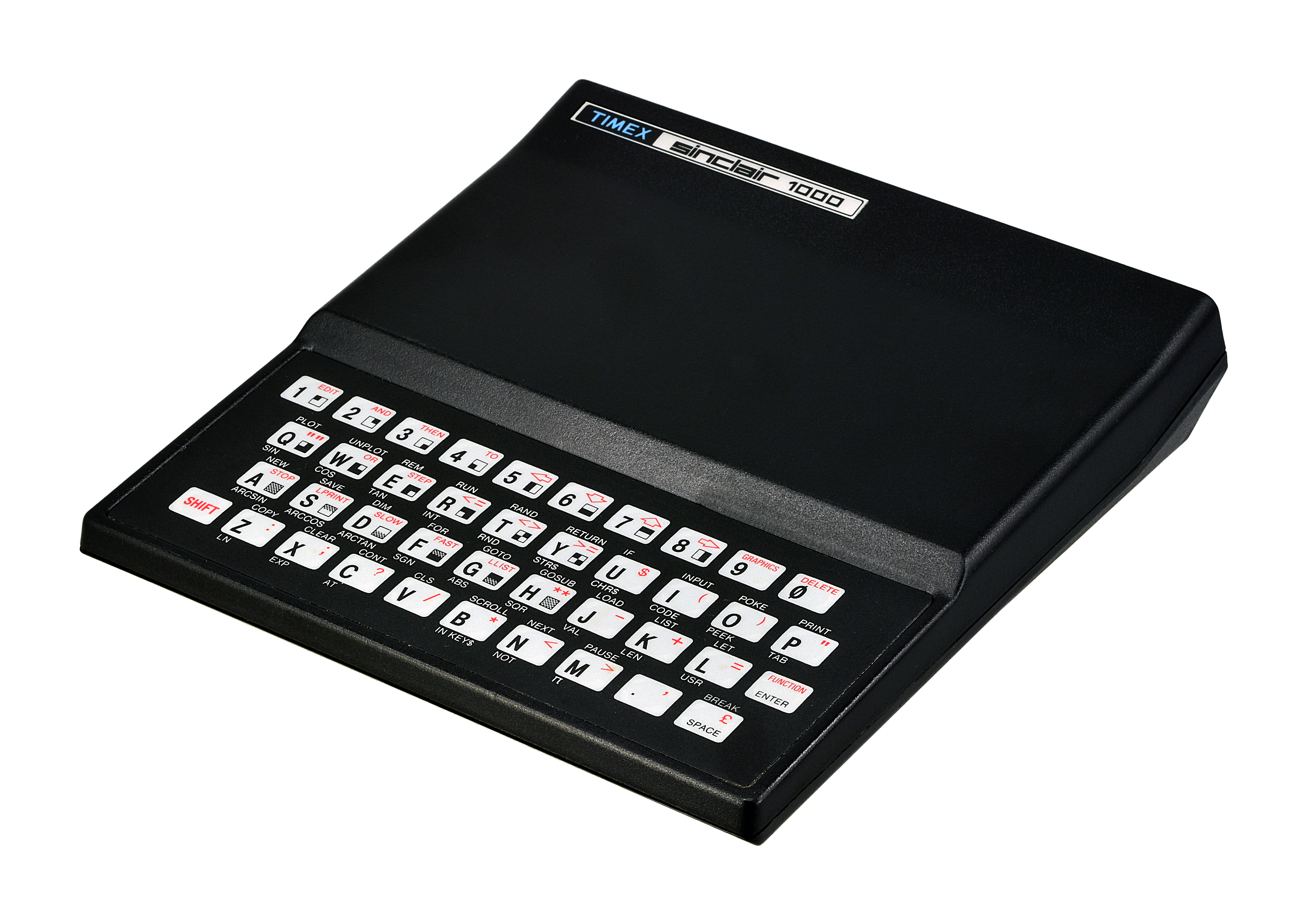
The Timex Sinclair 1000, a licensed ZX81 variant produced for the US market by Timex in 1982–83. It was initially highly successful but sales soon collapsed.

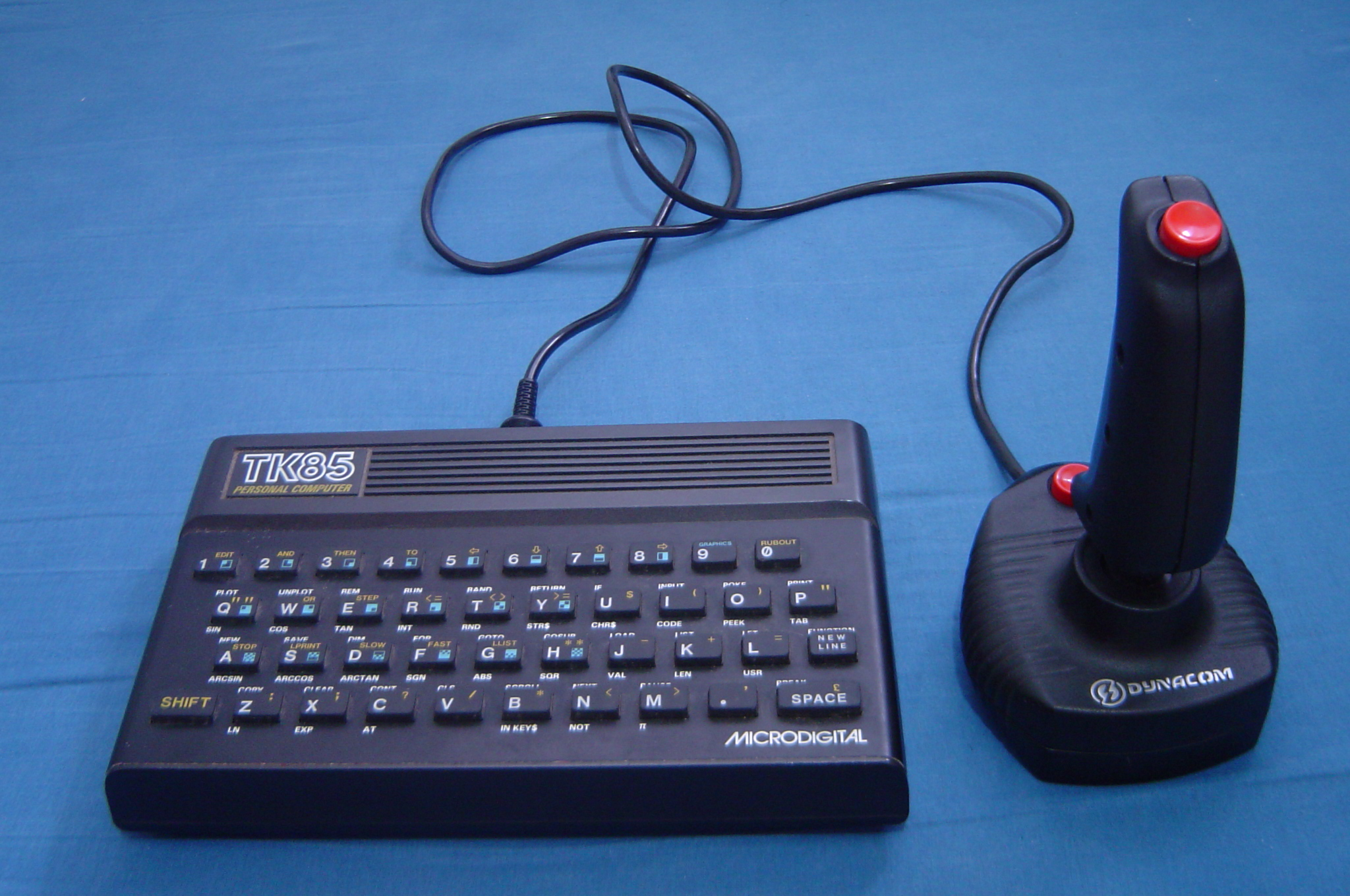
The TK85, an unauthorised ZX81 clone produced by Microdigital Eletronica of Brazil

Sinclair's licensing agreement with Timex enabled the American company to produce three clones or offshoots of Sinclair machines for the US market. These were the Timex Sinclair 1000, Timex Sinclair 1500 (both variants of the ZX81) and the Timex Sinclair 2068 (a variant of the ZX Spectrum). The TS1000 was launched in July 1982 and sparked a massive surge of interest; at one point, the Timex phoneline was receiving over 5,000 calls an hour, 50,000 a week, inquiring about the machine or about microcomputers in general. It was virtually identical to the ZX81 save for re-branding and the addition of an extra 1 KB of memory, totalling 2 KB. In the five months following the TS1000's launch, the company sold 550,000 machines, earning Sinclair over $1.2 million in royalties.

Timex produced a second version of the ZX81 in the form of the TS1500, essentially an Americanised ZX81 launched in August 1983. It dispensed with the membrane keyboard and used a case similar to that of the ZX Spectrum, incorporating 16 KB of on-board memory. It was effectively a stopgap between the ZX81 and Spectrum. However, it was unsuccessful due to increased competition from rival US machines and the after-effects of Timex's botched marketing of the TS1000. Although the TS1000 had initially been a great success, Timex failed to provide the essential RAM pack upgrades to the market for two or three months after it launched the TS1000. Consumers would take the machine home, plug it in and find that it would not do anything useful due to the lack of memory.

In addition, consumers' attitude in the US was quite different from that in the UK. Clive Sinclair told Informatics magazine in June 1981 that "our competitors thought that consumers didn't want to learn programming. We [Sinclair Research] think they failed because of this and because of price." Timex evidently shared this belief but events proved it to be a false assumption. The TS1000/ZX81's price advantage was erased when its main rivals – the TI-99/4A and the VIC-20 – had their prices cut to below the all-important $100 mark. Competitors such as Apple, Atari, Commodore and Texas Instruments promoted their machines as being for business or entertainment rather than education, highlighting the value of computers with ready-made applications and more advanced features such as graphics, colour and sound.

By late 1983 Wayne Green reported a "rising chorus of frustrated Timex users who are telling friends not to waste their money". "Hard core" early adopters, he wrote, "became discouraged with the quality of the product, with the poverty of software available and with the almost total lack of information on how to cope with it". Consumers deserted the TS1000 once its novelty value had worn off and, as publishers of programming guides found to their cost, the American public showed little interest in using the machine to learn about computer programming. American retailers were left with large stocks of unsold machines. Burned by this experience, many were unwilling to stock the later Timex Sinclair machines in large numbers and the big chain stores dropped the Timex Sinclair line altogether.

Some companies outside the US and UK produced their own "pirate" versions of the ZX81 and Timex Sinclair computers, aided by weak intellectual property laws in their countries of origin. Several Brazilian companies produced ZX81 clones, notably the TK series (such as the TK85) from Microdigital Eletronica of Brazil) and Prológica's CP-200. Czerweny Electrónica of Argentina produced the CZ1000 and CZ1500, clones of the ZX81 and TS1500 respectively. Lambda Electronics of Hong Kong produced the Lambda 8300, based on the ZX81, which was itself widely copied by other Chinese manufacturers.

The machines were not all straight copies of the ZX81; some, such as the CP-200, came with extra memory and a larger case (often with a chiclet keyboard in place of the original membrane keyboard). One clone, the TL801 from TELLAB of Italy, could emulate either the ZX80 or ZX81 and switch between the two machines via a jumper.

== Impact and legacy ==
The ZX81 had an immediate impact on the fortunes of Sinclair Research and Clive Sinclair himself. The company's profitability rose enormously, from a pretax profit of £818,000 on a turnover of £4.6 million in 1980–81 to £8.55 million on a turnover of £27.17 million in 1981–82. Clive Sinclair became one of the UK's highest-profile businessmen and a millionaire, receiving a £1 million bonus on top of a salary of £13,000. He received a knighthood in the Queen's Birthday Honours and the Young Businessman of the Year award in 1983.

The machine also had a widespread and lasting social impact in the United Kingdom, according to Clive Sinclair, purchasers of the ZX81 came from "a reasonably broad spectrum" that ranged from readers of the upmarket Observer and Sunday Times newspapers to the more downmarket but numerous Sun readers. The largest age group was around 30 years old. The Financial Times reported in March 1982 that most Sinclair computers were being bought for educational purposes, both for adults and children, though the children were usually able to learn much more quickly. Ian Adamson and Richard Kennedy note that the popularity of the ZX81 was "subtly different from the run-of-the-mill social fad"; although most enthusiasts were in their teens or early twenties, many were older users – often parents who had become fascinated by the ZX81s that they had bought for their children. However, the ZX81 boom was overwhelmingly male-dominated.

One of the ZX81's key legacies was that it spurred large numbers of people to try programming for the first time. The ZX81 plays a significant part in the plot of William Gibson's 2003 novel Pattern Recognition. One character, an artist using old ZX81s as a sculptural medium, explains the cultural and intellectual impact that the machine had on British society:

Walking on, he explains to her that Sinclair, the British inventor, had a way of getting things right, but also exactly wrong. Foreseeing the market for affordable personal computers, Sinclair decided that what people would want to do with them was to learn programming. The ZX81, marketed in the United States as the Timex 1000, cost less than the equivalent of a hundred dollars, but required the user to key in programs, tapping away on that little model keyboard-sticker. This had resulted both in the short market-life of the product and, in Voytek's opinion, twenty years on, in the relative preponderance of skilled programmers in the United Kingdom. They had their heads turned by these little boxes, he believes, and by the need to program them...

..."But if Timex sold it in the United States," she asks him, "why didn't we get the programmers?"

"You have programmers, but America is different. America wanted Nintendo. Nintendo gives you no programmers. Also, on launch of product in America, RAM-expansion unit did not ship for three months. People buy computer, take it home, discover it does almost nothing. A disaster."

Among those whose first experience of home computing was provided by the ZX81 are Terry Pratchett (who used it for "very primitive word processing"), Edward de Bono and – perhaps proving William Gibson's point – many video game developers including Charles Cecil, Raffaele Cecco, Pete Cooke, David Perry (whose first published game, a driving game, involved "a black blob avoiding other black blobs"), Rhianna Pratchett, and Jon Ritman.

Even 30 years after launch, the ZX81 has a German user forum, and one in English.

New hardware and software continue to be developed for the ZX81, including a ZX81-based webserver; the ZXpand, a combined SD card interface, 32K configurable memory expansion, and optional joystick port and AY sound interface; and new games on cassette tape by Cronosoft, such as Tut-Tut, Virus, One Little Ghost, and many more, as well as releases by Revival Studios, such as Avalanche, Mayhem, Down, Stairrunner and more.

== See also ==
- ZX81 character set

== Bibliography ==
=== Books ===
- Adamson, Ian; Kennedy, Richard (1986). Sinclair and the Sunrise Technology. Harmondsworth, England: Penguin Books. ISBN 978-0-14-008774-1.
- Bridgewater, Susan; Doyle, Peter (1998). Innovation in marketing. Oxford, England: Butterworth-Heinemann. ISBN 978-0-7506-4121-0 – via Internet Archive.
- Dale, Rodney (1985). The Sinclair Story. London: Gerald Duckworth & Co. ISBN 978-0-7156-1901-8.
- Laing, Gordon (2004). Digital retro. Lewes, England: The Ilex Press. ISBN 978-1-904705-39-0.
- Morris, Ben (2007). The Symbian OS architecture sourcebook: design and evolution of a mobile phone OS. Chichester, England: John Wiley and Sons. ISBN 978-0-470-01846-0.
- Nash, John C (1984). Effective scientific problem solving with small computers. Reston, VA: Reston Pub. Co. ISBN 978-0-8359-1596-0.
- Thomasson, Don (1983). The Ins and Outs of the Timex TS1000 & ZX81. Leighton Buzzard, England: Melbourne House. ISBN 978-0-86161-118-8.
- Vickers, Steve (1982). ZX81 BASIC Programming. Cambridge, England: Sinclair Research.

=== News reports ===
- Adamson, Ian; Kennedy, Richard (12 June 1986). "The decline of Uncle Clive". New Scientist. p. 33.
- Babsky, David (April 1983). "ZX81 v IBM PC". Which Micro?. pp. 34–36.
- Campbell, Robert (14 July 1983). "New clothes for IT in schools". New Scientist. p. 133.
- Cecco, Raffaele (June 1988). "Cecco's Log". CRASH. No. 53.
- "Charts and Analysis". Compute!. December 1982. pp. 56–59 – via Internet Archive.
- Church, Lynd (May 1982). "A piece of cake in Dundee". Sinclair User. pp. 53–55.
- Clarke, Robin (11 February 1982). "Microcomputers: No room at the inn". New Scientist. p. 390.
- Cooke, Claudia (August 1982). "Modest award winner sets the pace in micro design". Sinclair User. p. 56.
- Crisp, Jason (6 March 1981). "Sinclair launches new personal computer costing only £70". Financial Times. London. p. 6.
- Crisp, Jason (13 February 1982). "Sinclair to be marketed in U.S. by Timex". Financial Times. London. p. 3.
- Crisp, Jason (20 March 1982). "Why Sinclair thinks small is beautiful". Financial Times. London. p. 15.
- Eddy, Richard (July 1987). "Stonehenge in Space". CRASH. No. 42.
- "Faces of the week". BBC News. 8 August 2003. Archived from the original on 9 March 2021.
- Garrett, Billy (January 1983). "The Timex/Sinclair 1000". BYTE. Vol. 8, no. 1. pp. 364–370 – via Internet Archive.
- Gillies-Jones, Ray (22 June 2000). "Remember ZX80, ZX81, ZX Spectrum". Computer Weekly. Archived from the original on 11 October 2012 – via HighBeam Research.
- Goodwin, Simon N. (January 1988). "Tech Tips". CRASH. No. 48.
- Hancock, David (15 September 1996). "Zap! I'm a millionaire; A tiny computer bought by his mum set Dave Perry on the road to riches". Sunday Mirror.
- Hartnell, Tim (June–July 1981). "Review – The Sinclair ZX81". Your Computer. pp. 12–14.
- Hartnell, Tim (November 1981). "WH Smith brings ZX-81s to the high street". Your Computer. p. 37. Archived from the original on 16 March 2012.
- Hayman, Martin (June 1982). "Interview – Clive Sinclair". Practical Computing. pp. 54–64.
- "How the Spectrum began a revolution". BBC News. 23 April 2007. Archived from the original on 7 October 2025.
- Joscelyne, Svend (5 November 2009). "Industry Legend: Charles Cecil". Spong. Archived from the original on 28 September 2011.
- Kewney, Guy (3 May 1982). "Sinclair launches another low-cost microcomputer". InfoWorld.
- Krotoski, Aleks (3 November 2003). "Games in literature: Gibson explores the difference between UK and US". The Guardian.
- Lorenz, Christopher (15 April 1982). "The precarious balance between research, fashion and price". Financial Times. London. p. 18.
- Mackintosh, Hamish (23 September 1999). "Deep thought". The Guardian.
- Mackintosh, Hamish (27 January 2000). "Why the Discworld needs PCs". The Guardian.
- McClelland, David (18 March 2011). "How a BBC Micro shaped the course of GeekDad's life". Wired. Archived from the original on 30 December 2011.
- Munford, Roger (March 1984). "Smash Software". Your Spectrum.
- Needle, David (15 March 1982). "Times will market Sinclair computers". InfoWorld.
- Peltu, Malcolm (30 April 1981). "Paperback processing – The Sinclair ZX81 personal computer". New Scientist. p. 303.
- Reynolds, Matthew (28 June 2009). "Gaming – Interview – Rhianna Pratchett ('Overlord')". Digital Spy. Archived from the original on 7 February 2012.
- Scot, Duncan (August–September 1981). "Interview: Clive Sinclair". Your Computer. pp. 21–22.
- Shibata, Yoko (30 September 1982). "UK computer succeeds in Japan". Financial Times. London. p. 4.
- "The Sinclair Story, part two". Crash. No. 16. May 1985. p. 127 – via Internet Archive.
- Sinclair, Clive (26 June 1986). "Sinclair spectre". New Scientist. p. 81.
- "Sinclair's machine homes in on hobbyists". New Scientist. 7 February 1980. p. 402.
- "Sinclair's tinkering talent". Engineering Today. 22 February 1982. pp. 20–23.
- Taylor, Paul (21 November 1981). "Chips all round". Financial Times. London. p. 11.
- Tebbutt, Dave (June 1981). "Sinclair ZX81". Personal Computer World. Archived from the original on 6 April 2011.
- Tomkins, Stephen (11 March 2011). "ZX81: Small black box of computing desire". BBC News. Archived from the original on 17 July 2018.
- "Top developer's code for success". BBC News. 4 July 2003. Archived from the original on 2 April 2019.
- Valéry, Nicholas (19 May 1977). "Spare a byte for the family". New Scientist. pp. 405–406.
- Wallis, Alistair (15 February 2007). "Playing Catch Up: Match Day's Jon Ritman". Gamasutra. Archived from the original on 24 March 2007.
- "Why design if you can pinch it?". The Daily Telegraph. London. 30 May 1983. p. 8.
- Wise, Deborah (2 November 1981). "British company announces inexpensive computer". InfoWorld.
- "ZX-81 export deal signed with China". Sinclair User. November 1983. p. 17 – via Internet Archive.
- "ZX81 Software Scene: Golden Oldies". Sinclair User. No. 25. April 1984. p. 37 – via Internet Archive.

=== Other sources ===
- "The $99.95 Personal Computer". BYTE (Advertisement). Vol. 7, no. 8. August 1982. pp. 82–83 – via Internet Archive.
- "Explore the excellence of your ZX81 with a Memopak". BYTE (Advertisement). Vol. 7, no. 6. June 1982. p. 335 – via Internet Archive.
- "From Science of Cambridge: the new MK14" (advertisement). Cambridge, England: Science of Cambridge (1978)
- ZX81 Operating Supplement. Cambridge, England: Sinclair Research (1982)
- Sinclair ZX81 Personal Computer (brochure). Cambridge, England: Sinclair Research (undated, circa March 1981)
- Sinclair Research advertisement. Everyday Electronics, April 1981, pp. 284–285
- Sinclair Research advertisement. Popular Science, October 1982, pp. 284–285
- Sinclair ZX81 Home Computer, with "Mapsoft" keyboard attached. McManus Galleries, Dundee. Retrieved 13 January 2011
- TK85. Museu da Computação e Informática. Retrieved 2 January 2011
- ZX81DES1. Rick Dickinson, 24 August 2007. Retrieved 2 January 2011.
