= CP-500 =

Brazilian home computer

CP 500
- Developer: Luciano Deviá (lead designer)
- Manufacturer: Prológica
- Type: Home computer
- Released: 1982; 44 years ago
- Discontinued: 1985; 41 years ago
- Operating system: BASIC Level II, DOS 500, SO-8 (CP/M)
- CPU: Zilog Z80A @ 2 MHz
- Memory: 16 to 48 KiB RAM
- Storage: Audio cassette, Floppy disk
- Display: PAL-M video out (built-in RCA connector)
- Backward compatibility: TRS-80 Model III

CP 500 was a Brazilian family of personal computers designed and manufactured by Prológica.

== General information ==
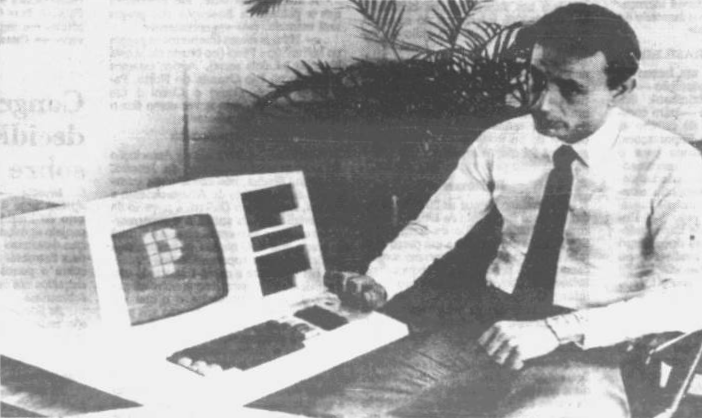
A photo of Carlos Roberto Gauch, Prológica's vice-president, next to a CP 500

The CP 500 range is compatible in terms of software and hardware with the American TRS-80 Model III, using the BASIC Level II language. All models, as well as virtually all of Prologica's computers, have their enclosures made of polyurethane resin, designed by Luciano Deviá.

== Models ==
=== CP 500 ===
Early model, released in April 1982. Sold in configuration without or with one or two full-height 5" 1/4, 178 KiB disc drives. There was also a graphite variation of this model released shortly before the release of the CP 500/M^{80}.

=== CP 500/M^{80} ===
Released in 1985, the cabinet color was changed from beige to graphite. Besides this aesthetic change, the machine could operate under SO-08, a clone of Digital Research's CP/M, being able to access up to 64 KiB of RAM and use the vast software library of existing CP/M software. With an RS-232 port (via an adapter connected to the proprietary CP532C port), it was also able to access the incipient videotext systems of the time.

=== CP 500/M^{80C} ===
Released in 1986 in white, it was 30% more compact than its predecessor (hence the "C" in the name), thanks to the use of 5" 1/4 slim height drives, now placed in a vertical position in the cabinet. This model no longer had the cassette recorder port, although there was the corresponding hole in the metal back panel and the appropriate spaces for the cassette circuit components on the main board. It remained in production until September 1988, even after the release of the CP 500/Turbo.

=== CP 500/Turbo ===
Last release of the range in 1987. Similar to the CP 500/M^{80C}, but in graphite color and with a faster 4 MHz CPU clock.

== Data Storage ==
Data storage was done in audio cassette tapes at 300 bits per second.

Audio cables were supplied with the computer for connection with a regular tape recorder.

== Bibliography ==
- ABREU, Carlos Alberto C. 77 programas para linha TRS-80. Rio de Janeiro: Microkit, 1985.
