= List of computer systems from Yugoslavia =

This is a list of computer systems that were significantly or completely designed in the former Yugoslavia before the breakup of the country in 1990s. This list does not include imported foreign computers. Some of these were assembled as per original manufacturer's license. See history of computer hardware in Yugoslavia for more information.

Picture	Type	Model	Manufacturer	Origin	Year	Notes
	Early	256 channel analyzer	Ruđer Bošković Institute	Croatia	1959	A two-metres high digital computer with logical circuits based on vacuum tubes; a 256-channel analyzer with memory, logic and programs that execute with million cycles per second
	Early	CER-10	Mihajlo Pupin Institute	Serbia	1960	First computer designed and produced in SFRY
	Early	CER-2	Mihajlo Pupin Institute	Serbia	~1960s	
	Early	CER-20	Mihajlo Pupin Institute	Serbia	1964	"electronic bookkeeping machine"
	Early	CER-200	Mihajlo Pupin Institute	Serbia	1966	
	Early	CER-202	Mihajlo Pupin Institute	Serbia	~1960s	
	Early	CER-22	Mihajlo Pupin Institute	Serbia	1967	Intended for banking applications
	Early	CER-12	Mihajlo Pupin Institute	Serbia	1971	"electronic computer for business data processing"
	Early	CER-203	Mihajlo Pupin Institute	Serbia	1971	"electronic computer for business applications"
	Hybrid	HRS-100	Mihajlo Pupin Institute	Serbia	1971	intended for scientific and technical research, modelling of complex dynamical systems in real and accelerated time
		TIM-100	Mihajlo Pupin Institute	Serbia	1985	Post office computer
		TIM-001	Mihajlo Pupin Institute	Serbia	1985	Development computer used in post offices
		TIM-600	Mihajlo Pupin Institute	Serbia		
	School	TIM-011	Mihajlo Pupin Institute	Serbia	~1987	HD64180-based computer with integrated green monochrome monitor, running CP/M with ZCPR3
		TIM-40M	Mihajlo Pupin Institute	Serbia		
		ATLAS‑TIM AT 32	Mihajlo Pupin Institute	Serbia		
	Home/School	Galaksija	Elektronika Inženjering	Serbia	1983	Extremely popular build-it-yourself computer designed by Voja Antonić
	Home/School	Galaksija Plus	-	Serbia	~1985	Enhanced version of Galaksija
	School/Home	Hobby ZR-84	MICROSYS Beočin	Serbia	1984	
	School/Home	Pecom 32	Ei Niš	Serbia	1985	
	School/Home	Pecom 64	Ei Niš	Serbia	1985	
	PC	Lira 512	Ei Niš	Serbia	1988	IBM PC XT compatible computer in Home computer form (mainboard is under the keyboard)
	PC	Lira AT	Ei Niš	Serbia	1989	IBM PC AT compatible computer
	PC	Lira 386	Ei Niš	Serbia	1990	PC 386 compatible computer
	PC	ET-188	Novkabel Novi Sad	Serbia	1985	IBM PC XT compatible computer
	School/Home	Misedo 85	Montex Ivangrad (Berane)	Montenegro	1985	The clone of Tandy's TRS-80 Color Computer 2
	PLC	PA512	Ivo Lola Ribar	Serbia	1980	
	School	Lola 8	Ivo Lola Ribar	Serbia	~1982	
	PLC	LPA512	Ivo Lola Ribar	Serbia	1986	
(none)	theoretical	NAR 1	(none)	Serbia	?	Created by Nedeljko Parezanović
(none)	theoretical	NAR 2	(none)	Serbia	?	Created by Nedeljko Parezanović
	School	Galeb	PEL Varaždin	Croatia	1984	
	School	Orao	PEL Varaždin	Croatia	1984	Successor to Galeb
	School	Ivel Ultra	Ivasim	Croatia		Apple II compatible. Also known as "Impuls 9020"
	Home	Ivel Z3	Ivasim	Croatia		Apple IIe compatible
		1680	Iskradata	Slovenia	1979	
	Mainframe	800	Iskra Delta	Slovenia	1984	PDP-11/34 compatible
	?	Partner	Iskra Delta	Slovenia	1983	
		Triglav	Iskra Delta	Slovenia	1985	Option to swap between three processing units
	Home	Dialog	Gorenje	Slovenia	?	
	School/Engineering	Vuk	(prototype)	Serbia	1988	Created by a group of students from Leskovac
	School/Office/Army	IRIS 8	IRIS - Energoinvest Sarajevo	Bosnia and Herzegovina	1984	Apple II compatible.
	PC	IRIS PC16	IRIS - Energoinvest Sarajevo	Bosnia and Herzegovina	1986	IBM PC AT compatible.

== See also ==
- History of computer hardware in Yugoslavia
