= History of computer hardware in Yugoslavia =

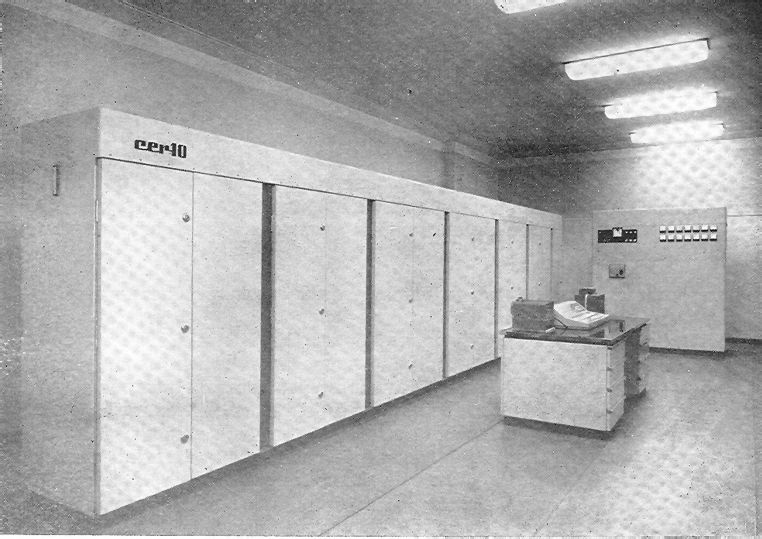
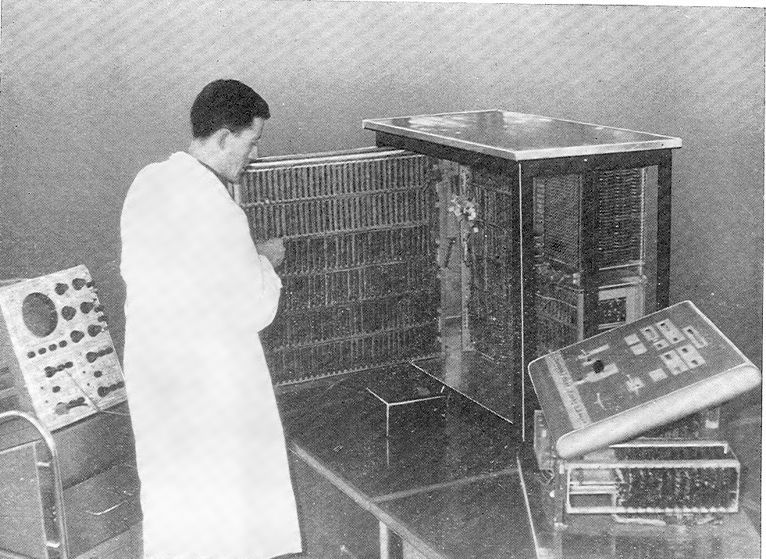
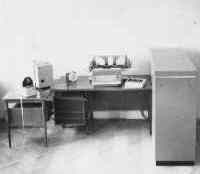
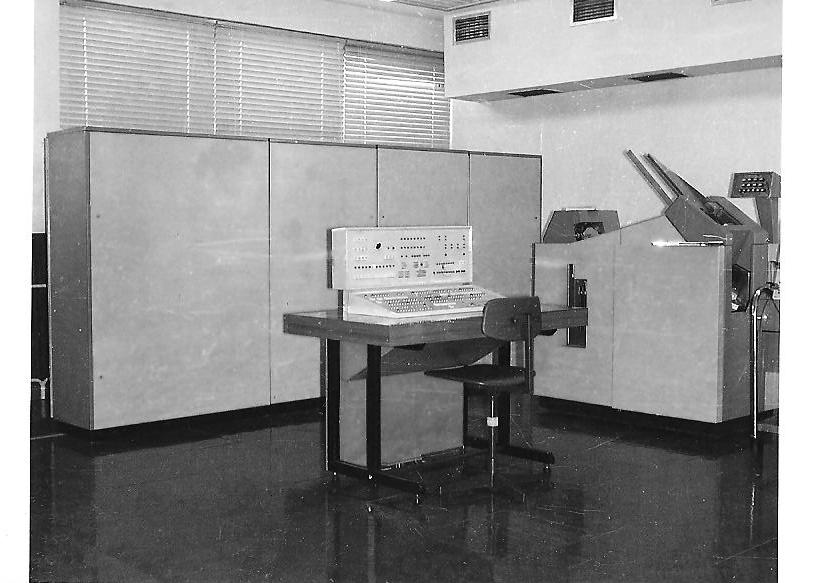
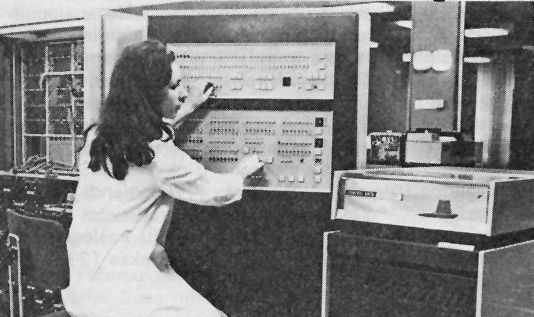
CER Computers throughout the decades (top to bottom, left to right): CER-10 from 1960; CER-20 from 1964; CER-200 from 1966; CER-22 from 1967; CER-12 from 1971

To protect domestic production from foreign competition, which was often done to an excessive degree and to the detriment of the local consumer and industry, the Socialist Federal Republic of Yugoslavia (SFRY) enforced strict import regulations. These restrictions had a role in the development of the computer industry in this country, other than in the Western world. One of the fundamental ideologies that influenced computer development in Yugoslavia was the need for independence from foreign manufacturers producing spare parts, contributing to the development of domestically produced computers.

== Development ==
=== Early computers ===
In former Yugoslavia, at the end of 1962, there were 30 installed electronic computers. In 1966, there were 56, and in 1968, there were 95. After receiving specialised training in foreign computer institutes - in Paris in 1954 and 1955 (T. Aleksić and A. Mandžić); in Darmstadt and Vienna in 1959 (V. Masnikosa); in Cambridge in 1961 (P. Vrbanac) and in London in 1964 (D. Hristović) - engineers from the BK-Vincha Institute, later accompanied with engineers form the Michailo Pupin Institute in Belgrade, led by professor doctor Tihomir Aleksić, began the development of the first domestic computer hardwares in late 1950s. This project resulted in the creation of the CER series of computers (Cifarski Elektronski Računar - "Digital Electronic Computer" in english), beginning with the model CER-10, developed in Vincha in 1960, a computer based on vacuum tubes and electronic relays.

By the year 1964, the development of the computer CER-20, which was intended to serve as an "electronic bookkeeping machine”, given the manufacturers recognition of the ever-growing accounting market, was finished. The special-purpose trend of business-computer development was continued with the creation of the CER-22 model in 1967. It was intended to be used in banks and communal businesses for online operations. There were also other CER models, such as the CER-12, CER-11, CER-111 and CER-200, but there is not much information available about them.

During the late 1970s, the "Ei-Niš computer center" from Niš, Serbia, began constructing the Mainframe H6000 computer models under the licence Honeywell. They were intended to be used mainly for banking purposes. In the beginning, the computer was a great success, which led to the expansion of the local industry in areas lacking availability. The company also built models such as the H6 and H66, which remained popular even in early 2000s, under the name "Bull HN". The H6 models were assembled in enterprises like Telecom and ran the GCOS operating system. They were also used for education purposes - Honeywell's H6 model was installed in the "Nikola Tesla" school of electronic engineering and trade in Niš, and was used for education and training during the 80s, until the creation of personal computers.

=== Import ===
Over time, as it began to be more apparent that the domestic science and industry were not yet in capacity to keep track with the global computer development, foreign computers were allowed to be imported in the country, under specific conditions and permits. Consequently, this led to the market being overdominated by foreign products, reducing the relative market share of locally produced computers. On the other hand, caused by the increasing demand on the market, systems made by local companies, such as Mihajlo Pupin Institute (initially CER series and later TIM series, e.g., TIM-100 and TIM-600) and Iskra Delta (e.g., model 800, based on the PDP-11/34) continued with their development during the 1970s, even into the 1980s.

=== Early 1980s: the domestic computers era ===
Many different companies attempted to create microcomputers similar to the home computers from the 1980s, such as Ivo Lola Ribar Institute's Lola 8, Mihajlo Pupin Institute's TIM-001, EI's Pecom 32 and 64, PEL Varaždin's Galeb (computer) and Orao, Ivel Ultra and Ivel Z3, etc. The Josef Stefan Institute in Ljubljana made the first 16-bit microcomputer PMP-11 under the leadership of Marijan Miletić, former technical director of Iskra-Delta in 1984. It had a 8 MHz DEC T-11 CPU, a maximum of 64 kB RAM, a 10 MB hard disk, a 8" diskette and two RS-232 ports for VT-100 video terminal and COM. Branko Jevtić modified the RT-11 operating system so plenty of DEC-11 applications were available. Around 50 machines were made before the IBM AT became widely available. Multiple factors prevented them from reaching success on markets outside the domestic computer market: they were overly expensive for individual consumers (especially in comparison to popular foreign computers such as the ZX Spectrum, Commodore 64, etc.), the limited selection of entertainment and other types of programs made them appear unattractive to the contemporary computer enthusiasts, and they were not available for purchase in stores.

As a result, the domestically manufactured computers of these generations were predominantly used in government institutions which were prohibited to purchase imported equipment. The computers which could have been connected to the existing mainframe computers as terminals reached greater success in business companies, while others were used in schools for education purposes. Given that all medium and large enterprises in the country were government-owned, this was still a significant part of the domestic market, which explains both the unnatural relative success of domestic business computers, as well as why the IBM PC/AT and compatibles had a low influx in the local business market.

The government, in an attempt to prevent the import of foreign computers from growing, introduced restrictions in terms of price and memory size. In spite of those restrictions, consumers continued to import foreign computers, either illegally or disassembled in parts, which made it possible for them to bypass restrictions. This case of improper legislation and this example of what is called the "grey market" are what further contributed to the collapse of domestic computer industry. By the middle of the decade, the domestic computer market was, much like in the rest of the Europe, dominated by the Commodore 64, and the ZX Spectrum as a runner up.

One computer model managed to stand out: the Galaksija ("Galaxy" in English), whose creator, Voja Antonić, in a special issue of a popular magazine called Galaksija, under the name Računari u vašoj kući (eng. Computers in your home), published the diagrams and instructions for unassisted construction of the video game computer, in January 1984. Although initially not available for purchase in assembled form, the computer was built unassisted by thousands of enthusiasts, and a small amount of them was produced for usage in elementary and high schools.

Home computers had become so popular in the SFRY that even certain radio stations broadcast programs usually distributed by compact cassettes (e.g. Ventilator 202 series, Radio Študent Ljubljana, etc.). Software piracy (copyright infringement of software) was a common phenomenon and pirates freely issued their advertisements even in popular computer magazines such as Računar ("Computer" in english), Svet kompjutera ("Computer world" in english), Moj mikro ("My micro" in english) and Revija za mikroračunala ("Journal of microcomputers" in english). The cheap pirate software made it possible for any home computer owner to become a self-developed collector of hundreds of programs, which had both positive and negative economic consequences; resources for development were easily accessible, which produced a great number of various specialists who were known worldwide, but failed to succeed on their local market due to the same piracy which made their education available.

=== Late 1980s - the era of personal computers (PC) ===
The second half of the 1980s brought increased popularity of the IBM PC compatible computers among business users, and a fewer number of 16-bits computers like the Amiga and the Atari ST, but mostly on the enthusiast market. The mainstream home computer market was still largely dominated by the ubiquitous C-64. Local manufacturers also created some IBM PC compatible computer models, such as those from the TIM series of microcomputers (IMP) (e.g. TIM-100 and Lira), and the first domestic Unix workstation; Iskra Delta's Triglav was in one of the configurations shipped with the Microsoft Xenix. However, their success was limited only to the institutions obliged to use domestically produced equipment.

The grey economy (illegal economic activity) continued to perssist and facilitate market dominance of foreign produced technology amongst local consumers, and software infringement remained alive until the very end of the SFRY in the 1990s. Just before the collapse of the Federal Republic in 1989, a company called Sesam started a local distribution of personal computers around the Belgrade area, which included the popular ,,Konferencija" ("Conference" in english). In 1996, Sesam reoriented to Internet.

== Timeline ==
1959

- A team led by Branco Souchek from 1955-1959. created the ,,256 channel analyzer”, digital computer at the Ruđer Bošković Institute

1960

- The Michailo Pupin Institute created the first digital computer in the SFRY CER-10.

1964

- The Mihajlo Pupin Institute created the CER-20, the first "electronic bookkeeping machine".

1966

- The Mihajlo Pupin Institute presented the CER-200, a series of mini business-computers.

1967

- The Mihajlo Pupin Institute created the CER-22, "computer for online-banking".

1971

- The Mihajlo Pupin Institute presented the first hybrid computer system, the XPC-100 for ANSSSR, in Moscow.
- The Michailo Pupin Institute released the CER-12 computer system used for business data processing in ERC’s.
- The Mihajlo Pupin Institute released the CER-203 computer series.

1979

- Iskra Data released the Iskra Data 1680.

1981

- The Ivo Lola Ribar Institute released the industrial programmable logic controller PA512.

1983

- The Mihajlo Pupin Institute developed a computer system for real time picture generation, and the microcomputer TIM-001 created by doctor Dragolyb Milichevich and his team.
- The Iskra Delta presented the "Partner", a computer based on the Z80A microprocessor.
- Instructions for the unassisted construction of the video-game computers Galaksija, created by Voja Antonich, were published in the magazine "Računari u vašoj kući".

1984

- Iskra Delta created the model 800, based on the PDP-11/34.
- PEL Varaždin developed the "Galeb", which will later be replaced by the computer "Orao".

1985

- The Mihajlo Pupin Institute developed the TIM-100, a series of computers with microprocessors for the post-office.
- The Mihajlo Pupin Institute released a microcomputer model, the TIM-100, for application development.
- PEL Varaždin created the computer "Orao" for education purposes in schools.
- A modern version of the "Galaksija" called "Galaksija Plus" was created.
- Electronic Industry presented the Pecom 32 and Pecom 64 for use in certain high schools.
- The Ivo Lola Ribar Institute advocated its computer model "Lola 8" for the technology fair taking place in the same year.

1986

- The Ivo Lola Ribar Institute released the industrial programmable logic controller LPA512.
- The Institute for computer and informational systems ENERGOINVEST IRIS presented the computer model IRIS PC-16.

1988

- The Mihajlo Pupin Institute developed the 32B computer system TIM-600.
- The Mihajlo Pupin Institute developed the computer model TIM-011 based on the HD64180 microprocessor (compatible with the Z80), integrated with green monochrome monitor for lecture purposes in Serbian high schools.

1989

- On April 6th, the Institute for computer and informational systems ENERGOINVEST IRIS presented a series of multiuser computers IRIS MUV (IRIS - Motorola-Unix-VME) with a Motorola 68030 architecture.

== See also ==
- List of computer systems from Yugoslavia
- History of computer hardware in Eastern Bloc countries
