= Iskra (disambiguation) =

Iskra was a 1900–1905 communist newspaper. The word means "spark" in many Slavic languages.

Iskra may also refer to:

== People ==
- Iskra Babich (1932–2001), Soviet film director and screenwriter
- Iskra Dimitrova (born 1965), Macedonian artist
- Iskra Lawrence (born 1990), English model
- Iskra Mihaylova (born 1957), Bulgarian politician
- Iskra Velinova (born 1953), Bulgarian rower

== Places ==
- İskra, former name of Aşağı Kəsəmən, Azerbaijan
- Iskra, Kuyavian-Pomeranian Voivodeship (north-central Poland)
- Iskra, Parvomay village in Plovdiv region, Bulgaria
- Iskra, Kardzhali Province, Bulgaria
- Iskra, Silistra Province, Bulgaria
- Iskra, Chüy, a village in Chüy District, Kyrgyzstan
- Iskra, Orenburg Oblast, village in Sakmarsky District, Orenburg Oblast, Russia
- Iskra, Kursky District, Kursk Oblast, settlement in Kursky District, Kursk Oblast, Russia

== Technology ==
- ISKRA lasers, used for laser fusion experiments at VNIIEF Russia
- Iskra (camera), 1960–1963 Soviet camera
- Lada Iskra, a subcompact sedan
- PZL TS-11 Iskra, a Polish jet aircraft

=== Soviet Union ===
- Iskra-1030, Soviet Intel 8086-type personal computer
- Iskra-125
- Iskra-1256
- Iskra 226, Soviet Wang 2200-based personal computer

=== Slovenia ===
- Iskra Delta Partner, Slovenia
- Iskra Delta 800

== Sports teams ==
- NK Iskra Bugojno, a football club in Bosnia and Herzegovina
- FK Iskra Danilovgrad, a football club from Montenegro
- ISKRA, volleyball club based in Odintsovo, Moscow Oblast, Russia
- FC Iskra-Stal, a football club from Moldova.

== Other ==
- Iskra (company), an electronic equipment manufacturer in Yugoslavia, now broken up into many parts, some with "Iskra" in the name
- Iskra (Egyptian communist organisation)
- Iskra (film), a 2017 Montenegrin film
- Iskra (magazine), a 19th-century Russian satirical weekly
- Iskra 1903, Iskra 1904 and Iskra 1912, free jazz groups of Paul Rutherford
- Operation Iskra

== See also ==
- Iskar (disambiguation)
