= TIM-001 =

1983 application development microcomputer

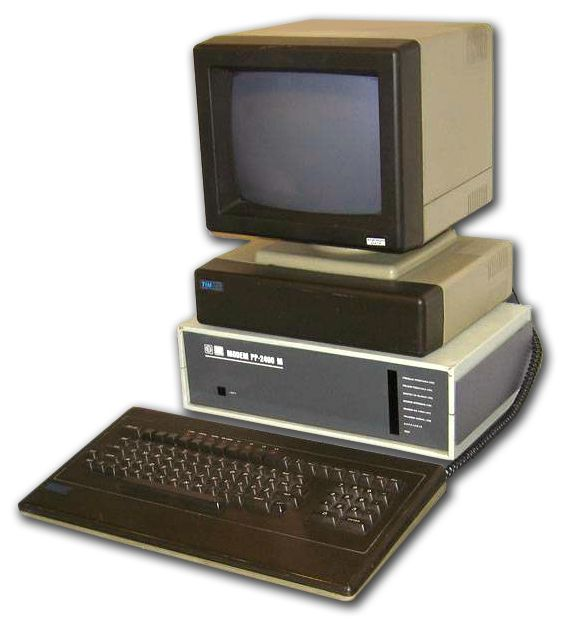
- TIM-001 with Ei PP-2400 M modem
- Developer: Mihajlo Pupin Institute
- Released: 1983; 43 years ago
- Units sold: 1200
- Operating system: TIMOS, TRANSOS
- CPU: Intel 80386
- Memory: 8 MB
- Removable storage: 3.5 or 5.25-inch floppy disks
- Predecessor: TIM-100

TIM-001 was an application development microcomputer developed by Mihajlo Pupin Institute (Serbia) in 1983/84.

It was part of the TIM series of computers, a follow up to the previous CER series of machines and the XPC-100 system.

The machine was created by Dr. Dragoljub Milicevic and Dr. Dusan Starcevic. TIM-001 was a highly specialized computer, but could run the same software as TIM-100 and was compatible with modems such as the Ei PP-2400 M.

== See also ==
- Mihajlo Pupin Institute
