= Lists of computers =

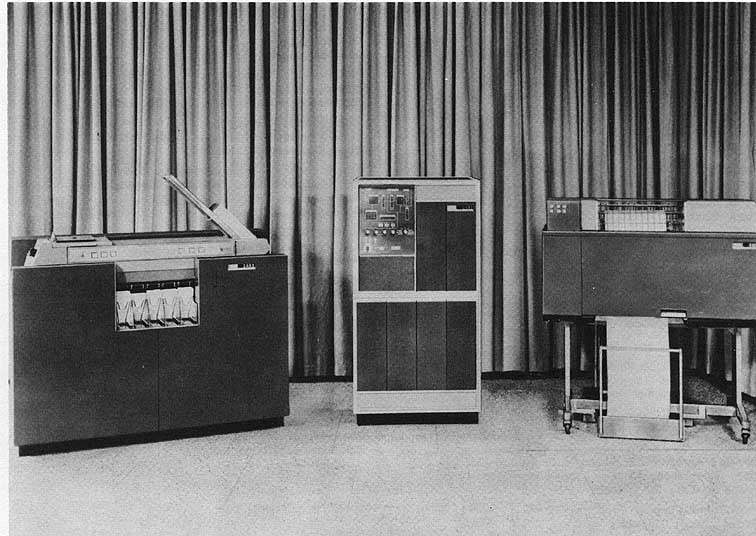
IBM 1401: Card reader, processor, printer (1961). Up to 16k memory, able to process hundreds of cards per minute.

Lists of computers cover computers, or programmable machines, by period, type, vendor and region.

== Early computers ==
- List of vacuum-tube computers
- List of transistorized computers
- List of early third-generation computers
- List of early microcomputers
- List of computers with on-board BASIC
- List of computers running CP/M

== More recent computers ==
- List of home computers
  - List of home computers by video hardware
- List of fastest computers
- Lists of mobile computers
- List of fictional computers

== Vendor-specific ==
- List of Apple II clones
- List of HP business desktops
- List of IBM Personal Computer models
- List of IBM PS/2 models
- List of Mac models
  - List of Mac models grouped by CPU type
- List of third-party Micro Channel computers
- List of Thomson computers
- List of TRS-80 and Tandy-branded computers
- List of TRS-80 clones
- List of VAX computers
- List of ZX Spectrum clones
- List of ZX80 and ZX81 clones

== Regional ==
- List of British computers
- List of computer systems from Croatia
- List of computer systems from Serbia
- List of computer systems from Slovenia
- List of computer systems from the Socialist Federal Republic of Yugoslavia
- List of Soviet computer systems
