= CER-11 =

Portable military computer

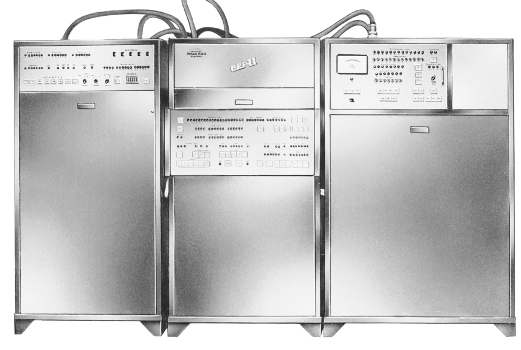
CER-11 military computer

CER-11 was a portable digital military computer, developed at Institute Mihajlo Pupin, located in Serbia, in a period between 1965 and 1966.

== Overview ==
CER-11 was designed by Prof. Dr. Tihomir Aleksic and Prof. Dr Nedeljko Parezanovic, along with their associates ( M. Momcilovic, D. Hristovic, M. Maric, M. Hruska, P. Vrbavac et al.). . The computer was based on the transistor-diode logic circuitry and the paper tape equipments. This digital computer was used in SFRY's Army JNA until 1988.

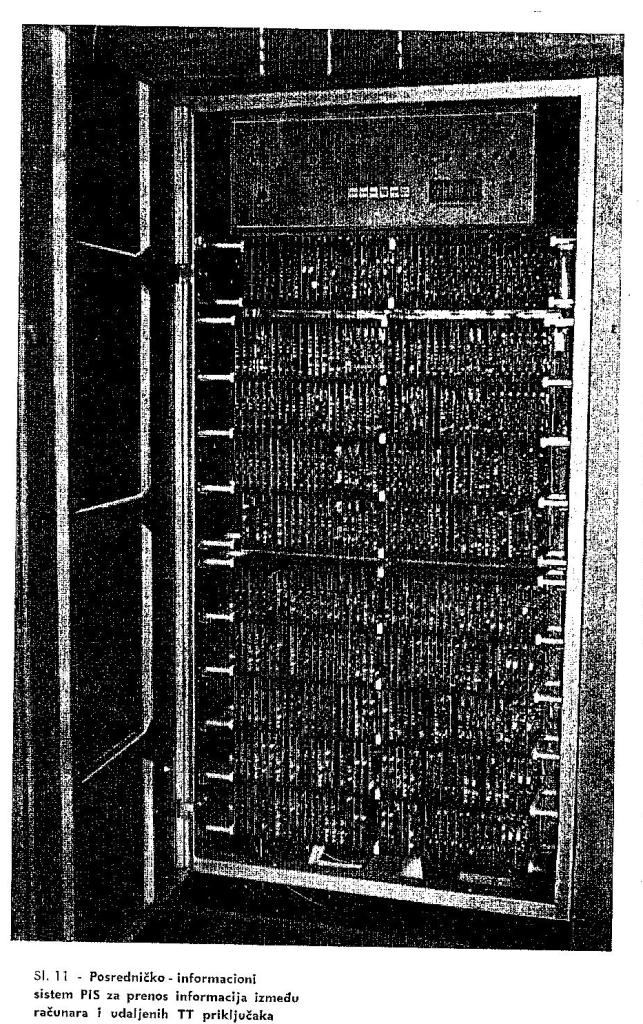
CER-11 computer (inside view)

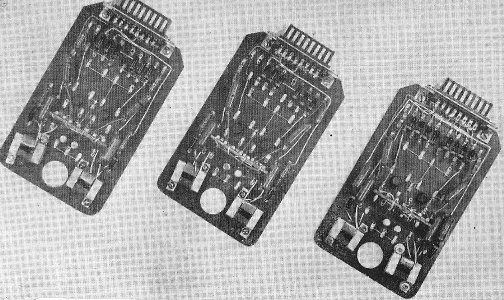
Memory sense amplifiers for CER computers.

== See also ==
- Tihomir Aleksic
- CER Computers
- Institute Mihajlo Pupin
- History of computer hardware in the SFRY
