= Iskar =

Iskar may refer to:

Bulgaria

- Iskar (river), a river in western Bulgaria
- Iskar Reservoir, situated on the Iskar River
- Iskar (town), a town in the Iskar Municipality of the Pleven Province
- Iskar Municipality
- Iskar, Sofia, one of 24 municipalities in the Bulgaria's Sofia (city) province
- Iskar, Varna Province, a village in the Valchi Dol Municipality of Varna Province
- Iskar–Panega Geopark
- Iskar Stadium, Samokov, Sofia Province
- Iskar Gorge

Afghanistan

- Iskar, Afghanistan

Antarctica

- Iskar Glacier, Livingston Island, Antarctica

== See also ==
- Iskra (disambiguation)
- Iscah, daughter of Haran in the Book of Genesis
