= CER-22 =

Transistor based computer

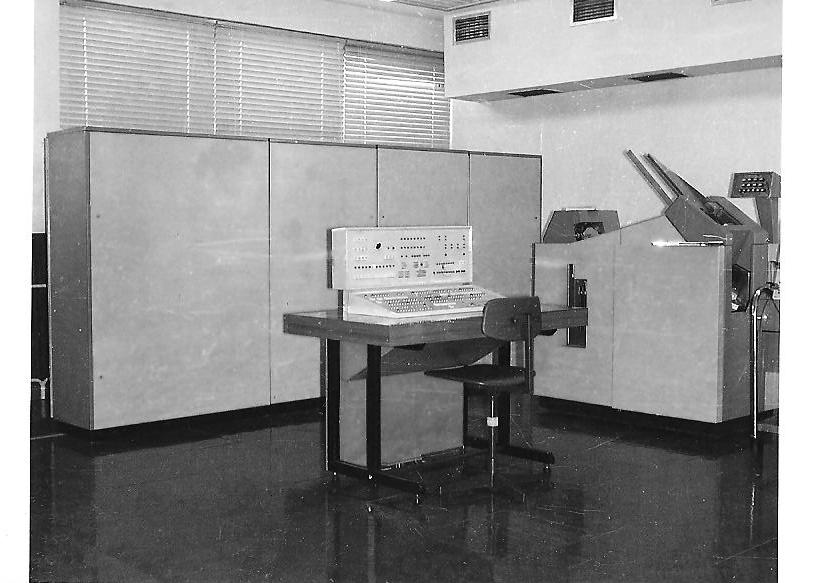
CER-22 at the ERC BeoBank

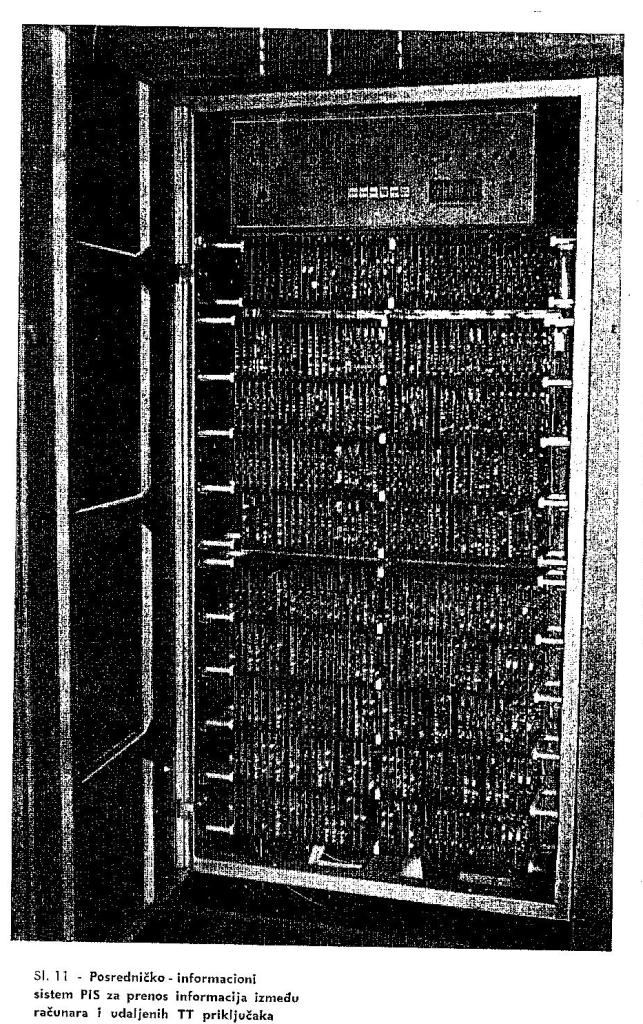
CER-22 (inside) at the BeoBank

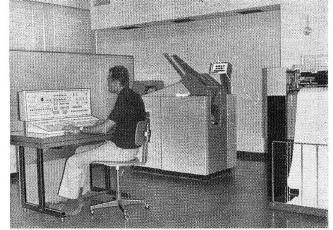
CER-22 computer in the work

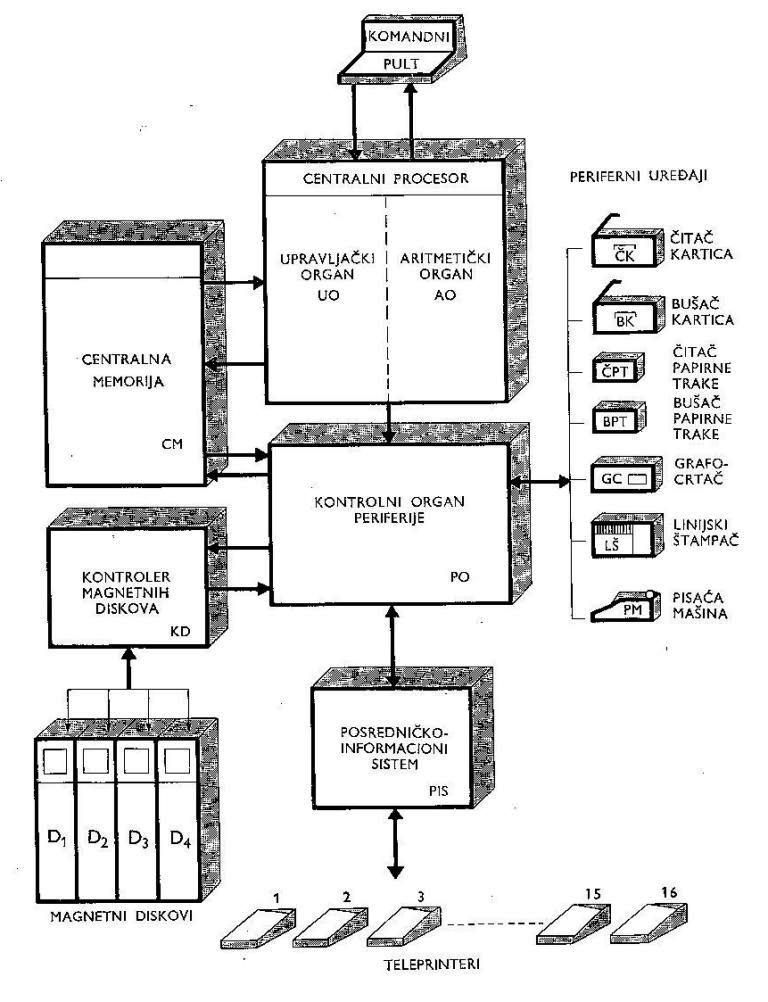
CER-22 system, drawings; see ref.2

CER (Serbian: Цифарски Електронски Рачунар – Digital Electronic Computer) model 22 is a transistor based computer developed by Mihajlo Pupin Institute (Serbia) in 1967-1968. It was originally intended for banking applications and was used for data processing and management planning in banks, trade and utility companies in Belgrade. Three CER-22 computers were purchased by Beobanka, Jugopetrol and BVK–Belgrade companies. (For more details see: Ref.# 1, #2, #3, and #4).

The principal designers and chiefs of the project teams were:

- Dušan Hristović, Svetomir Ojdanić, Veselin Potić, Radivoje Ilić et al. for Beobanka;
- Dr Sc. Miroslav Jocković, Branimir Leposavic, Michael Savikin, Ljubivoje Marković et al., for Jugopetrol co.;
- Vladislav Paunović, Miloš Marjanović, Petar Vrbavac, Dragiša Tinković et al. for BVK-Belgrade.

== Technical characteristics of the CER-22 ==
- Technology: IC (MSI), transistor and diode logic circuits (See also: Ref. #2, #5, #6).
- Printed circuits boards with the ribbon connectors;
- CPU performance: the 16-cycle instructions (10 microseconds);
- Magnetic core memory: 32 KB capacity (memory cycle time of 2 microseconds);
- Disk storage CDC-854 (max 8 disk units);
- Card reader and puncher: 300 cards/min and 150 cards/min;
- Paper tape reader and puncher, type "Facit": 1000 characters/s and 150 characters/s;
- Parallel Line Printer, type DP MZ-4: 128 characters/line, 600 lines/min.

== See also ==
- CER Computers
- CER-10
- Mihajlo Pupin Institute,
- History of computer hardware in the SFRY
