= CER-203 =

Early computer designed for business and accounting

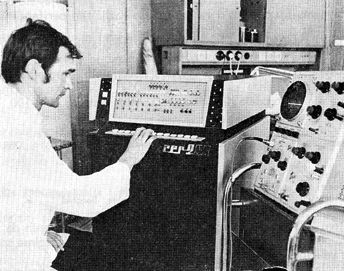
CER-203: CPU testing

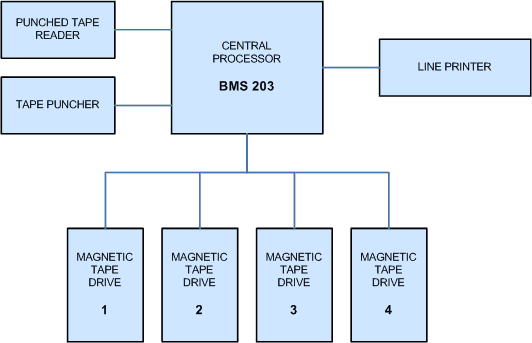
Block diagram

CER (Serbian: Цифарски Електронски Рачунар – Digital Electronic Computer) model 203 is an early digital computer developed by Mihajlo Pupin Institute (Serbia) in 1971. It was designed to process data of medium-sized businesses:

- In banks, for managing and processing of accounts, bookkeeping, foreign-currency and interest calculations, amortization plans and statistics
- In manufacturing, for production planning and management, market data processing and forecasting, inventory management, financial document management and process modelling
- In utilities, to calculate water and electricity consumption, to produce various reports and lists and for technical calculations and design
- In construction industry for network planning method design, financial management and bookkeeping
- In trading companies for payment processing, market analysis, inventory management and customer and partner relationship management

== Specifications ==
Central Processing:

- Type: BMS-203
- Number of instructions: 32
- Performance:
  - one 16-cycle instruction: 20 μs
  - one single cycle instruction: 5 μs
  - addition and/or subtraction of two 15-digit numbers: 20 μs

Primary memory:

- Capacity: 8 kilowords
- Speed (cycle time): 1 μs
- Complete, autonomous memory error checking
- Parity control

Punched tape reader:

- Dielectric-based reading
- Speed: 500 to 1,000 characters per second
- Accepts 5, 7 and 8-channel tapes

Tape puncher:

- Speed: 75 characters per second

Parallel Line Printer 667:

- "On the fly" printing
- 128 characters per line
- Removable/replaceable printing cylinder
- Speed:
  - 500 lines per minute for a character set of 63 characters
  - 550 lines per minute for a character set of 50 characters
- Automatic paper feeder
- Two line spacing settings
- Programamtic tape for discontinuous paper movement
- Maximum number of carbon copies: 6

Independent Printer M 30:

- 132 characters per line
- Speed:
  - Prints 25 alphanumeric characters per second
  - Prints 33 numeric characters per second
  - Tabulation speed: 144 characters per second
  - Blank printing speed: 100 characters per second
- Maximum number of carbon copies: 6

Magnetic cassettes 4096:

- Capacity: 600,000 characters
- Variable record length
- Transfer rate: 857 characters per second
- Tape speed: 10 inches per second

Magnetic Tape Drives:

- Data format: 9-track ASCII with inter-record space of 0.6 inches (1.52 cm)
- Data density: 556/800 bits per inch
- Capacity per tape: c. 10,000,000 characters
- Tape speed: 24 inches/s, 150 inches/s fast-forward and rewind
- Transfer rate: 19.2 kHz
- Tape width: 1/2 inch (1.27 cm)
- Tape length: 2,400 ft (731.52 m)
- Working ambient temperature range: 5 °C to 40 °C
- Relative humidity: up to 80%
- Integrated circuit control logic
- Separate control panel for each drive
- Read/Write Capabilities:
  - Read and Write forward
  - Read forward
  - Read reverse

== See also ==
- CER Computers
- Mihajlo Pupin Institute
- History of computer hardware in the SFRY
