= Ivo Lola Ribar Institute =

Serbian manufacturer

- Native name: Институт Иво Лола Рибар
- Founded: 27 October 2006; 19 years ago (Current form); 1963; 63 years ago (Founded)
- Headquarters: Kneza Viseslava 70a, Belgrade, Serbia
- Key people: Srećko Manasijević (Director)
- Revenue: ▲€0.64 million (2017)
- Owner: Government of Serbia
- Number of employees: 38 (2017)
- Website: www.li.rs

Ivo Lola Ribar Institute (Serbian Cyrillic: Институт Иво Лола Рибар) is a Serbian manufacturer of heavy machine tools, robotics, industrial equipment and industrial computers, headquartered in Belgrade, Serbia.

== History ==
Ivo Lola Ribar Institute was founded in 1963 by decree of the Government of Serbia. It has been named after People's Hero of Yugoslavia Ivo Lola Ribar, the youngest son of Ivan Ribar.

In current form, the institute operates since 31 December 1985. During the 1980s, it was one of the leading technology institutes in former Yugoslavia.

== See also ==
- Lola 8 – computer developed by Ivo Lola Ribar Institute
- PA512 and LPA512 – industrial controllers developed by ILR
- History of computer hardware in Yugoslavia
- List of computer systems from Yugoslavia
