= Branko Souček =

Croatian scientist

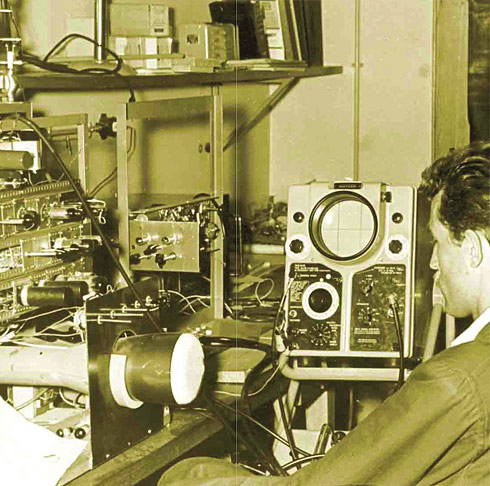
Brank Souček and his team's "256-channel analyzer" from 1959

Branko Souček (Bjelovar, 25 April 1930 – Bari, 12 December 2014) was a Croatian academic and computer scientist who authored the first Croatian-made digital computer and the first computer paper in 1959. Souček founded the first laboratory of Cybernetics. Souček and IRIS are the authors and editors of ten books presenting the Sixth Generation Projects results.

== Biography ==
Souček was born in 1930 in Bjelovar, at that time part of the Kingdom of Yugoslavia. He was of Czech descent through his father František. He graduated in electrical engineering at the Zagreb University in 1955. He subsequently worked at the Ruđer Bošković institute from 1955 to 1976. By the year 1959 at the institute, he devised and led a team to construct the first digital computer in the country. He constructed the project "256-channel analyzer, memory, logic and programs" and published it in the journal "Elektrotehnika" in 1959. Souček's computer was advanced for its time and it aroused global interest from the scientific circles. The director of the Brookhaven National Laboratory, William Higinbotham, personally came to Yugoslavia to see the computer. The computer was about 2 metres high, the programmes were executed with million cycles per second, logical circuits were based on vacuum tubes. It was the recipient of numerous awards in 1960 and 1963.

He was a corresponding member of the Croatian Academy of Sciences and Arts. He was an associate member in United Nations Industrial Development Organization and International Atomic Energy Agency as well as NASA, IBM, Siemens, Schering, BNL and the Ruđer Bošković institute. He was a member of the American Association for the Advancement of Science.

His biography was included in various publications, such as "International scientist 2003", "Who's Who in the world 2001.", and "Who's Who in science and engineering 2004".

== Work ==
Branko Souček spent fifty years working out the self-organization of life intelligence. Over this time period, Souček pioneered research, development, and theory on a universal set of cell, brain, mind, and sex laws describing the fundamental nature of courting and mating.

- Cell Internal Language Organization (CILO)
- Brain Internal Language Organization (BILO)
- Mind, Language Bank and Trust
- Natural and Financial Sex Behaviour

== Neural and Intelligent Systems ==
The theory behind intelligent systems can be viewed as a complement to the genetic DNA code. At the core of mind and brain is quantum information processing. Souček discovered that through primary waveforms, neural networks and mental processes such as memory and behavior are generated from agents or oscillators in neural structures. Furthermore, these quantum processes describe the fundamental mechanics of individual neurons and their interactions present within consciousness. These mechanics can be studied to reveal their processes and features.

On a macro-level, primary oscillators can be studied to explain psychological phenomena and behavior.

== Publications ==
- Minicomputers, Microprocessors and Microcomputers, 1972.
- Minicomputers in Data Processing and Simulation, 1972.
- Microprocessors and Microcomputers, 1976.
- Computers in Neurobiology and Behavior, 1976.
- Neural and Massively Parallel Computers: The Sixth Generation, 1988.
- Neural and Concurrent Real-Time Systems: The Sixth Generation (Sixth-Generation Computer Technology Series), 1989.
- Neural and Intelligent Systems Integration: Fifth and Sixth Generation Integrated Reasoning Information Systems (Sixth-Generation Computer Technology Series), 1991.
- Dynamic, Genetic, and Chaotic Programming: The Sixth-Generation (Sixth-Generation Computer Technology Series), 1992.
- Fast Learning and Invariant Object Recognition: The Sixth-Generation Breakthrough (Sixth-Generation Computer Technology Series), 1992.
- Fuzzy, Holographic, and Parallel Intelligence: The Sixth-Generation Breakthrough (Sixth-Generation Computer Technology Series), 1992.
- Frontier Decision Support Concepts: Help Desk, Learning, Fuzzy Diagnoses, Quality Evaluation, Prediction, Evolution (Sixth-Generation Computer Technology Series), 1994.
- Quantum Mind Networks, 1997.
- Better Life and Business: Cell, Brain, Mind and Sex Universal Laws, 2013.
