= CER-202 =

Digital computer

CER (Serbian: Цифарски Електронски Рачунар – Digital Electronic Computer) model 202 is an early digital computer developed by Mihajlo Pupin Institute (Serbia) in the 1960s.

== See also ==
- CER Computers
- Mihajlo Pupin Institute
