= Iskra Delta =

Slovenian computer manufacturer

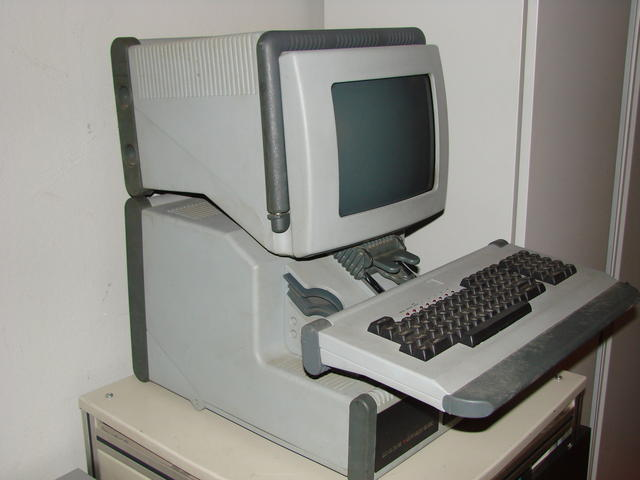
Triglav

Iskra Delta was a computer manufacturer from Slovenia, and one of the biggest computer producers in SFR Yugoslavia that saw its own end with the breakup of the country. It started in 1974 as Elektrotehna, the Ljubljana representative of Digital Equipment Corporation, a USA minicomputer manufacturer with an office in Belgrade. It began assembling PDP-11 minicomputers in Ljubljana from DEC processors and Ampex disks in 1978. Rapid expansion over all major Yugoslav Republics. It had a joint venture with Energoinvest, Sarajevo. Video terminals' assembly was in Paka, Slovenj Gradec. Forced merger with Iskra and Gorenje computer divisions resulted in Iskra-Delta's enlargement to 2,000 employees. Delays with microcomputer technology and freer import brought its collapse in 1988.

Iskra Delta's bankruptcy proceedings began on February 5, 1990 and were completed in February 2021, after 31 years.

== See also ==
- Iskra Delta 800
- Iskra Delta Partner
- Triglav
- Iskradata 1680
- History of computer hardware in the SFRY
