= CER-200 =

Early digital computer

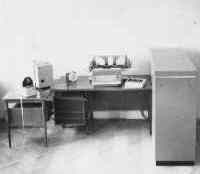
CER-200

CER (Serbian: Цифарски Електронски Рачунар – Digital Electronic Computer) model 200 is an early digital computer developed by the Mihajlo Pupin Institute (IMP) of Serbia in 1966.

== See also ==
- CER Computers
- Mihajlo Pupin Institute
- History of computer hardware in the SFRY
