= CER-20 =

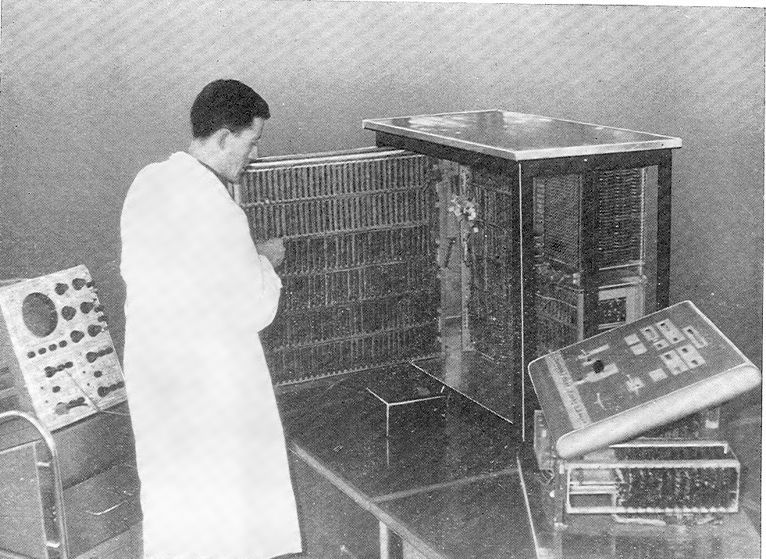
CER-20 being assembled

CER (Serbian: Цифарски Електронски Рачунар / Cifarski Elektronski Računar - Digital Electronic Computer) model 20 was an early digital computer developed by Mihajlo Pupin Institute (Serbia). It was designed as a functioning prototype of an "electronic bookkeeping machine". The first prototype was planned for 1964.

== See also ==
- CER Computers
- Mihajlo Pupin Institute
- History of computer hardware in the SFRY
