= TIM-100 =

1985 PTT teller microcomputer

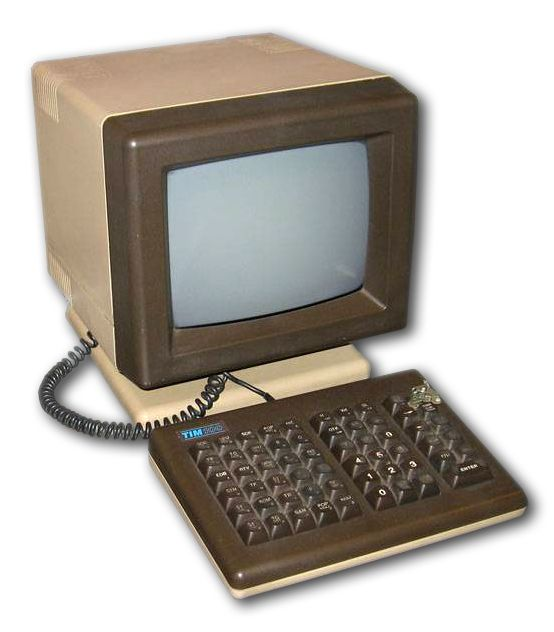
TIM-100 workstation

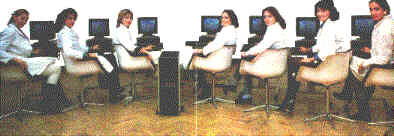
TIM-100 system

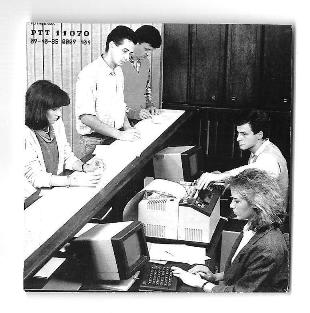
TIM-100 PTT teller workstation,1985

The TIM-100 was a PTT teller microcomputer developed by Mihajlo Pupin Institute (Serbia) in 1985, part of the TIM series of microcomputers.

It first appeared in Belgrade post offices in 1985. Around 1,000 TIM-100 computer systems were produced for Serbian PTT.

The machine was based on the Intel 8086 microprocessor types 8086 and VLSI circuits and had a real-time multi-user and multitasking operating systems (NRT and TRANOS, developed by PTT office).

== Development ==
The TIM system was developed based on the development on application of microprocessors and VLSI circuits and the rapid digitization that was encompassing Yugoslavia.

The primary idea was to unify not only the development of PC computers but also the production, testing, marketing, sales, equipment maintenance, and support for end-user applications. Thus, at the Mihajlo Pupin Institute around 10 models of the TIM system were developed between 1983 and 1990. These ranged from simpler PC computers like TIM-100 and TIM-011 to complex systems like TIM-600. The development team was led by Dr. Dragoljub Milicevic and Dr. Dusan Starcevic.

All computers were manufactured by Energoprojekt Energodata, with a total of more than 5,000 TIM computer systems produced. They successfully operated in various sectors such as postal services, banks, the military, government, scientific and educational institutions, as well as in the energy, water, industry, and transportation sectors.

== Technical details ==
The TIM-100 was a multi-user, multi-process microcomputer primarily designed for as a PTT teller.

The hardware was based on Intel 8086 microprocessors with standard functional modules of the TIM series. The motherboard was made using VLSI technology, allowing for up to 8 MB of RAM. External memory was in the form of 5.25 or 3.5-inch floppy disks.

Software consisted of several programs and systems, including the TIMOS and TRANOS operating systems, software packages for computer graphics, support for local networks (TIMNET), diagnostic programs, and various user applications for counter operations.

== See also ==
- Mihajlo Pupin Institute
- History of computer hardware in the SFRY
- Microcomputers
