= CER-10 =

Yugoslav computer

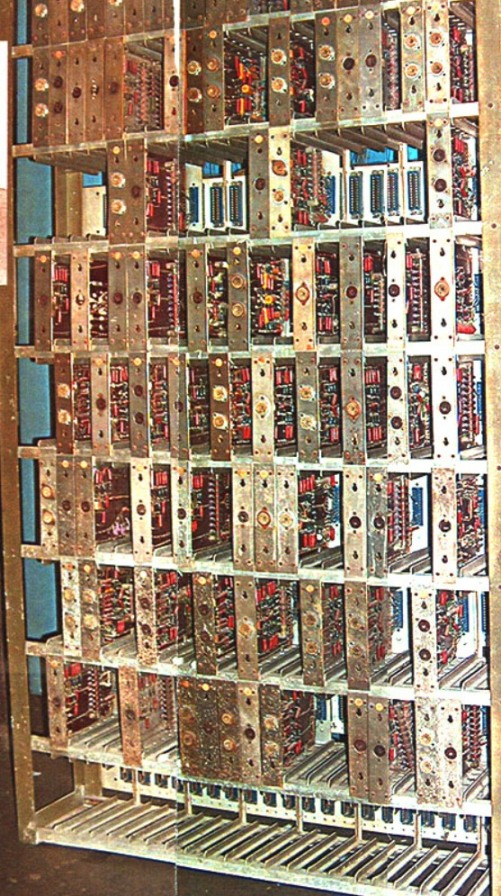
CER-10 computer (CPU inside), displayed at the Museum of Science and Technology, Belgrade

CER model 10 was a vacuum tube, transistor and electronic relay based computer developed at IBK-Vinča and the Mihajlo Pupin Institute (Belgrade) in 1960. It was the first digital computer developed in SFR Yugoslavia, and in Southern Europe.

CER-10 was designed by Tihomir Aleksić and his associates (Rajko Tomović, Vukašin Masnikosa, Ahmed Mandžić, Dušan Hristović, Petar Vrbavac and Milojko Marić) and was developed over four years. The team included 10 engineers and 10 technicians, as well as many others. After initial prototype testing at Vinča and a redesign at the M. Pupin Institute, it was fully deployed at the Tanjug Agency building and worked there for the SKNE from 1961 and the Yugoslav government's SIV, from 1963 to 1967.

The first CER-10 system was located at the SKNE (Federal secretary of internal affairs) building in 1961, which would later belong to Tanjug. The M. Pupin Institute donated the computer's case and some parts of the CER-10 along with its documentation to the Museum of Science and Technology in Belgrade in March 2006, where the computer's CPU is now displayed.

== Specifications ==
- 1750 vacuum tubes
- 1500 transistors
- 14000 Germanium diodes
- Magnetic core primary memory: 4096 of 30-bit words
- Secondary memory: punched tape
- Capable of performing min. 1600 additions per second

== Gallery ==
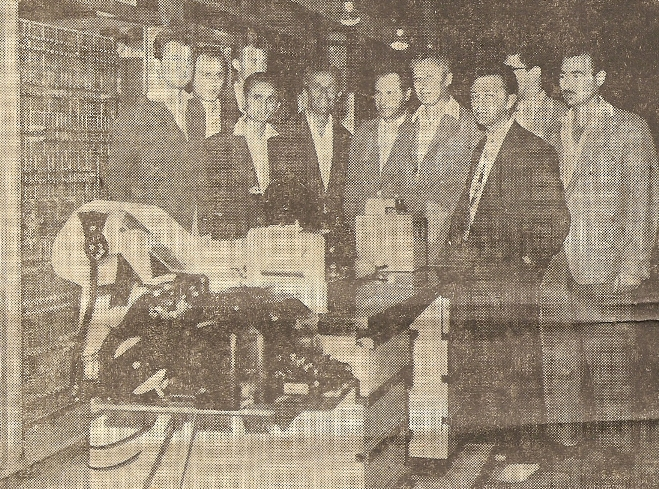
CER-10 designers: Rajko Tomovic, Tihomir Aleksic, et al.

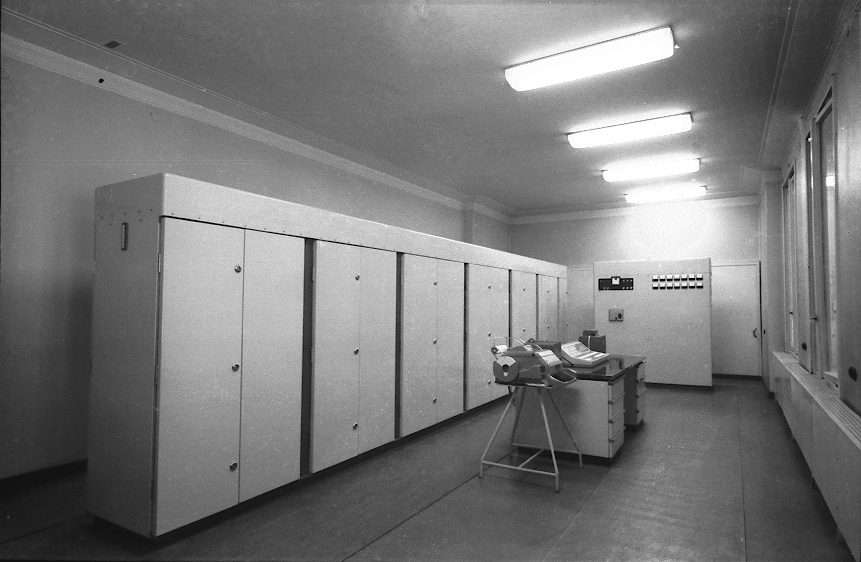
CER-10 at the Tanjug building, Belgrade 1963

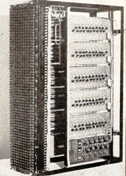
Statistical unit of the CER-10 computer.

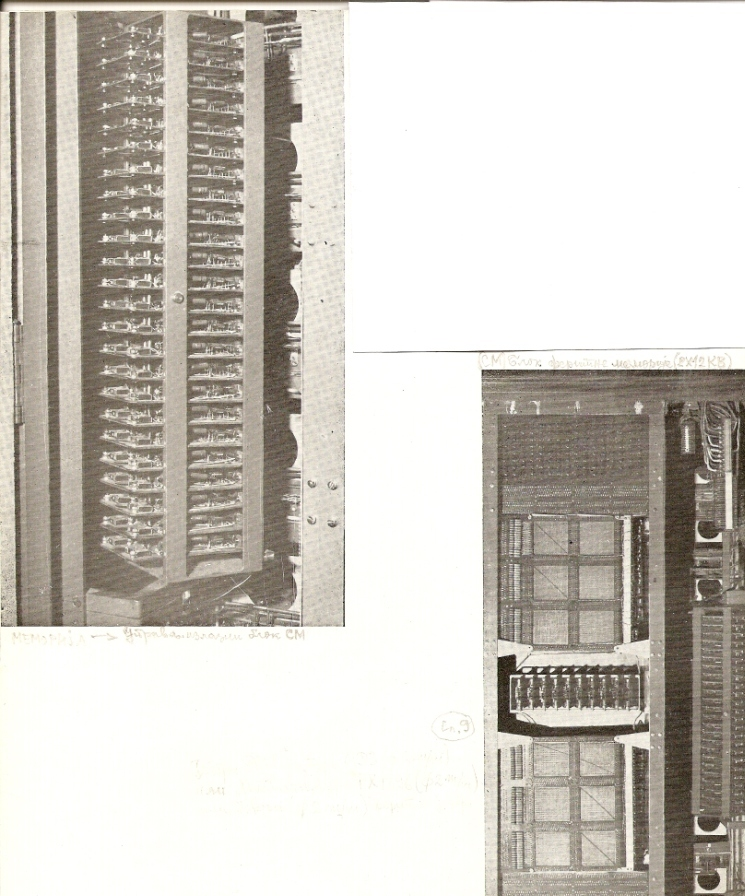
Core memory subsystems of the CER-10.

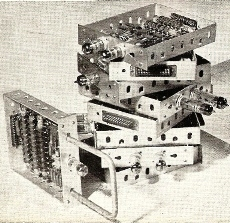
Logical units of the CPU.

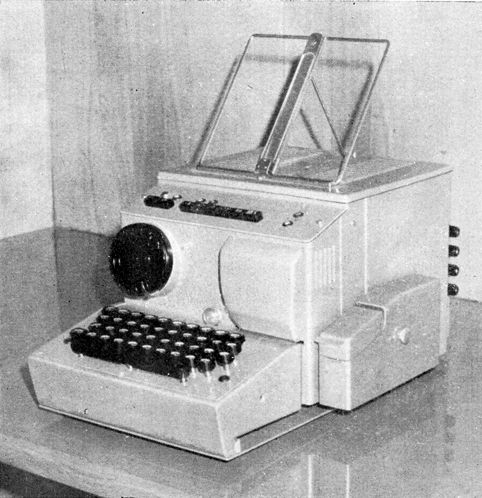
CER teletype

== See also ==
- CER Computers
- Mihajlo Pupin Institute
- History of computer hardware in the SFRY
- List of vacuum tube computers
- Rajko Tomović
