= Vuk (computer) =

Vuk (pronounced [ʋûːk]) is a computer prototype designed by a group of students from Leskovac in SFRY (now Serbia). It was supposed to be a multipurpose educational computer. The development started in 1984 and in 1988 about ten prototypes were produced. Although the design received awards, the Yugoslav industry was not interested, so the computer never reached the production phase.

== Specifications ==
- CPU: MC68000 running at 8 MHz
- ROM: 128 KB (text editor, command interpreter, Pascal compiler, and assembler)
- Primary memory: 1 Mb (expandable up to 14 Mb)
- Secondary storage: floppy drive 800kb (5.25’’ or 3.5’’), hard disk
- Display: 40 column mode (320x256, 16 colors) and 80 column mode (640x256, 4 colors)
- Sound: beeper
- I/O ports: keyboard connector, composite and RF video, RS-232, Centronics, Game port and expansion bus connector
