= ET-188 =

Computer made by Yugoslav company Novkabel from Novi Sad in 1980s

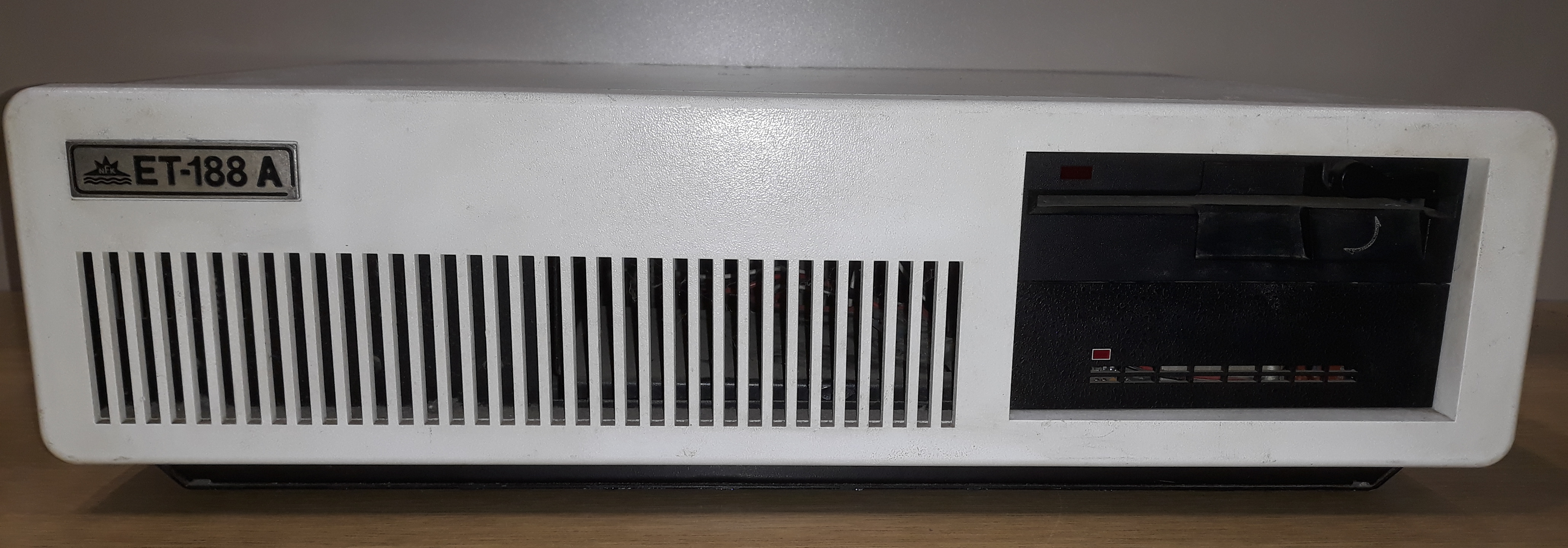
- Novkabel ET-188A
- Manufacturer: Novkabel
- Type: Personal Computer
- Released: 1985; 41 years ago
- Operating system: MS-DOS 3.20
- CPU: Intel 80188 @ 8 MHz
- Memory: 256 KB (ET-188) or 512 KB (ET-188A), expandable to 640 K
- Storage: 22MB Tandon hard disc
- Removable storage: 2 x 5.25’’ 360KB floppy drive or 5.25’’ 360KB floppy drive
- Display: DE9 RGB output
- Graphics: Hercules or CGA compatible adapter
- Sound: Beeper
- Connectivity: RS-232, parallel port
- Backward compatibility: IBM PC XT compatible

ET-188 was an IBM PC XT compatible computer made by the Yugoslav company Novkabel (Novosadska fabrika kabela - Novi Sad Cable Factory) from Novi Sad (now Serbia) in the 1980s.

Novkabel already had experience in developing computer systems (ERA 20, ERA 60 and others) which was used to make ET-188 as an original design, compatible with IBM PC XT.

To save space and to lower the cost, ET-188 used 8 MHz Intel 80188 CPU, with integrated timer, DMA and interrupt controller. This also made it faster than the original XT. ET-188 was offered to the public in 1985 and advertised in the Yugoslav computer press.

An improved ET-188A model was in May 1986 presented to the public at the Belgrade International Fair of Technique and Technical Advancements with more RAM and a new redesigned case. Among other things, ET-188A was used for education in classrooms throughout Vojvodina province.

== Technical specifications ==
- CPU: Intel 80188 running at 8 MHz
- ROM: 8 KB custom made BIOS
- RAM: 256KB (ET-188) or 512 KB (ET-188A), expandable up to 640 KB
- Operating system: MS-DOS 3.20
- Secondary storage: 2 x 5.25’’ 360KB floppy drive or 5.25’’ 360KB floppy drive + 22MB Tandon hard disk
- Display: CGA or Hercules compatible adapter
- Sound: beeper
- I/O ports: DE9 video output, RS-232, parallel port, keyboard
