= Lira 512 =

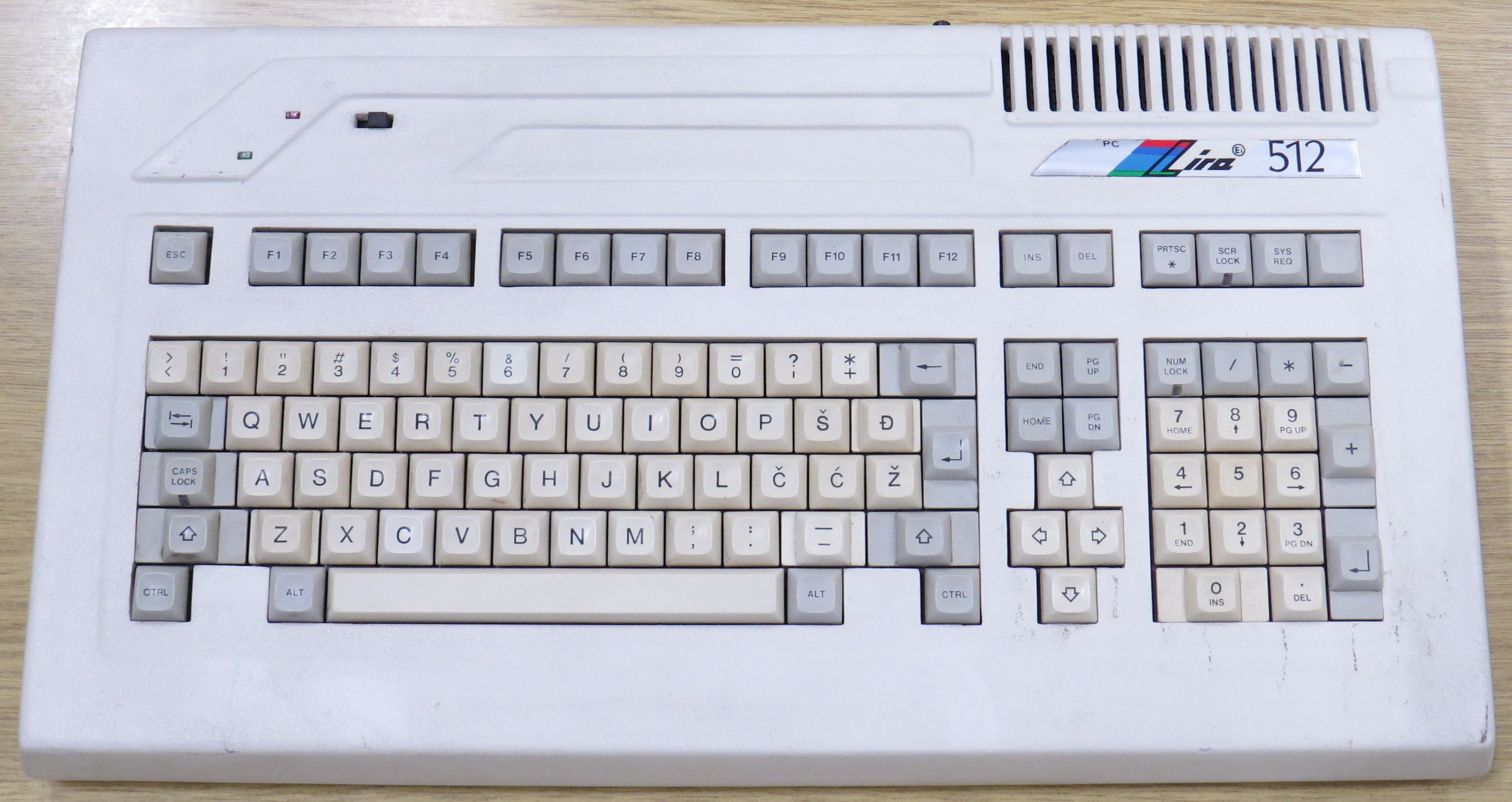
- Manufacturer: EI Niš
- Type: Personal Computer
- Released: 1988; 38 years ago
- Operating system: MS-DOS 3.21
- CPU: Intel 8088 @ 4.77 or 10 MHz
- Memory: 512 KB (expandable to 640 KB)
- Storage: 3 1/2-inch floppy disk drive
- Display: composite video, RF and DE9 RGB output
- Graphics: Hercules and CGA compatible adapter
- Sound: Beeper
- Connectivity: RS-232, parallel port
- Power: 40W
- Backward compatibility: IBM PC XT compatible
- Successor: Lira XT Tower, Lira AT, Lira 386

Lira 512 (also known as Lira XT) was an IBM PC XT compatible computer made by the Yugoslav (now Serbian) company EI Niš in the late 1980s.

It was first presented to the public in April 1988 at the “Kompjuter ‘88” computer show in Belgrade. Soon after that, Lira 512 was also presented in Yugoslav computer press. The main purpose of Lira 512 was to be used in computer classrooms.

What separates Lira 512 from most of the other XT compatibles is that keyboard is included just above in the same case (together with the 3.5’’ floppy drive), which made it similar in appearance to the original Atari ST or the Amiga 500.

== Specifications ==
Lira 512 has the following technical specifications:

- CPU: Intel 8088 running at 4.77 MHz or 10 MHz (turbo)
- ROM: 8 KB Award BIOS, expandable to 32KB
- RAM: 512 KB (expandable up to 640 KB)
- Operating system: MS DOS 3.21
- Secondary storage: 3.5’’ Panasonic 720KB floppy drive
- Display: two display adapters (only one can be used at a time)
  - Hercules compatible adapter (monochrome 80 × 25 text or graphic 720 × 348)
  - CGA compatible adapter (color text 40 × 25, 80 × 25 or graphic 320 × 200, 640 × 200)
- Sound: beeper
- I/O ports: composite, RF and DE9 RGB video output, RS-232 (DB25 male + DE9 male connector reserved for the mouse), parallel port (DB25 female connector), external floppy connector, DA15 PC joystick female connector, light pen and expansion connector
- Power supply 40W

Lira has two display adapters (monochrome Hercules compatible and color CGA compatible), where the active video adapter is chosen by the back-panel switch. A 40W power adapter is also installed in the same case.

== Image gallery ==
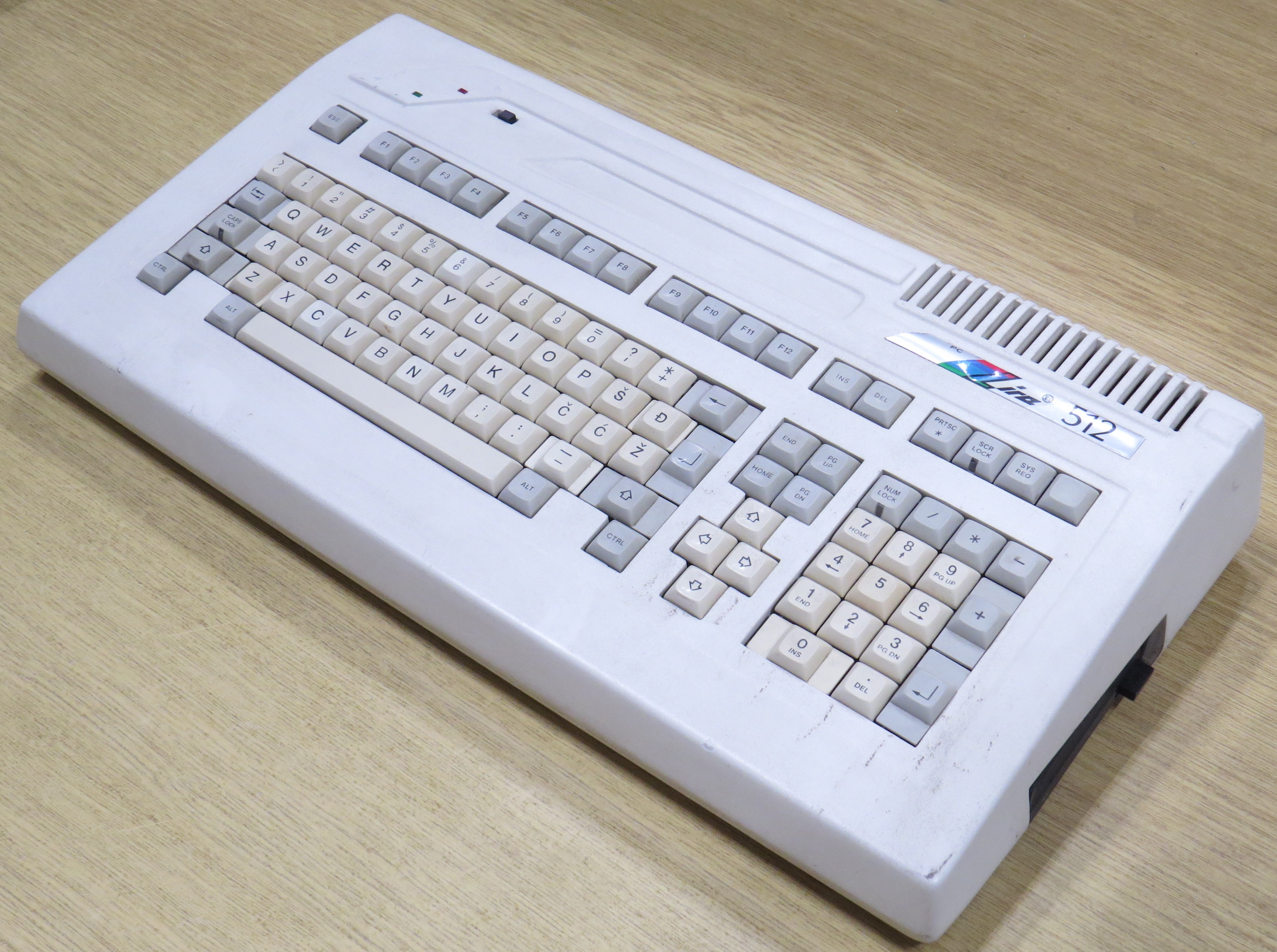
Lira 512, sideways

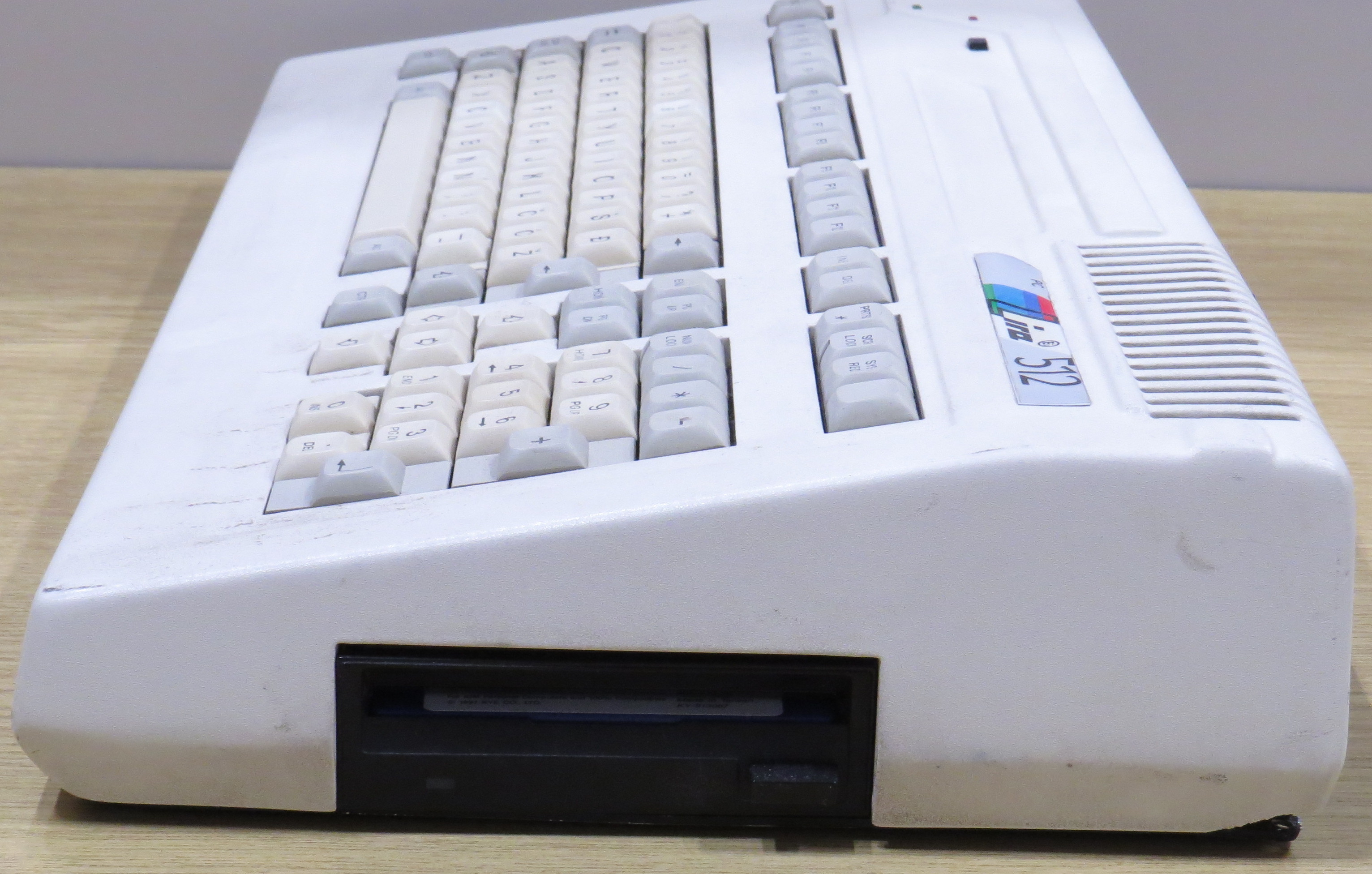
Lira 512, floppy drive

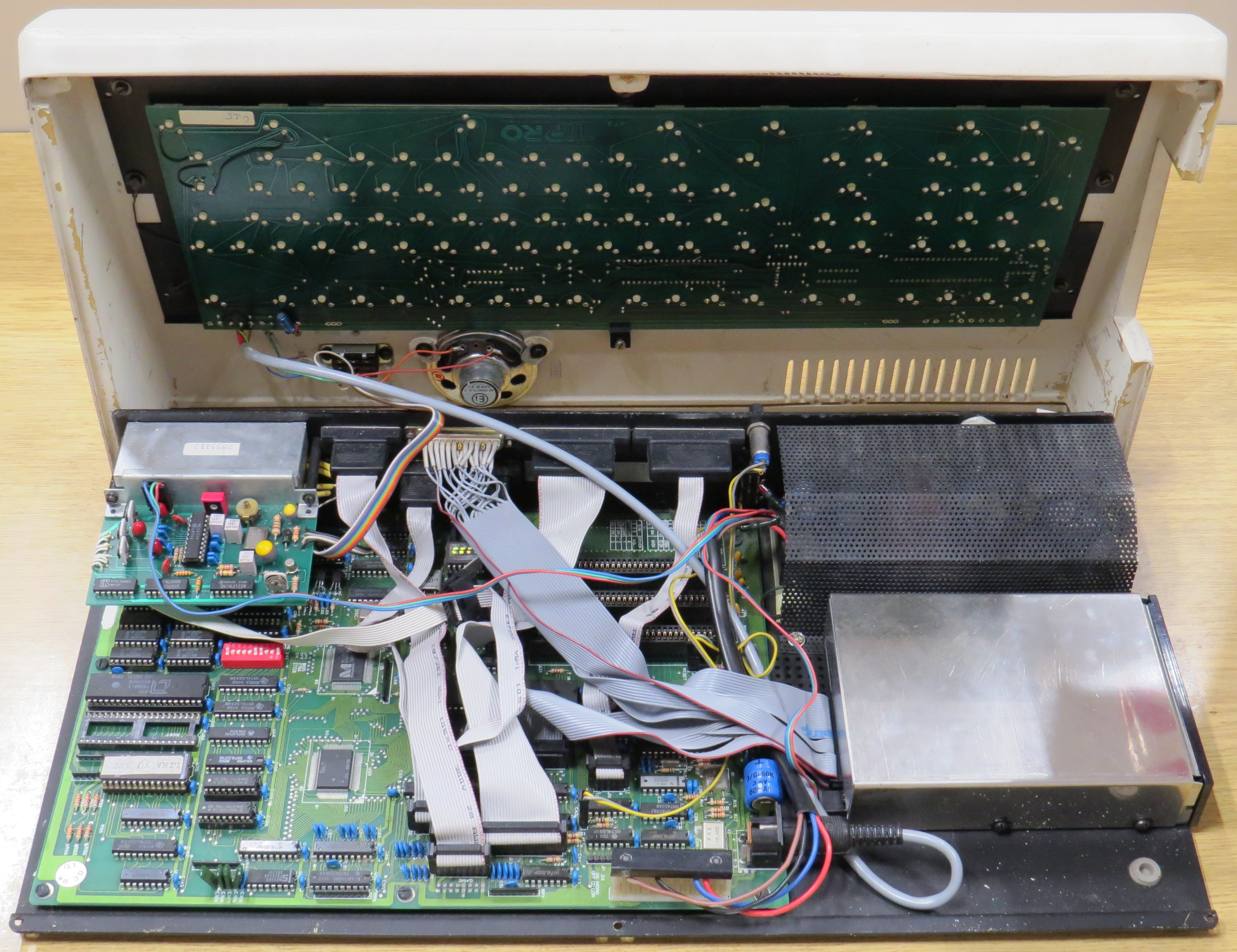
Lira 512 inside

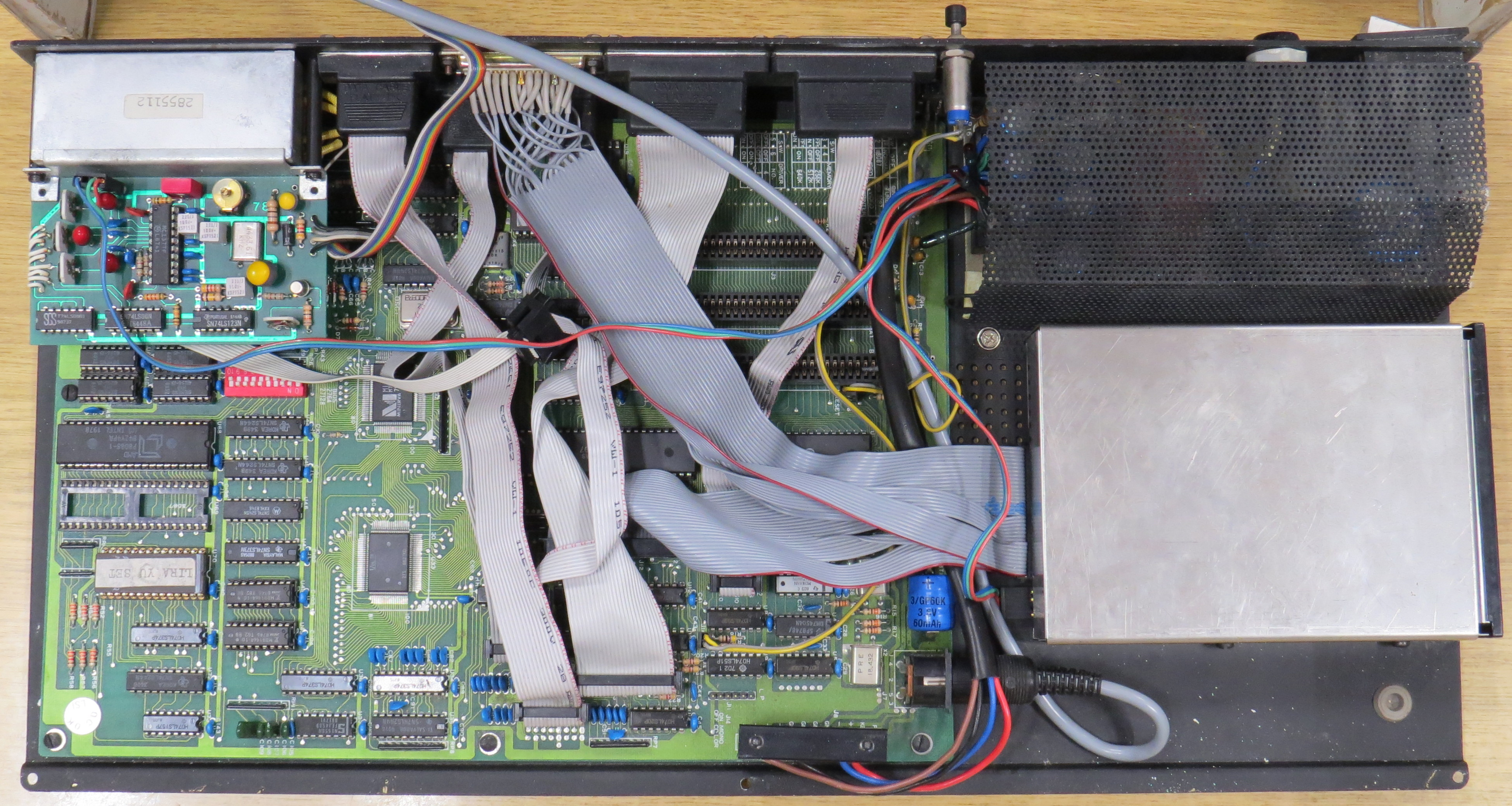
Lira 512 motherboard

== Other Lira models ==
=== Lira XT Tower ===
Lira XT Tower was released about a year after the original Lira 512, because it was realized that the compact case limited hardware expansion. To address this issue, especially to allow for the installation of a hard disk, the case was changed to a slimline tower.

=== Lira AT ===
The new Lira AT was released at about the same time as the Lira XT Tower, with a similar looking slimline tower case. Lira AT was a IBM PC AT compatible, equipped with a 80286 CPU, 1MB of RAM, a EGA compatible video adapter, two 3.5" floppy drives and a 40MB hard disk. Serial production of this model started in December 1989.

=== Lira 386 ===
The Lira 386, based on a 80386 CPU, was ready for production by 1990.
