= Hobby ZR-84 =

1984 home computer

Hobby ZR-84 was an educational and home computer developed by MICROSYS Beočin in SFRY (now Serbia) in 1984.

== Specifications ==
- CPU: Z80A running at 4 MHz
- ROM: 12 KB BASIC
- Primary memory: 16 KB (expandable up to 48 KB)
- Secondary storage: cassette tape, floppy drive
- Display: text mode 16 lines with 64 characters each; low-res graphics mode 128x48
- Sound: separate board
- I/O ports: composite and RF video, cassette tape storage, and expansion connector
