= Legal industry by country =

The legal industry refers to the aggregation and integration of sectors within the economic system that provide legal goods and services. The global legal industry is fast-growing: in 2015, it was valued at US$786 billion, US$886 billion by 2018 and is expected to exceed US$1 trillion by 2021. The United States and Europe dominate the legal industry, with the former accounting for more than half of the global market revenue. Meanwhile, Europe accounts for more than a quarter of revenue. Legal services in the Asia-Pacific region continues to grow, with total revenues of $103.3 billion in 2018.

== Background ==
=== Types of services ===
The legal industry carries out the following services amongst others:

- The legal representation of one party's interest against another, whether or not before courts or judicial bodies by, or under supervision of, members of the Bar
  - Legal advice and representation in civil cases
  - Legal advice and representation in criminal cases
  - Legal advice and representation on behalf of the government
- General counselling, advising and/or preparation of the following legal documents:
  - Articles of incorporation, partnership agreements or documents in connection with company formation
  - Patents and copyrights
  - Preparation of deeds, wills and trusts
- Other activities of notaries public, civil law notaries, bailiffs, arbitrators, examiners and referees
- Administration and operation of civil and criminal law courts, military tribunals and the judicial system
- Rendering of judgments and interpretations of the law
- Arbitration of civil actions.

=== Types of stakeholders ===
Traditionally, major stakeholders in the legal industry include lawyers, judicial systems and law schools. However, in recent years, the industry has expanded to include alternative legal service providers (ALSPs), which provide high demand legal services that were traditionally provided by law firms. These range from small legal tech start-ups to the Big Four accounting firms that offer legal managed services to their clients. Allied legal professionals in roles like knowledge management, learning and professional development, legal project management, legal process engineering and legal technologists are also an important part of facilitating the delivery of legal products and services. ALSPs provide many legal services such as document review, contract management, litigation support, e-Discovery and contract lawyers and staffing. ALSPs are widely utilised to manage various legal services. Some law firms may also hire ALSPs to provide additional services for their corporate clients, whereas corporates may work closely with ALSPs to provide specialised legal support for their in-house legal teams.

=== Types of technologies ===
Legal technologies are also beginning to be pervasively adopted to improve the quality, efficiency and cost-effectiveness of legal services and their delivery. Machine learning in legal research and document review, distributed ledger technologies in smart contracts, advanced statistical modelling for legal analytics of big data, and the digitalisation of court processes are popular areas for legal technology adoption and innovation.

=== Types of professional development ===
In addition to a law degree and professional certification to practice as a lawyer, a number of key legal systems require some form of continuing education. This is necessary as the pace of change is accelerating and it is necessary for legal professionals and allied legal professionals to keep up-to-date In order to remain relevant and effective. There is significant work underway in the US, UK and Singapore to articulate the types of future-focused competencies needed by different legal industry roles. Models of competence include the DELTA Model, the SRA competence statement and the Legal Industry Framework for Training and Education (LIFTED).

== Impact of COVID-19 ==
Indeed, the 2020 coronavirus pandemic (aka COVID-19) affected global legal services with the temporary shutdown of offices, pay cuts, layoffs, and deals paused indefinitely. To stem losses, global law firms quickly instituted pay cuts for partners and associates, furloughed staff, suspended summer associate programs and delayed first-year associate classes. At the same time, clients postponed or scrapped deals and asked to renegotiate existing payment plans with law firms. As a result, law firms and the legal industry experienced extreme financial distress in the first three quarters of 2020.

During the pandemic, few legal departments were fortunate to experience a steady flow of business. For example, restructuring and bankruptcy departments experienced a surge in work in the US as corporates looked to survive the crisis and others looked to mitigate losses.

On the other hand, during the first two quarters of 2020, the total number of global M&A deals continued to fall with cancelled deals and corporate financial distress. A reprieve came during the third quarter of 2020 when the market rebounded with the value of the global M&A market deals doubled to $891 billion, with those disclosed values of US$5 billion or more skyrocketed (356%) quarter over quarter. However, despite a positive third quarter in 2020, the number of M&A deals have fallen from (5,106) in 2019 valued at US$2.58 trillion to (3,494) in 2020 valued at US$1.86 trillion.

Law firms that embraced technology early on communicated easily with their clients and participated in multi-jurisdictional transactions. Research shows that lawyers adopted technology at the fastest rate during the pandemic than pre-Covid times. According to Clio, (85%) firms used software to manage their practice and (79%) relied on cloud technology to store firm data. During the pandemic, (83%) of firms met with clients virtually; (73%) allowed clients to pay invoice electronically and (62%) permitted clients to share and sign documents electronically securely.

While most firms lost revenue in Asia, some firms experienced an increase in restructuring deals and discussions regarding distressed acquisitions. In addition, firms in Asia reported that their regulatory teams, as well as their litigation teams, were in high demand, although the total number of M&A deals decreased (20%) from 2019 to $381.2 billion. In Hong Kong, the Chinese corporate team took on five IPOs in September 2020 with another eight deals ready to go. Asian law firms also experienced an uptick in regulatory investigations and litigation related to force majeure and business interruption.

== Legal industry insights by country ==
=== Australia ===
The legal services market in Australia saw a surge in demand from 2018 to the end of 2019. The Australian legal services market constitutes a mature market valued currently at US$21bn. From 2009 to 2015, the Australian legal services market experienced a gradual decline, moving from overall demand at (6%) in 2009 to overall demand at (-3%) in 2015. However, in 2018, the Australian legal services market saw a surge in demand, with an average increase of (7.8%). Demand has remained strong in 2019 and 2020, although traditional Australian law firms faced increased competition from ALSPs, and NewLaw firms.

The legal services market in Australia is projected to show growth over the next five years. Despite an (8.1%) decline in revenue for legal services in 2019–2020, legal services revenue are expected to grow by (1.2%) from 2020 to 2021. Demand from the following sectors will support the continued growth of the legal services market in Australia: demand from property operators and developers and banking, finance and insurance firms.

=== Brazil ===
Brazil has the largest economy in Latin America. As of 4 October 2021, the population of Brazil was over 214 million. In 2021, Brazil's GDP reached about US$1.49 trillion – a strong measure of economic strength.

The legal system in Brazil is a hybrid, originating from Portuguese law and then evolving to its own autonomous legal institutions. Brazil operates on a civil law system based on European civil codes such as Portugal, France, and Germany, which elevates statutes over judicial precedent.

Brazil's economy opened up to the global market in the 1990s, which had a significant impact on Brazil's legal services market, with the most significant impact on the corporate sector. With an influx of both domestic and foreign legal work, demand for corporate services grew, which led to new laws governing corporate activity and created demand from corporates navigating the new legal environment.

In 2014, Brazil enacted the Clean Companies Act. The Clean Companies Act is an anti-bribery law imposing liability on companies and promoting compliance programs and cooperation with authorities. The Clean Company Act applies to business organisations in Brazil, whether local or foreign and any Brazilian foundations or associations. The Clean Companies Act is similar to the U.S. Foreign Corrupt Practices Act ("FCPA") and the U.K. Bribery Act 2010 ("Bribery Act"), which looks to the enforcement of bribery offences.

In September 2019, the Brazilian government enacted the "Law of Economic Freedom" to encourage investment in and the development of business in Brazil. The guiding principles include the presumption of freedom in doing business, the presumption of good faith of individuals, minimal intervention of the state on doing business, and the recognition that individuals are vulnerable before the state.

On August 26, 2021, The New Business Environment Law was passed. The New Business Environment Law helped Brazil advance 20 positions in the World Bank's Doing Business ranking and seeks to simplify the opening and operation of companies in Brazil. Some of the measures include automatic approval for businesses in medium risk activities, changes in governance rules, ease of foreign trade, etc.

=== Canada ===
In 2020, there were over 130,000 lawyers practising in Canada. In 2019, of 61 "stand-out" Canadian lawyers, (71%) of private practice lawyers preferred to work at a local Canadian law firm, rather than an international firm. From 2018 to 2019, the majority of corporates identified that they have international legal needs with about (36-37%) of legal spend allocated for international spending. While corporate clients explored the use of ALSPs, (85%) of legal spend is still with traditional law firms and litigation (36%) is the largest legal spend of corporates.

In 2019, Canadian in-house teams in sourced more and over 60% of companies expected to decrease external legal spend.

=== Egypt ===
Egypt, historically regarded as one of the cradles of civilization, has experienced dynamic changes in its legal sector over the decades. As of 24 October 2023, the population of Egypt surpassed 100 million, with an economy that remains one of the most diverse in the Middle East and North Africa. Stemming from its rich history and influenced by various global legal systems, Egypt's legal framework evolved predominantly from civil law traditions, borrowing elements from French, Roman, and Islamic law.

With the liberalization of its economy in the late 20th century, Egypt witnessed a surge in both domestic and international trade. This economic transition catalyzed a notable transformation in Egypt's legal services market, especially impacting the corporate sector. The influx of domestic and foreign legal work necessitated refined corporate service offerings, spurring the development of new laws governing corporate activities and generating demand from businesses navigating this evolving legal landscape.

In recent years, Egypt has made significant strides in improving its business environment. Laws aiming to boost foreign investments and streamline business operations have been introduced, drawing inspiration from global best practices. Notably, the Investment Law of 2017, enacted to attract and assure foreign investors, offers various incentives and establishes a more transparent system for investment in the country.

Furthermore, in alignment with global anti-bribery and corruption norms, Egypt has been active in reinforcing its legal provisions to ensure compliance, transparency, and the promotion of ethical business practices.

Recently, efforts to simplify business procedures and enhance the entrepreneurial ecosystem have been realized through various reforms. These reforms aim to position Egypt more favorably on the global stage, emphasizing the country's commitment to fostering a conducive environment for both local and international businesses.

=== India ===
India's legal services market is valued at over US$1.3 billion. The legal services market in India remains strong, with the legal market surpassing a value of US$1.3 billion in 2018, as a result of foreign investment and rising demand from local clients. Of this, around US$400 million is attributed to 'contentious legal work', including complex litigations and arbitrations.

India's legal profession adapts to technological change and new government policies. The legal profession in India is in the midst of significant transformation spurred by evolving client demands, automation and technological innovation and changing government policies (especially during COVID-19). While some law firms recognised the importance of embracing technology much before the pandemic, traditional law practices are gradually adjusting to the new norm.

=== Indonesia ===
Indonesia is the most populous Southeast Asian country. Indonesia's population is over 273,523,615. In addition to being Southeast Asia's largest market, Indonesia is the world's 10th largest economy in terms of purchasing power parity.

Legal services are defined under Law No. 18 of 2003 on Advocates. Legal services refer to services provided by an Advocate in the form of providing legal advice, legal assistance, implementing power of attorney, providing representation, and defending and carrying out other legal actions on behalf of a client.

Indonesia is a civil law jurisdiction that incorporates customary and Roman-Dutch law. Indonesia maintains a civil law legal system combined with customary law, which differentiates it from other jurisdictions in the region. Indonesia also recognises the religious legal system (Sharia, Islamic law), which is implemented in the Aceh province.

Legal start-ups gain traction in Indonesia. While legal services from traditional law firms remain in demand, Indonesia has seen the emergence of legal start-ups. These legal start-ups provide products and services related to innovative technology-based services to improve services in terms of legality, including digital signatures, legal consulting marketplaces, and legal contract creation.

The majority of legal services focus primarily on domestic legal work. The key buyers of legal services are companies seeking to invest or that are currently investing in Indonesia. As of the 3rd quarter of 2020, the key sectors for investment in Indonesia were Transportation and Telecommunication; Metal and Equipment Industry; Electricity, Gas and Water; Housing and Estate; and Chemical and Pharmaceutical Industry.

As Southeast Asia's largest economy, Indonesia has encountered growth through its natural resources of gas, coal and precious metals. Indeed, the Metal and Equipment Industry and Electricity, Gas, and Water continue to be among Indonesia's key sectors for investment.

Legal services providers include in-house lawyers, legal counsel, practising lawyers and legal consultants. Indonesia's supply-side of legal services generally comprises traditional law firms, legal professionals (i.e. licensed advocates, arbitrator, mediator, notary) and in-house legal counsel.

Meanwhile, on the demand side, the stakeholders of legal services include retail clients, corporations, foreign investors, government institutions, and state-owned enterprises, who require legal services from law firms and other external legal professionals in both transactional matters and dispute resolution.

The use of technology has increased in the legal service market. In recent years, technology has played an important role as the government has started to move some of its public services online. The enactment of regulations relating to online processing of licenses and certificates is aimed to support the ease of doing business in the jurisdiction.

=== Malaysia ===
In Malaysia, legal services can be segmented into two sectors - public practice or private practice. Public practice lawyers are administered by the Judicial and Legal Service Commission and are transferable within the Attorney General's Chambers or can be seconded to any of the State Government as legal advisers. There is no division of legal services in private practice. Law firms provide a wide range of legal services such as litigation, conveyancing, corporate advisory and intellectual property. Specialised boutique law firms advise on niche areas like taxation, shipping law and competition law.

Local law firms control the legal services market in Malaysia. Corporate work is dominated by large full-service law firms and mid-sized boutique corporate law firms.

In 2015, law firms mainly focused on smaller corporate clients. In 2015, about (95%) of Malaysian law firms focused on the retail market, specifically individual clients or SME's and only about (5%) focused on large corporations.

Section 17A of MACC Act 2009 (Amendment 2018) promotes good corporate governance. As a result of the corruption charges filed against the former Prime Minister, amendments were made to the Malaysian Anti-corruption Commission (MACC) Act 2009 (Amendment 2018). The purpose of the MACC is to investigate and prevent any form of corruption and abuse of power. The MACC may hold commercial organisations liable if their employees or associates are involved in corruption crimes.

International law firms may operate in Malaysia. Under the Legal Professional (Amendment) Act, Part IVA, a foreign law firm wanting to do business in Malaysia has two options: (a) operate as an International Partnership with a Malaysia law firm or (b) operate as a Qualified Foreign Law Firm ("QFLF").

According to the Malaysian Bar report of 2020, the largest area of practice is no longer corporate work. As of 2020, the largest practice areas for Malaysian law firms are conveyancing and civil litigation.

Hiring of legal professionals in 2021 will most likely remain conservative and limited to certain industries. Industries such as goods and services, e-commerce and digital banking are expected to remain active in 2021. Legal professionals involved in technology and digital areas, and in risk and compliance may also be in high demand.

=== People's Republic of China ===
The rapid growth of China's economy has increased the demand for legal services. China has a significant legal market, and the legal needs in China have significantly increased with the rapid growth of China's economy. According to the World Bank, China's GDP has increased exponentially since the 1980s, from US$191 billion to US$14 trillion in 2019.

As of 2019, the legal industry has generated revenue exceeding 155.8 billion yuan (US$24 billion). China's legal service industry continues to grow, with 2019 showing an increase of (29.8%) revenue from the previous year.

According to the National Bureau of Statistics, the GDP (excluding Hong Kong, Macau and Taiwan) exceeded RMB 100 trillion (US$15.42 trillion) threshold as it posted a (2.3%) year-on-year expansion to RMB 101.5986 trillion in 2020.

China's demand for legal services continues to grow as the demand for cross-border transactions increases. From 2014 to 2019, legal demand from large Chinese organizations engaged in cross-border transactions grew from (81%) to (93%). The majority of Chinese companies need legal advice in SAR Hong Kong, the US and Europe. This trend, especially its need in Europe, is perhaps unsurprising since it parallels broader economic trends of China's increased investment in foreign countries (for example, through the Belt and Road strategy).

Global multinationals doing business in China increase the demand for legal services. Global multinationals doing business in China increased their need for legal services with, (62%) of global multinationals having legal needs in China. In 2014, the demand for corporate work was high, whereas, in 2019, regulatory and banking and finance overtook corporate as the primary area of legal need. This shift in demand to regulatory and banking and finance law commenced in December 2019, when the China Banking and Insurance Regulatory Commission granted foreign banks greater leeway in establishing subsidiaries and branches in China.

State-owned Enterprises or State-owned Investments (SOEs) in China contribute to both the domestic and international market. In 2019, SOEs contributed to around (30%) of the country's GDP. SOEs consist of domestic companies such as memory-chip factories, coal and electricity groups, and Belt & Road Initiative (BRI) SOEs involved in projects outside China. As SOEs do not generally enjoy sovereign immunity, and because they do need legal advice on changing regulations, they invest more resources into legal services.

Arbitration is commonly used to settle cross-border disputes in China. Due to the BRI, companies utilise arbitration as a means to resolve disputes. In 2018, the Chinese arbitration commission handled over (540,000) cases, increasing (127%) from 2017. In 2019, China International Economic and Trade Arbitration Commission (CIETAC) administered 617 foreign-related cases, increasing from 2018. The CIETAC data shows that commercial dispute resolution cases, especially cross-border cases, increased in the first half of 2020 in volume and value. By July 2020, the total value of cases that CIETAC handled exceeded 100 billion, almost equal to the number of the entire year of 2019. Among these cases, international trade, M&A, equity transfer, and construction payments played a significant role.

=== Hong Kong (SAR) ===
Hong Kong serves as a global financial and legal centre in Asia. Hong Kong is uniquely situated in Asia under a "One Country, Two Systems" principle and is known for its global trade, finance and business expertise in banking and finance, shipping and maritime, construction, intellectual property and information technology.

Hong Kong legal services are unique in their ability to attract international legal work. Although the bulk of law firms in Hong Kong are dealing with domestic legal work, the status of Hong Kong as the Asian legal hub has been largely shaped by international legal work. Indeed, foreign law firms and foreign legal professionals from China, the UK and the US participate in a competitive legal market.

Hong Kong maintains its reputation as a go-to arbitration hub in Asia. In cross-border transactions, parties often choose Hong Kong based arbitration as the exclusive means to settle potential disputes. As a result, many complicated international disputes are settled in Hong Kong. According to the Hong Kong International Arbitration Centre (HKIAC), in 2020, HKIAC received 318 arbitration cases, the most arbitration cases in ten years. Indeed, international parties arbitrated more matters in Hong Kong, with (72.3%) of all arbitrations submitted to HKIAC in 2020 involving at least one party that was not from Hong Kong and (31.8%) of all arbitrations involving no Hong Kong parties. The total amount in dispute in 2020 was HK$68.8 billion.

Exports of legal services (i.e., the recipients of legal services are based outside of Hong Kong) reached US$386 million in 2018. Corporations in Hong Kong generally utilise legal spend in the following seven countries: the US, UK, and mainland China, in addition to Singapore, Japan, and then India and Australia. Indeed, studies show that (59%) of legal spend is external to Hong Kong and (60%) of law firms expect international spend to increase.

=== Singapore ===
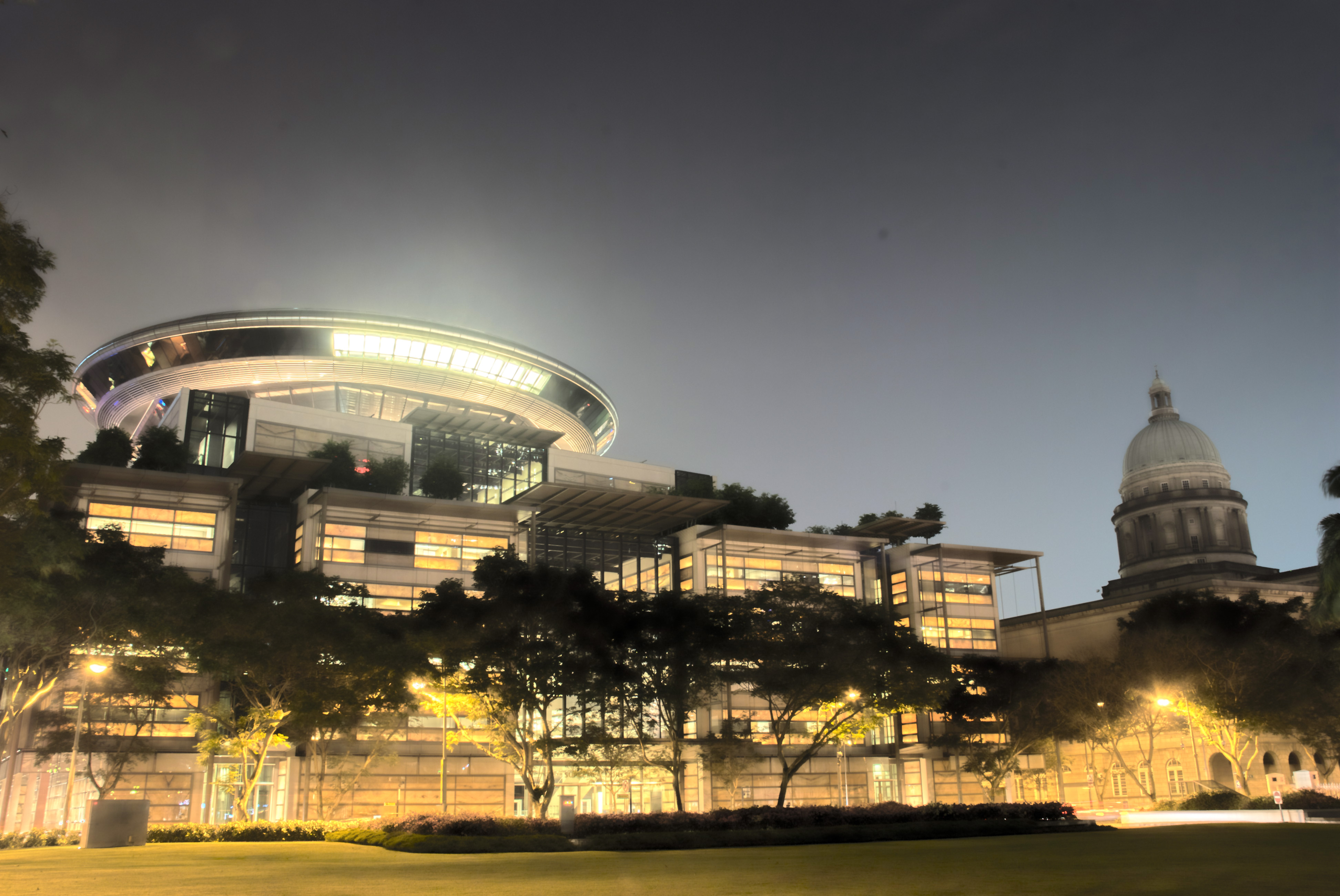
Supreme Court of Singapore at night

Singapore offers the efficiency, integrity and skills of Switzerland and London in the heart of Asia. Singapore's legal services market success is attributed to its (a) geographical advantage, (b) modern, clean and extremely efficient country with excellent infrastructure and world-class communications, and (c) reputable government and courts.

Being one of the world's financial centres, Singapore is home to some of the most business-friendly regulations globally, and the World Bank ranks Singapore second on its ease of doing business index. In terms of corruption, Singapore's government is ranked third out of 180 countries in Transparency International's Corruption Perceptions Index, which means its perceived levels of public sector corruption according to experts, and business people, is very low.

In 2019, the legal industry in Singapore generated SGD2.4 billion in nominal gross value add and employed over 13,000 professionals.

Singapore is regularly acknowledged as a leading dispute resolution hub with the Singapore Convention on Mediation, the Singapore International Arbitration Centre, and the Singapore International Commercial Court. Singapore courts are knowledgeable on international arbitration and are extremely supportive of parties utilising arbitration. In fact, in 2019, Singapore was recognised as an arbitration hub and an innovator in legal technology. In 2020, the Singapore International Arbitration Centre saw its caseload increase to over 1,000 cases, despite the global pandemic with a "record 1,080 cases involving disputes totalling $11.25 billion."

Singapore's Ministry of Law anticipates that the following trends will impact the Singapore legal industry the most from 2020 to 2030: (a) the rise of technology giants (83.3%), (b) trade wars (75%), (c) rise of Asia (62.5%), and (d) the rise of legal industry competition (41.4%).

The majority of corporate legal spending is external to Singapore. Legal spending has increased in Singapore by (44%) because of M&A deals and a need for specialist external counsel. Most of the legal spending is external to Singapore (59%), with a majority of corporations doing business in India, China, Hong Kong and the UK.

Local firms continue to dominate the legal services market but they face increased pressure and competition from international law firms and ALSPs. Currently, Singapore law firms control the legal markets, but as international firms and the big four accounting firms continue to grow and take larger legal roles, there may be a shift in control of the legal services market.

The legal services market in Singapore is both overcrowded and very competitive – the market continues to be divided between domestic and foreign players. As one of the world's financial centres, the key buyers of Singapore's legal services vary from institutional investors to SME start-ups. In 2020, Mishcon de Reya LLP established a Singapore office with an initial focus on private client work for high net-worth families in the region.

In the last three years, Singapore has been rising in prominence as an innovation centre for legal technology. The Singapore Academy of Law launched the Future Law Innovation Programme (FLIP) in 2018, and is known for its thought leadership in the convergence of Asian business laws particularly in the space of data protection and the enforcement of foreign judgments.

=== South Africa ===
Political uncertainty and regulatory reforms have increased the demand for legal services. With new legislation and a changing regulatory framework, corporates seek complex legal advice related to real estate and M&A markets. For example, "[j]udicial inquiries into state capture, widespread corruption, the mismanagement of state-owned entities and potential amendment of the Constitution to allow for the expropriation of land and property without compensation" will result in clients needing guidance and advice on how to navigate the new laws.

Legal services provided by Pan African law firms and African legal networks play an essential role in the legal ecosystem. Pan African law firms are expanding and launching offices throughout the African continent. For example, South African law firm Bowmans maintains nine offices across 8 African countries. Similarly, African legal networks provide Africa-wide legal services to their clients. The African legal networks include groups such as ALN, LEX Africa, and the DLA Africa network. Founded in 1993, LEX Africa was the first Pan-African legal alliance created; it currently has over 600 lawyers and over 20 member countries.

Local law firms face increased competition from global law firms. Continued interest in South Africa by larger global firms is driving internal competition in the market among law firms. In 1995, White & Case was the first international firm to open an office in South Africa.

From 2011 to 2016, large global firms such as Norton Rose Fulbright (2011), Baker McKenzie (2012), Allen & Overy (2016) and DLA Piper (2016) launched local offices in Johannesburg.

South Africa is one of the early beneficiaries of intra-African free trade. The first shipment of goods travelled from Ghana to South Africa on 1 January 2021, marking the start of trading under the African Continental Free Trade Agreement.

The government has focused on boosting investor interest in South Africa's infrastructure, automotive, healthcare and renewable energy sectors. The government continues to encourage investor interest in South Africa's infrastructure, automotive, healthcare and renewable energy sectors. In addition, the government encourages investments in the country's special economic zones (SEZs) to facilitate interest and investments from foreign investors such as the UK, Europe and the US.

The legal sector contributes to +- (0.5% to 1%) to GDP in South Africa. The growth of South Africa's legal sector is based on the economy and business confidence, which increases deal flow and the value of the deal. In 2017, the South African legal sector was estimated to be worth R30bn.

=== United Kingdom ===
The United Kingdom, like other common law jurisdictions, differentiates between barristers, lawyers who plead in court, and solicitors, who do not. The average law firm in the UK is still growing and has strong brand recognition. But the growth of UK law firms is not from an increase in demand, but a result of consolidation, lateral hires and rate hikes.

In 2019, the UK ALSP market showed a 12.9% annual growth rate and the larger ALSPs expect a larger increase in growth at 24%. The rate of corporations using ALSPs has increased from 2017, with more than 30% of corporations utilizing ALSP services for legal tasks. UK large law firms engaged ALSPs as follows: eDiscovery (49%), research (legal / non-legal) (42%), document review / coding (40%) and litigation and investigation support (36%).

In 2007, the UK's Legal Services Act of 2007 established the Alternative Business Structures (ABSs) that allows non-lawyers to hold professional, management or ownership roles in UK law firms. As an ABS, a law firm may hire an accounting professional as a partner of the firm, which was not allowed before the Legal Services Act of 2007. An ABS is not an ALSP, it is a business structure that allows law firms to buy different legal entities, whereas in the UK, law firms can only buy other law firms.

In 2018, of the 9,542 firms registered, there were 718 Alternative Business Structures, an increase from 2017 of 118 Alternative Business Structures.257 The majority of ABSs (71%) operated as limited company structures.

=== United States ===
The American legal market is the largest in the world with cumulative revenues of about US$2 trillion from 2012 to 2018. The industry is expected to grow from US$313.1 billion in 2018 to over US$344 billion in 2023. The three largest practice areas in terms of revenue are government, worker's compensation and trusts.

While the industry is growing, legal regulators are grappling with an environment where the "cost of traditional legal services is going up, access to legal services is going down, the growth rate of law firms is flat, and lawyers serving ordinary people are struggling to earn a living."

The big four accounting firms are making a bigger push into legal services. Most recently, Deloitte launched its US Legal Business Services that will work with in-house legal offices to provide legal tech support to track client contracts, invoices, eDiscovery and other core functions. As of now, the big four are limited in their legal services as the American Bar Association bans attorneys and law firms from sharing "legal fees" with non-lawyers. It also prohibits attorneys and non-lawyers from entering into a partnership "if any of the activities of the partnership consist of the practice of law."

However, Arizona, California and Utah have recently been relaxing their interpretations of these regulations. In 2019, a California state bar task force researching the increase to "access to justice" considered new ethic rules that would allow non-lawyers to invest in law firms and tech companies to provide limited legal services. Indeed, California is taking measures that move the US legal market similar to counties that allow non-lawyers to own legal service providers and non-lawyers to provide certain work.

In Utah, regulatory reforms allow lawyers and non-lawyers to experiment with new business models in a "regulatory sandbox" for a two-year period. The Utah firm Law On Call became the first non-lawyer owned law firm in the United States in 2021. Likewise, in August 2020 the Arizona Supreme Court approved changes to "regulation of the practice of law, including scrapping a rule that bars non-lawyer ownership of law firms." From January 2021, lawyers and non-lawyers in Arizona will be able to own law firms. Moreover, non-lawyers, "legal paraprofessionals" will also be able to provide "limited legal services" after going through a licensing process.
