= CER Computer =

Computer series

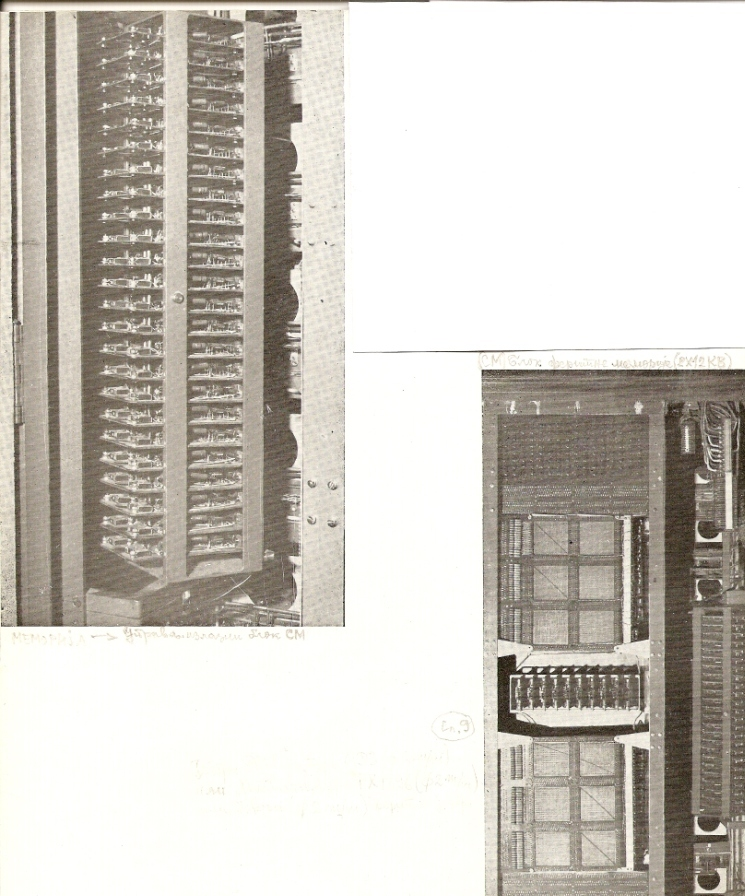
Core memory subsystems of the CER-10 computer at M.Pupin Institute in Belgrade,Serbia

CER (Serbo-Croatian Latin: Cifarski Elektronski Računar, lit. 'Digital Electronic Computer') was a series of early computers (based on vacuum tubes and transistors) developed by Mihajlo Pupin Institute in Yugoslavia in the 1960s and 1970s.

Models:

- CER-10 - 1960, based on vacuum tubes, transistors, electronic relays, and magnetic core memory. First Yugoslav digital computer (developed in "Vinca"-Institute) in (SFRY).
- CER-2 - 1963, a prototype model
- CER-20 - 1964, CER-30 - 1966, - the prototypes of the "electronic bookkeeping machine" for EI Niš and RIZ Zagreb;.
- CER-200 - 1966, series of 18 "electronic bookkeeping computers".
- CER-202-1968; CER-203 - 1972
- CER-22 - 1967, based on transistors, MSI circuits, magnetic core memory, punched cards and magnetic disks. Serie of 3 electronic systems, used for on-line banking operations and data processing applications;
- CER-12 - 1971, "electronic computer for business data processing", based on VLSI technology, wire wrapping boards, magnetic disks and magnetic tapes;
- CER-11 - 1966, based on transistors, core memory, Teletype printer etc. Mobile military computer (used in the JNA (Yugoslav People's Army);
- CER-101 Kosmos - 1973, based on VLSI circuits, core memory, magnetic drum, paper tapes, Teletype printers; Mobile computer in special military vehicles (used in the JNA's V.T. Institute);
- CER-111 - 1975, Mobile military computer, based on VLSI technology, Hard disk drive; Used in JNA until 1989.

== Models and types ==
TYPE	YEARS OF DESIGN; Principal designers; (End of use)	USERS	REMARKS
#1)CER-10 ‘Vinca’	1956-60.; Prof.dr Tihomir Aleksic et al.; (end of 1966)	SKNE-Vinca;DSUP-Tanjug;ETS-N.Tesla;	First yugoslav digital computer; El.tubes, transistors; Electronic relays; Core memories; Paper tapes; Teleprinter;
#2)CER-11	1965-66.; Prof.dr Tihomir Aleksic and his associates; (end of 1988)	JNA-GS SSNO	Mobile military computer; Transistors& I.C; Printed circuit plates; Paper tapes;Teletype printer;
#3)CER-20. CER-30	(1963–66);Prof. Tihomir Aleksic; Prof.N.Parezanovic	M.P.Institute; Ei-Nis; RIZ(TRS)Zagreb (Programmable calculators)	
#4)CER-22	1966-68; Dusan Hristovic; (end of 1975);	BeoBanka-Belgrade; Jugopetrol-Belgrade; Belgrade BVK vodovod & kanalizacija .	Serie of 3 computers; Transistors and MSI; Magnetic core memories; CDC 854 magnetic disks; Punched cards & tapes; Line printer;
#5)CER-200.202.203	1966-72; M.Momcilovic; R.Drobnjakovic; Miladin Dabic; (1989)	Planika-Kranj; PIK-Tamis; GIK-Banat; Kanal DTD-N.Sad; Jugodrvo Belgrade; Ei-Nis; Jugopetrol-Belgrade; VMA; Mehanografija; Poljobanka Belgrade; M. P. Institute.	Series of 20 computers; Transistors & I.C. (MSI); Magn.core memories; Printed circuits boards, ribbon connectors; PT reader & puncher; Magnetic cassettes; Teletype printer;
#6)CER-12	1969-71; Branimir Leposavic; Petar Vrbavac; (1997)	Vojvodina Bank-Zrenjanin; ERC-M.P.Institute Belgrade.	Serie of 2 computers;(VLSI);Wire wrapped boards; CDC.9432 magn.disks; ‘Ampex’magn.tapes; Line printer; Displays;
#7)CER-101 ‘Kosmos’	1972-73; Bogoljub Milivojevic; D.Hristovic; M.Hruska; (1989)	JNA-VTI Institute, Belgrade	Mobile computer in the spec. military vehicle;(VLSI); Paper tapes; Magn.drum type Vermont-1004; Line printer;
#8)CER-111	1974-75; Vladislav Paunovic; (end of 1988)	JNA- SSNO	Mobile military computer;(VLSI); wire wrapping; Hard Disk Singer Libroskop;

CER-Computers Table (author: Dušan Hristović, M.P.Institute, Belgrade University); GFDL and CCSA 3.0 License.

== See also ==
- History of computer hardware in Yugoslavia
- List of computer systems from Yugoslavia
