= Ivel Z3 =

Apple IIe compatible computer developed by Ivasim in 1980s

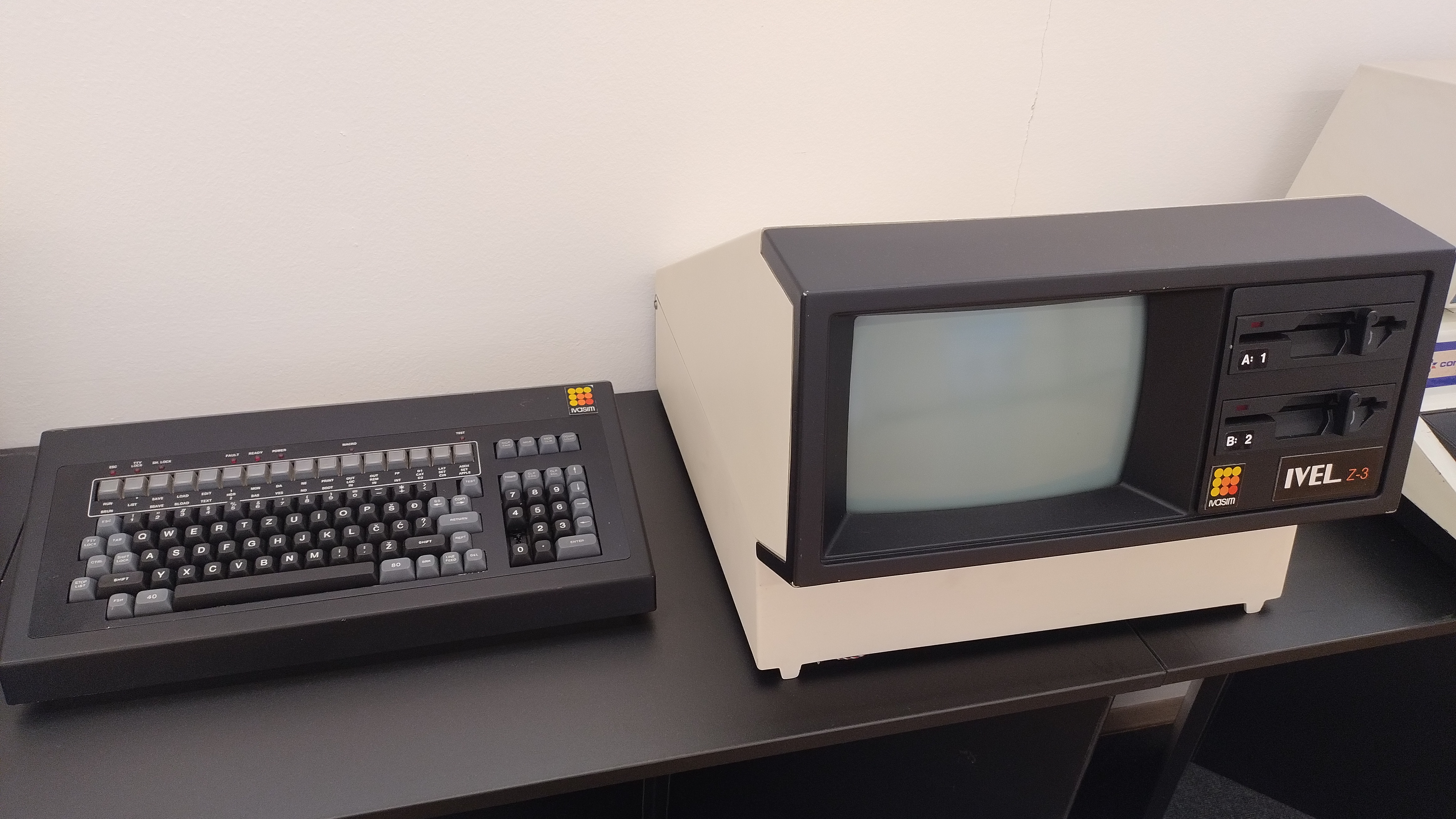
Ivasim Ivel Z-3

Ivel Z3 was an Apple IIe compatible computer developed by Ivasim in 1980s. It uses a MOS 6502 along with the Zilog Z80 for CP/M compatibility. A 5-20 MB hard drive and a Motorola 68000 was sold as optional additions.
