= Triglav (computer) =

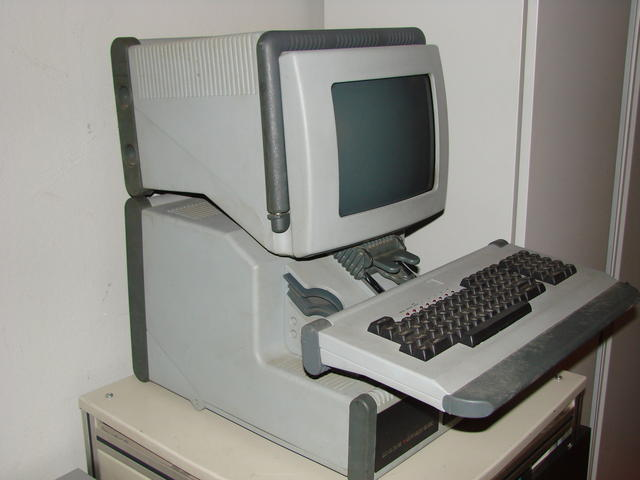
- Developer: Dušan Zalar, Vladimir Pečar
- Manufacturer: Iskra Delta
- Released: 1985; 41 years ago
- Operating system: μDelta/M (based on Micro/RSX), Xenix, OS-9, MS-DOS and RMX)
- CPU: Three options: DEC J-11, Intel 80286 and Motorola 68010
- Storage: Hard drive with a capacity between 40 and 80 MB
- Removable storage: 5.25" floppy drive and a microstreamer tape drive

Triglav was a computer from Slovenia developed in the 1980s and manufactured by Iskra Delta. It came to the market in 1985. It had options for three different central processing units (DEC J11, Intel 80286 and Motorola 68010) and could therefore run several different operating systems that were popular at the time (such as μDelta/M - based on Micro/RSX, Xenix, OS-9, MS-DOS and RMX). A hard drive with a capacity between 40 and 80 MB, 5.25" floppy drive and a microstreamer tape drive were also supported.

Triglav/J11 with μDelta/M was configured as a single or multi-processor system (up to four CPUs) with different multiprocessing options. It was designed by engineers Dušan Zalar (CPU and multiprocessing HW and SW architecture) and Vladimir Pečar (μDelta/M and multiprocessing SW architecture).

The computer was named after Triglav, the highest Slovenian mountain. With the name meaning "three-headed" it also symbolised the three CPU architectures supported by its design. In foreign markets, Triglav was named Trident. Trident, the three-pronged spear, similarly symbolizes the three CPUs.
