= Iskra Delta Partner =

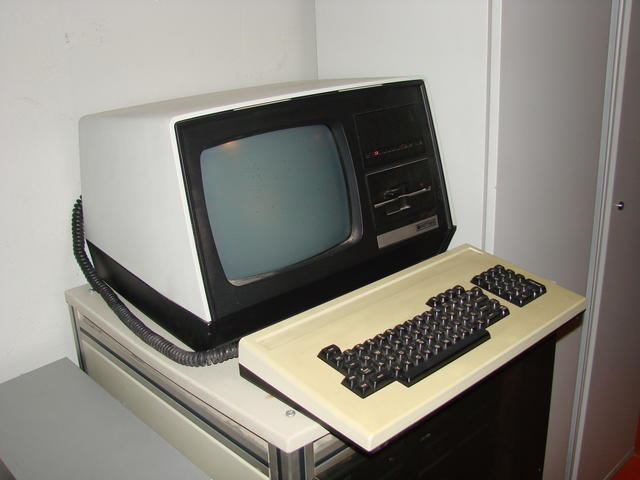
- Developer: Iskra Delta
- Type: computer
- Released: 1983; 43 years ago
- Operating system: CP/M version 3.0 and/or MP/M (multi-user version of CP/M)
- CPU: Z80A @ 4 MHz
- Memory: 2 x 64 KiB RAM / 4 KiB ROM
- Storage: 5.25" floppy drive
- Display: built-in 12 inch green monochrome monitor.
- Input: Keyboard full-stroke QWERTZ with numeric keypad

Iskra Delta Partner was a computer developed by Iskra Delta in 1983.

== Specifications ==
- Text mode: 26 lines with 80 or 132 characters each
- Character set: YUSCII
- I/O ports: three RS-232C, one used to connect printer (1200-4800 bit/s) and two general-purpose (300-9600 bit/s)
