= LPA512 =

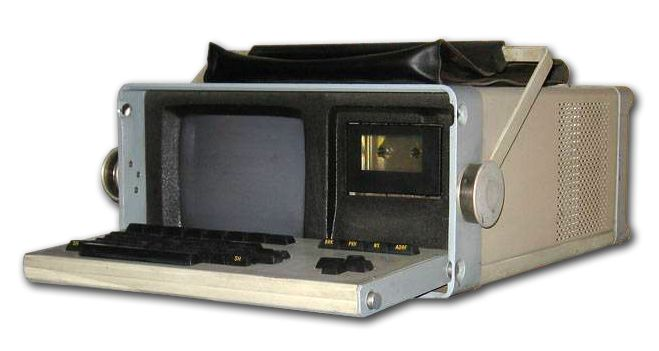
Side view of an LPA512

LPA512 (Serbian ЛПА512) was an industrial programmable logic controller—a small (438 x 286 x 278 mm), portable computer developed by the Ivo Lola Ribar Institute of Serbia in 1986 as an enhancement to its prior product, PA512. It was first deployed in the Maribor car factory.
