= TIM-600 =

1987 personal computer

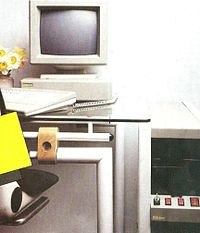
- TIM-600 computer system
- Developer: Mihajlo Pupin Institute
- Released: 1987; 39 years ago
- Operating system: Unix V.3.
- CPU: 80387 @ 20 MHz
- Memory: 8 x 2 MB

TIM-600 was an important PC computer system in the TIM series of microcomputers from Mihajlo Pupin Institute-Belgrade, developed from 1987 to 1988. It was based on the Intel microprocessor types 80386 and 80387. It has word-length of 32 bits, basic cycle time of 20 MHz and operating system Unix V.3. The TIM-600 computer system was presented at the Munich International Computer Exhibition in September 1988.

== System specifications ==
TIM-600 architecture was based on three system buses (32, 16 and 8 bits respectively). The CPU performs 5,000,000 simple operations per second. Primary memory RAM had a maximum capacity of 8 x 2 MB. There were a maximum of eight TIM terminals or other equipment units connected by RS-232C. Centronics types interface was used for the line printers. Also, there were possibilities for the connections of two hard disks as well as the magnetic cassettes and diskettes.

== Software ==
The TIM-600 uses the programming languages C++, Fortran, Cobol, BASIC and Pascal. Database management was performed by Informix and Oracle software.

== Applications ==
The TIM-600 computer system was used for business data processing in many offices in Serbia, for example in public, health, and scientific organizations; for process automation in industrial production; in road traffic control; in some banks; for military and government services, etc.

== See also ==
- Mihajlo Pupin Institute
- Personal computer
