= Lola 8 =

Computer developed by the Ivo Lola Ribar Institute

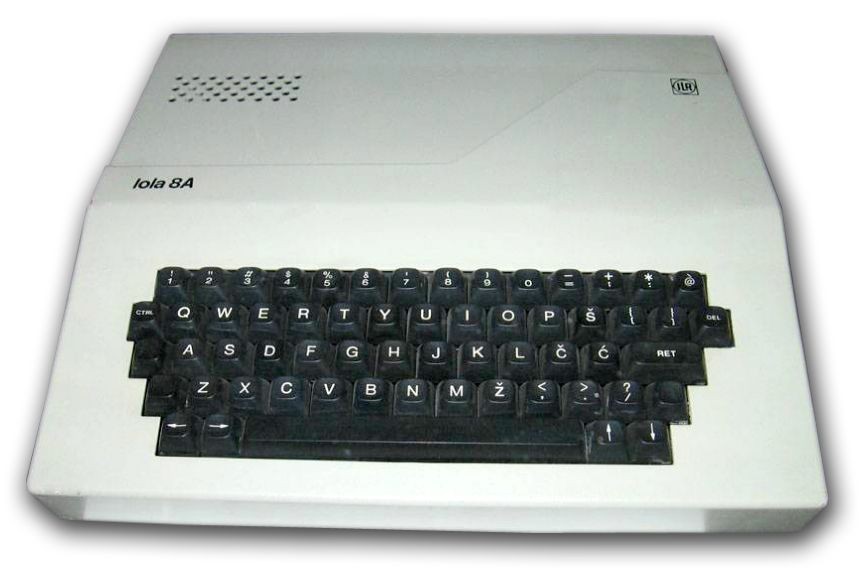
- Lola 8A
- Developer: Ivo Lola Ribar Institute
- Type: Home Computer
- Released: 1985; 41 years ago
- Operating system: BASIC
- CPU: Intel 8085
- Memory: 6 KB; 16 KB (Lola 8A)
- Removable storage: Cassette tape
- Display: Composite and RF video out
- Graphics: 320x200 (Lola 8A)
- Sound: AY-3-8912 (Lola 8A)

Lola 8 is a computer developed by Ivo Lola Ribar Institute of SR Serbia in 1982 and announced for release in 1985. As the manufacturer's focus was CNC equipment, Lola 8 was built out of components they used for CNC machines.

Originally likely designed as the industrial controller, the computer initially had a keyboard completely orthogonally laid out rectangular key caps. This was possibly done as a result of using standard CNC keyboard components that need to minimize the entry of environmental dirt into the system. Later designs (model "8A") used standard keyboard arrangement and were available in a number of schools as educational computers.

== Specifications ==
- CPU: Intel 8085
- ROM: 16 KB containing BASIC, 24 KB on Lola 8A
- RAM: 6 KB, 16KB on Lola 8A
- Storage: cassette tape
- Graphics: 320x200 on Lola 8A
- Sound: AY-3-8912 on Lola 8A
- I/O ports: cassette tape interface, composite and RF video out, audio and expansion connector
