= TIM-011 =

1987 microcomputer

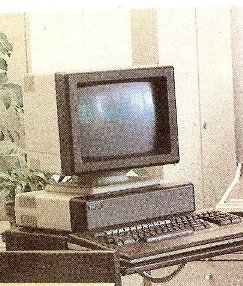
- TIM-011 Microcomputer at M.P.Institute
- Developer: Mihajlo Pupin Institute
- Released: 1987; 39 years ago
- Units sold: 1200
- Operating system: CP/M with ZCPR3
- CPU: HD64180 (Zilog Z80 compatible)
- Memory: 256 KB RAM
- Storage: 3.5-inch floppy drive
- Display: integrated green 512x256 monochrome monitor

TIM 011 is an educational or personal computer for school microcomputer developed by Mihajlo Pupin Institute of Serbia in 1987. There were about 1200 TIM-011 computers in Serbian schools in the starting from 1987 and in 1990s.

It were based on CP/M with Hitachi HD64180, Z80A enhanced CPU with MMU, 256KB RAM standard, 3.5" floppy drives and integrated 512 X 256 green-screen monitors with 4 levels of intensity.

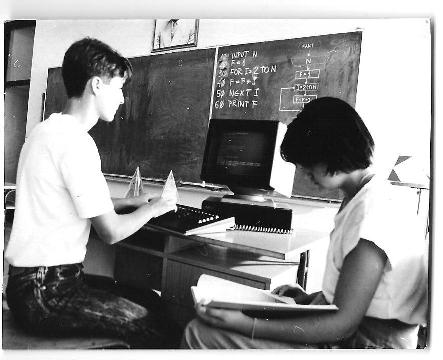
TIM-011 at a school

== Reference literature ==
- Dragoljub Milićević, Dušan Hristović (Ed): "Računari TIM" (TIM Computers), Naučna knjiga, Belgrade 1990.
- D.B.Vujaklija, N.Markovic (Ed): "50 Years of Computing in Serbia (50 godina računarstva u Srbiji- Hronika digitalnih decenija)", DIS, IMP and PC-Press, Belgrade 2011.
