= Iskra Delta 800 =

Iskra Delta 800 was a PDP-11/34-compatible computer developed by Iskra Delta in 1984.

== Specifications ==
- CPU: J11
- RAM: Up to 4 MiB addressable
- ROM: 4 KiB
- Operating system: Delta/M (somewhat modified RSX-11M)
