= Iskradata 1680 =

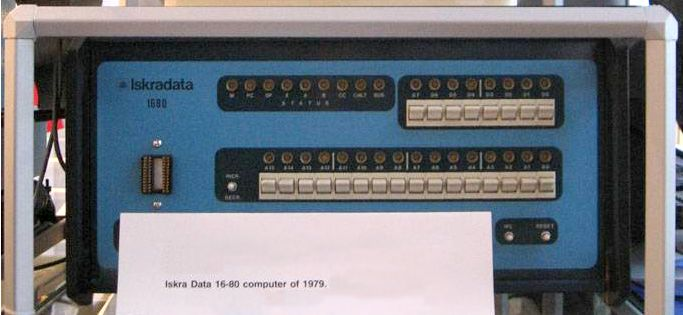
- Developer: Iskradata
- Manufacturer: Iskra Ljubljana
- Type: computer
- Released: 1979; 47 years ago

Iskradata 1680 was a computer developed by the Iskradata in 1979. Its manufacturer was Iskra Ljubljana. It was the recipient of the IF Product Design Award in 1981.
