= Mihajlo Pupin Institute =

Serbian research institute

Coordinates: 44.8071239°N 20.5050118°E

- Official logo
- Native name: Михајло Пупин Институт
- Founded: 29 January 1959; 67 years ago
- Headquarters: Volgina 15, Zvezdara, Serbia
- Area served: Worldwide
- Key people: Sanja Vraneš (Director)
- Revenue: ▲€29.87 million (2017)
- Net income: ▼€0.82 million (2017)
- Total assets: ▲€22.17 million (2017)
- Total equity: ▲€8.85 million (2017)
- Number of employees: 436 (2017)
- Subsidiaries: Subsidiaries
- Website: www.pupin.rs/en/

Mihajlo Pupin Institute (Serbian: Институт Михајло Пупин, romanized: Institut Mihajlo Pupin) is an institute based in Belgrade, Serbia. It is named after Mihajlo Idvorski Pupin and is part of the University of Belgrade.

It is notable for manufacturing numerous computer systems used in former Yugoslavia, especially early CER and later TIM line of computers.

== Departments ==
The institute is well known in wide range of fields. In the science community, it is known for early work in humanoid robotics.

The institute and companies owned by it compete in fields such as:

- System integration and networking,
- Information systems for government and industry, Internet/Intranet IS
- E-commerce, e-government applications
- Decision support systems, expert systems, intelligent Internet applications,
- Power systems control, supervision and optimization
- Process control and supervision,
- Traffic control, GPS
- Telecommunications
- Digital signal processing
- Simulators, training aids, specialised H/S systems
- Image processing
- Real-time systems (large scale and embedded)
- Turn-key engineering solutions
- Robotics

== Subsidiaries ==
- IMP-Automatika d.o.o. Belgrade
- IMP-Računarski sistemi d.o.o. Belgrade
- IMP-Telekomunikacije d.o.o. Belgrade
- Idvorski laboratorije d.o.o. Belgrade
- IMP-Piezotehnologija d.o.o. Belgrade
- IMP-Poslovne usluge d.o.o. Belgrade
- IMP-Naučnotehnološki park d.o.o. Belgrade

== See also ==
- CER Computers
- HRS-100 computer
- TIM-100 and TIM-011
- Michael I. Pupin - Serbian scientist after whom this institute is named.
- History of computer hardware in the SFRY
- Rajko Tomović
- Roki Vulović - former professor and Bosnian Serb folk singer
- Miomir Vukobratović
