= List of home computers by video hardware =

This is a list of home computers, sorted alphanumerically, which lists all relevant details of their video hardware.

Home computers are the second generation of desktop computers, entering the market in 1977 and becoming common during the 1980s. A decade later they were generally replaced by IBM PC compatible "PCs", although technically home computers are also classified as personal computers.

Examples of early home computers are the TRS-80, Atari 8-bit computers, BBC Micro, ZX Spectrum, MSX, Amstrad CPC 464, and Commodore 64. Examples of late home computers are MSX 2 systems, and the Amiga and Atari ST systems.

Note: in cases of manufacturers who have made both home and personal computers, only machines fitting into the home computer category are listed. Systems in the personal computer category, except for early Macintosh PCs, are generally based on the VGA standard and use a video chip known as a Graphics Processing Unit. Very early PCs used one of the much simpler (even compared to most home computer video hardware) video display controller cards, using parts like the MDA, the Hercules Graphics Card, the CGA and the EGA standard). Only after the introduction of the VGA standard could PCs really compete with the home computers of the same era, such as the Amiga and Atari ST, or even with the MSX-2. Also, not listed are systems that are typically only gaming systems, like the Atari 2600 and the Bally Astrocade, even though these systems could sometimes be upgraded to resemble a home computer.

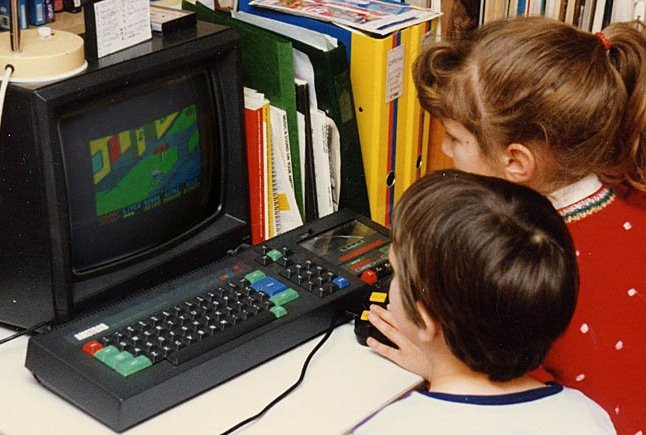
The Amstrad CPC 464 was a typical home computer of the 1980s. The game displayed is 1985's Paperboy.

== The importance of having capable video hardware ==
Early home computers all used similar hardware and software, mostly using the 6502, the Z80, or in a few cases the 6809 microprocessor. They could have as little as 1 KB of RAM or as much as 128K, and software-wise, they could use a small 4K BASIC interpreter, or an extended 12K or more BASIC. The basic systems were quite similar with the exception of the video display hardware. As a result, the success of a system proved to primarily rely on the performance of the video display hardware, since this had a direct implication on the kind of games that could be played on the system.

The most important aspect of a home computer was how far programmers could push the hardware to create games. A case in point is the Commodore 64. Its microprocessor lacked advanced math functions and was relatively slow. In addition, the built-in BASIC interpreter lacked any sort of graphics commands, as it was the same version that was developed for the older Commodore PET (a computer without any high-resolution graphics capabilities at all). However, these drawbacks were of little consequence, because the C64 had the VIC-II chip. When accessed by machine language programs, the graphic capabilities of this chip made it practical to develop arcade-style games on a home system. Additionally, specific machine language code exploiting quirks of the VIC-II chip allowed for special tricks to draw even better pictures out of the VIC-II chip. The comparatively large memory and the audio capabilities of the C64 also lent themselves well toward the production of larger games. An example of the opposite is the Aquarius by Mattel which had such incredibly limited video hardware that it was retracted from the market after only four months due to poor sales.

=== Video arbitration logic ===
One major problem that early computer video hardware had to overcome was the video bus arbitration problem. The problem was determining a way to give both the video hardware (VDU) and the CPU continuous read access to the video RAM. The obvious solution, using interleaving time slots for the VDU and RAM was hard to implement because the logic circuits and video memory chips of the time did not have the switching speed necessary to do so. For higher resolutions, the logic and the memory chips were barely fast enough to support reading the display data, let alone for dedicating half the available time for the slow 8-bit CPU. That being said, one system, the Apple II, was one of the first to use a feature of the data-bus logic of the 6502 processor to implement a very early interleaving time slot mechanism to eliminate this problem. The BBC Micro used 4 MHz RAM with a 2 MHz 6502 in order to interleave video accesses with CPU accesses.

Most other systems used a much simpler approach, and the TRS-80's video logic was so primitive that it simply did not have any bus arbitration at all. The CPU had access to the video memory at all times. Writing to the video RAM simply disabled the video display logic. The result was that the screen often displayed random horizontal black stripes on screen when there was heavy access to the video RAM, like during a video game.

Most systems avoided the problem by having a status register that the CPU could read, and which showed when the CPU could safely write to the video memory. That was possible because a composite video signal blanks the video output signal during the "blanking periods" of the horizontal and especially the long vertical video sync pulses. So by simply waiting for the next blanking period, the stripes were avoidable. This approach did have one disadvantage, it relied on the software not to write to the screen during the non-blanking periods. If the software ignored the status register the stripes would re-appear. Another approach, used by most other machines of the time, was to temporarily stop the CPU using the "WAIT/BUSRQ" (Z80) "WAIT" (6809) or "SYNC" (6502) control signal whenever the CPU tried to write to the screen during a non-blanking period. Yet another, more advanced, the solution was to add a hardware FIFO so that the CPU could write to the FIFO instead of directly to the RAM chips, which were updated from the FIFO during a blanking interval by special logic circuitry. Some later systems started using special "two-port" video memory, called VRAM, that had independent data output pins for the CPU interface and the video logic.

== The main classes of video hardware ==
There are two main categories of solutions for a home computer to generate a video signal:

- A custom design, either built from discrete logic chips or based around some kind of custom logic chips (an ASIC or PLD).
- A system using some form of video display controller (VDC), a VLSI chip that contained most of the logic circuitry needed to generate the video signal

Systems in the first category were the most flexible and could offer a wide range of (sometimes unique) capabilities, but generally speaking, the second category could offer a much more complex system for a comparatively lower price.

The VDC based systems can be divided into four sub-categories:

- Simple video shift register based solutions, have a simple "video shifter chip", and the main CPU doing most of the complex stuff. Only one example of such a chip for a home computer exists, the RCA CDP1861 used in the COSMAC VIP. It could only create a very low-resolution monochrome graphic screen. The chip in the Sinclair ZX81 also is a video shifter but is a custom logic chip (a ULA) rather than a single-purpose commercial IC like the CDP1861. Dedicated Video shifter chips did have some use in very early game systems, most notably the Television Interface Adaptor chip in the Atari 2600. The Atari ST's chip used a DMA system to read out video data independent of the main CPU and contained a palette RAM, and resolution/color mode switching logic.
- CRTC (Cathode Ray Tube Controller) based solutions. A CRTC is a chip that generates most of the basic timing and control signals. It must be complemented with some "Video RAM" and some other logic for the "arbitration" so that the CPU and the CRTC chip can share access to this RAM. To complete the design, a CRTC chip also needs some other support logic. For example, a ROM containing the bitmap font for text modes, and logic to convert the output from the system into a video signal.
- Video interface controllers were a step up on the ladder, these were true VLSI chips that integrated all of the logic that was in a typical CRTC based system, plus a lot more, into a single chip. The VIC-II chip is probably the best-known chip of this category.
- Video co-processor chips are at the highest end of the scale; Video interface controllers that can manipulate, and/or interpret and display, the contents of their own dedicated Video RAM without intervention from the main CPU. These chips are highly flexible offering options and features with minimal CPU involvement that on other systems are impossible or at best difficult to produce, requiring extensive CPU overhead. The Atari ANTIC/GTIA and Amiga OCS/ECS/AGA are well known examples of this high-feature category. But note that not all video co-processors are powerful, some are even simpler than many Video interface controllers, notably the primitive SAA5243 which is still technically a co-processor.

== Explanation of the terms used in the tables ==
System Name
The name of the system, or if there are many similar versions, the name of the most well-known variant, see Notes.
Year
The year that the first version of this system came on the market.
Chip name
The name of the chip that was used as the basis for the video logic.
Video RAM
The maximum amount of RAM used for the video display, depending on the resolution used the system may use less.
Video mode(s) [i.e. Text mode(s) and Graphics modes]
The numbers of characters per line and lines of text the system supported and the number of colors they could have. Sometimes more than one mode was possible: The number of horizontal and Vertical pixels the system could display in a high resolution mode and The number of colors each pixel could have in high-resolution mode, where several high-resolution modes exist each one is listed separately. Beginning with the Xerox Alto, systems forwent independent text modes and drew text on a high-resolution graphics screen. This required more video RAM, but also freed computer fonts from a fixed grid.
Font extras
Describes extra graphical possibilities a video system had because of optional features of their character sets, there are currently three categories:
LC
Some systems could only display upper case characters in text mode because of their limited character set, If a system was able to also support lower case letters in a text mode, (in any high-resolution mode it is of course always possible), then there is LC (for Lower Case) in this column.
BG
Some systems used a matrix of blocky pixels instead of a letter in their font sets (or used dedicated hardware to emulate them, like the TRS-80 did), to support some sort of all points addressable (APA) mode. It's hard to call this a "high resolution" mode because the resolution could be as low as 80×48 pixels, but in any case, it was possible to draw pictures with them. In the case of systems that used such a system as its "APA" mode, there is BG (for Block Graphics) in this column.
SG
Some other systems used semi graphical characters like box-drawing characters dots and card symbols, and "graphical building block" geometric shapes such as triangles to give the system the appearance it could do high-resolution graphics while in reality it could not, Systems like that have SG (for semi graphical characters) in this column. Many systems like the PET had a few of such characters dedicated to blocking graphics for an APA mode as well, often only for 2×2 matrix characters. Sometimes the system filled (or could fill) a reprogrammable section of the font set which such characters, these systems mainly fall under the "soft font" heading. Note that the BG and SG entries are only used when the system relied on them, had them predefined in its default character set, or, (what often happened on early systems) had them printed on the keyboard keys for direct entry in combination with some kind of "graphic shift" key.
Soft font
When the system had a programmable font RAM instead of a static "font ROM", or when the video system did not have a hardware text mode, but painted text in the high-res screen using software, the video display wasn't dependent on a permanent font set, in this case we are talking about a system with a "soft" font.
Color resolution
in "high-resolution mode" it was often the case that a certain pixel could not be given an arbitrary color, often certain clusters of pixels, (quite often 8×8 pixels large) shared the same "color attribute", so as to spare video memory, as an 8-bit computer only had a 64 KB address space, and the CPU often had limited capabilities to manipulate video memory, therefore it was often necessary to keep the video RAM size as small as possible, so a minimum of the address space of the micro was used, and also the video content could be changed relatively rapidly.
Palette support
If the system could translate a "logical color" into a (larger number) or true colors using a palette mechanism then this column lists the number of logical colors the palette could accept, and the number of colors it could translate to.
HW accel.
Short for "hardware acceleration", can take several forms, the most obvious form is "bit blitting", that is the moving of groups of pixels from one place in video memory to another without the CPU doing any of the moving, another often-used technique is hardware scrolling which in fact emulates moving the whole screen in the video RAM, the third form of hardware acceleration is the use of sprites implemented in hardware. Some systems also supported drawing lines (and sometimes rectangles) using special line drawing hardware. The entry in the column reveals which methods the hardware supported with two letters for each method.
BL
For blitter
DR
For hardware supported line drawing
SC
For hardware scrolling support
SP
For hardware sprite support
TE
For hardware tile engine support in graphic mode
Sprite details
Covers three facets of the sprite support hardware the system used. Each number in the table cell is preceded by two letters.
S#
For the first facet, is the total number of hardware sprites the system could support, in hardware (not counting re-use of the same hardware). if the system doesn't support hardware sprites at all the table cell only contains "-" . If S# is 1 then the single sprite is most often used to support a mouse cursor.
SS
For the second facet, is the size of the sprite in screen pixels. A sprite could be displayed by the hardware, as a matrix of horizontal by vertical pixels. If more than one sprite size mode is available each one is listed.
SC
For the third facet, is the number of sprite colors, it gives the number of colors that a sprite could have. It is about the total number of colors that could be used to define the sprite (transparent NOT included), so if a sprite could only be displayed as a figure in a single color the number is 1. If more than one sprite color mode is available each one is listed.
SP
For the fourth facet, is the number of sprites per scan line. Hardware sprites use a kind of Z-buffer to determine which sprite is "on top". Availability of hardware to do this limits the number of sprites that can be displayed on each scan line. This number tells how many sprites could be displayed on a scanline before one of them became invisible because of hardware limitations.
Unique features
If the video display has unique features (or limitations) they will be listed here, if space is a limitation the remaining special features are expressed as notes.

A "-" in a table cell means that the answer is irrelevant, unknown, or in another way has no meaning, for example, the sprite size of a system that does not support hardware sprites.

A "?" in a table cell means that the entry has not yet been determined. If a ? follows an entry it means that other options than the listed ones may also exist.

"Mono" in a table cell means monochrome that is, for example, black on white, or black on green.

== The list of home computers and their video capabilities ==
=== Systems with video logic designed as terminals ===
System name	Year	Chip name	Video RAM	Video mode(s)		color resolution	Font extras	soft fonts	palette support	HW accel	unique features
System name	Year	Chip name	Video RAM	Text	Graphics	color resolution	Font extras	soft fonts	palette support	HW accel	unique features
Apple I	1976		720 bytes	40×24 Mono	—N/a	40×24 Mono					
Datapoint 2200	1971		840 bytes	80×12 Mono	—N/a	80×12 Mono	LC			None	Shift registers for RAM
MUPID	1983		64K	40×25 16+16 colors	320×240 16+16 colors	320×240	LC, BG, SG	Yes	16 fixed colors, and 16 chooseable from a palette of 4096 colors	?	Designed by academics as a BTX terminal, but with the capabilities of a home computer
SOL-20	1976	—	1K	64×16 Mono	Limited 512×128 Mono with MC6574	(64×16)	LC, SG	No	None	None	One of the first systems with built-in video hardware

=== Systems using software-driven video generation ===
System name	Year	Chip name	Video RAM	Video mode(s)		color resolution	Font extras	soft fonts	unique features
System name	Year	Chip name	Video RAM	Text	Graphics	color resolution	Font extras	soft fonts	unique features
Aamber Pegasus	1981	—	512 bytes	32×16 Mono text with programmable 7×9 characters		(32×16)	LC	Yes	
Galaksija	1983		512 bytes	32×16 Mono	"Full": Limited 256×208 Mono Semi: 64×48 Mono	(64×48; 32, later 256×208)	BG	—	All systems were essentially "home-built", on a single-sided PCB. Like the ZX81 it was software-driven.
OSI Superboard II, Compukit UK101 and clones	1979		1K	32×32 or 64×16 Mono	"Full": limited 256×256 or 512×128 Mono using full extended character set ROM Semi: 64×96 or 128×48 Mono using 64 characters (pseudo graphics) of the 128 characters of the optional extended character set ROM	(32×32 or 64×16)	LC, SG		Early system with 256 character font, standard add-on card for full 256×256 graphics
OSI C4P	1980		2K	64×32 8 colors	"Full": limited 512×256 8 colors Semi: 128×96 8 colors using part of its pseudo graphic characters set	64×32	LC, SG		
ZX80, ZX81	1980, 1981		792 bytes	32×24 Mono	Full: 256×192 Mono Semi: 64×48 Mono	(32×24)	BG, SG	No	"slow mode", software-generated display
BCS3	1984		336 bytes in BASIC 2.4	27×12 in BASIC 2.4 40×21 in BASIC 3.1	Full: 128×64 Mono (additional hardware)		LC, SG	No	Simple homebrew home computer form GDR, with software-generated display

=== Systems using discrete logic ===
==== With independent text mode(s) ====
System name	Year	Chip name	Video RAM	Video mode(s)		color resolution	Font extras	soft fonts	palette support	unique features
System name	Year	Chip name	Video RAM	Text	Graphics	color resolution	Font extras	soft fonts	palette support	unique features
ABC80	1978		1K	40×24 Mono	Semi: 78×72 Mono	(39×24)	LC, BG	—		One of the first systems with serial attributes like Ceefax and Prestel systems, needed the first character of a line for switching to graphics mode, thus the horizontal resolution is 78, not 80
Apple II	1977		18K	40×24 Mono/6 colors	Full: 280×192 Mono/6 colors Semi: 40×48 15 colors	40×48, 140×192				First known system with 4 line "caption" and software scaling and rotation
Commodore PET 2001	1977	—	1000 bytes	40×25 Mono 9-inch Mono monitor	"Full": Limited 320×200 Mono Semi: 80×50 using part of its pseudo graphic characters set	(80×50, 40×200)	BG, SG	—		Original computer with non ASCII (PETSCII) character set
Exidy Sorcerer	1978		1920 bytes	64×30 Mono	"Full": Limited 512×240 Mono Semi: 128×90 Mono	(128×90, 512×240)	LC, SG	Yes		Programmable character set allowed TRS-80 and PET like graphics
Ferguson Big Board	1980, 1982		1K	80×24 Mono			LC	No		
Grundy NewBrain	1982		max 20K	32×25/30, 40×25/30, 64×25/30, or 80×25/30 Mono	Full: 256×256, 320×256, 512×256, 640×256 Mono Semi: 64×75/90, 80×75/90, 128×75/90, 160×75/90 Mono	(64×75/90, 80×75/90, 128×75/90, 160×75/90; 256, 320, 512, 640×256)	LC, BG	—		Built in one line VFD, Videotext mode support
Interact Home Computer	1979		2184 bytes	17×12 4 colors	Semi: 112×78 4 colors	112×78	Characters were drawn on a 112×78 pixel graphics screen which means that each character was 6×6 pixels, including blank space between the characters, which led to very blocky characters, which simply didn't allow for distinct lower case characters.	In theory, the "graphics" screen text was drawn on could be the text-mode semigraphics screen for a more standard (for the time) 56×26 or 56×39 high-resolution text mode, though in practice this real text mode was apparently never used (if it even could be).	4 of 8	
Kaypro II series	1982		2 KB	80×24 Mono, on 9-inch built in CRT	Semi: Presumably 160×72 Mono	(80×24)	LC, BG	No	-	
NASCOM 1 NASCOM 2	1977 1979		1K	48×16 Mono	N/A		LC	No	None	
Osborne 1, Osborne Executive and Osborne Vixen	1981, 1982, 1984		4K	52×24 Mono on 5-inch CRT, later 80×24 on 7-inch CRT	"Full": Presumably limited 416×192 Mono, later limited 640×192 using its pseudo graphic characters set	(52×24, later 80×24)	LC, SG		None	Uses virtual screen to make up for limitations of original 5-inch CRT, a feature presumably not dropped from later models in order to achieve full backward compatibility
Panasonic JR-200	1983		2K+2K	32×24 8 colors	"Full": 256×192 8 colors Semi: 64×48 8 colors	32×24	LC, BG		None	unique semi-graphic pixel color attribute scheme made that each of the 64×48 semi-graphic "pixels" (consisting of a quarter of an 8×8 pixel character space) could have its own independent color, these semi-graphics could be combined with predefined characters, or programmable characters, each of which could also have an independent foreground and background color out of a palette of 8.
Jupiter Ace	1982		2K	32×24 Mono	"Full": Limited 256×192 Mono by using the 128 characters Semi: 64×48 Mono	32×24	LC, BG	Limited	—	
LINK 480Z and Research Machines 380Z	1982		2K	40×25 or 80×25 Mono	A separate independent video display generator board could be added that did support high resolution graphics of 640×192×1, 320×192×2 or 160×96×4 bits per pixel		LC		n of 16 with Hires expansion board; 16 out of 256 logical intensities with composite interface, 16 logical colors with TTL RGB interface	
MZ-80K	1979		1000 bytes	40×25 Mono	"Full": Limited 320×200 Mono Semi: 80×50 Mono	(40×25)	LC, BG, SG	No	None	many well-chosen pseudo-graphics characters
KC 87, KC85/1	1987		960 bytes 87.x1: 960+960 bytes	85/1, 87: 40×20 Mono for 85/1, 87.x0; 16 foreground colors + 8 background colors for 87.x1	85/1, 87: Limited 320×192 Mono for 85/1, 87.x0; 16 foreground colors + 8 background colors for 87.x1 using its pseudo graphic characters set	87.x1: 40×24	LC			
TRS-80 Models I and III	1977, 1980		up to 1K	32×16 or 64×16 Mono	Semi: 64×48 or 128×48 Mono	(32×16 or 64×16)	LC, BG	No	None	The canonical system to use Text semigraphics
TRS-80 Model 4	1983		1920 bytes	32×16, 40×24, 64×16 or 80×24 Mono	Semi: 64×48, 80×72, 128×48 or 160×72 Mono	(32×16, 40×24, 64×16 or 80×24)	LC, BG			Can display full 640×240 or 512×192 graphics with a standardized expansion board

==== Without independent text mode(s) ====
System name	Year	Chip name	Video RAM	Video mode(s)	color resolution	Font extras	soft fonts	palette support	unique features
Apple III	1980		64K	40×24 Text in 280×192 Graphics or 80×24 in 560×192 2 or 16 colors	140×192, 280×192; 140×192, 560×192	LC			228 programmable characters, bundled with Apple II software emulator
Apple Lisa/Macintosh XL	1983		Presumably 2×32760 bytes	720×364r/608×432s mono	(720×364r/608×432s)	LC	style="background:#9EFF9E;color:black;vertical-align:middle;text-align:center;" class="table-yes"|Yes		
Apple Macintosh 128K and other compact models	1984	—	2×21888 bytes	512×342 mono	(512×342)	LC	style="background:#9EFF9E;color:black;vertical-align:middle;text-align:center;" class="table-yes"|Yes		SE/30 and Classic were the only 32-bit models to use discrete logic to implement video hardware.
DAI Personal Computer	1979	—	31680 bytes	88×65, 176×130, 352×260, 60×24 Text in 528×240 Graphics 4 or 16 colors	88×65, 176×130, 352×260, 528×240	LC	—	4 of 16	split screen text and graphics mode with 4-line caption
PMD 85	1985		9600 bytes	48×32 Text in 288×256 Graphics 4 gray-scales, 4 colors for 85/3	288×256	LC		4 out of ? gray-scales, 4 out of ? colors for 85/3	no text modes, only a single 288×256×2 bits per pixel graphics mode
Tiki 100	1984	—	32K	40×25 Text in 256×256 Graphics 16 colors, 80×25 in 512×256 4 colors, 160×25 in 1024×256 2 colors	256×256, 512×256, 1024×256	LC	Yes	256	SC
Robotron KC 85/2	1984		16K	320×256	40×64 (16fg8bg)		Yes	No	CPU VRAM access can cause visual distortions, Half-character attribute cells (8×4) (Note: Relationship to KC85/1 in name only. The KC85/2 and KC85/3 were very similar overall, the only difference being more ROM and an internal piezo speaker)
KC 85/3	1986		16K	320×256	40×64 (16fg8bg)	LC	Yes	No	CPU VRAM access can cause visual distortions, Half-character attribute cells (8×4)
KC 85/4	1988		64K	320×256	40×256 (16fg8bg), 320×256 (4 (Note: white, black, red, cyan))	LC	Yes	No	Vertical video RAM, single-line vertical attribute cells (8×1), 2 buffers
Xerox Alto	1973		61206 bytes	606×808 Mono	(606×808)	LC	Yes		First known system with graphics First known system without separate text buffer

=== Systems using simple Video Shift Registers ===
System name	Year	Chip name	Video RAM	Video mode	soft fonts	unique features
COSMAC VIP, Telmac 1800	1977	CDP 1861	256 bytes	64 × 32 Mono graphics	Yes	Incredibly primitive but supporting color
Oscom NANO, ETI 660, Telmac 2000	1980, 1981	CDP 1864	1.5K	64 × 192 Mono graphics	Yes	Incredibly primitive but supporting color

=== Systems using custom logic ICs ===
==== With independent text mode(s) ====
System name	Year	Chip name	Video RAM	Video mode(s)		color resolution	Font extras	soft fonts	palette support	HW accel	unique features
System name	Year	Chip name	Video RAM	Text	Graphics	color resolution	Font extras	soft fonts	palette support	HW accel	unique features
Apple IIe, Apple IIc	1983, 1984	MMU/IOU	27K	40×24 or 80×24 Mono	Full: 280×192 6 or 15 Colors or 560×192 15 colors Semi: 40×48 or 80×48 15 colors	40×48, 80×48; 140×192, 280×192; 140×192	LC	No	None		
Apple IIGS	1986	VGC	32K	40×24 or 80×24 16 colors	Full: 280×192 6 or 16 color–s or 560×192 16 colors, 320×200 16–3200 colors or 640×200 4-800 pure or 16 dithered colors Semi: 40×48 or 80×48 16 colors	40×48, 80×48; 140×192, 280×192; 140×192; 320×200, 640×200	LC	No	Apple modes none, other modes 4096		
Mattel Aquarius	1983	TEA1002	2000 bytes	40×25 16 colors	"Full": Presumably at least limited 320×200 16 colors through (assembly language routines and) graphical symbols included in its character set Semi: 80×75 16 colors	40×25	LC, BG	—	None		
TRS-80 Color Computer Model 3	1986	GIME	72000 bytes	20×16–25, 32×16–25, 40×16–25, 64×16–25 or 80×16–25 16 colors	Full: 64×64 4 colors, 128×64, 128×96, 128×192 2 or 4 colors; 160×192–225, 256×192–225, 320×192–225 2, 4, 16 or 256 colors; 512×192–225 or 640×192–225 2, 4 or 16 colors Semi: 64×32 9 colors, 64×48 4 colors	64×64, 128×64, 128×96, 128×192, 160×192–225, 256×192–225, 320×192–225, 512×192–225 or 640×192–225; 64×32, 64×48	BG, LC	No		?	

==== Without independent text mode(s) ====
System name	Year	Chip name	Video RAM	Video mode(s)	color resolution	Font extras	soft fonts	palette support	HW accel	unique features
Atari ST	1985	ST Shifter	32K	320×200 16 colors, 640×200 4 colors or 640×400 2 colors	320×200, 640×200	LC	Yes	Yes 512		Hi-res non-interlaced 31 kHz-72 Hz
Electronika BK -0010/-0011	1985	ULA	16K	32×25 Text in 256×256 Graphics 4 colors or 64×25 in 512×256 2 colors	256×256 or 512×256	LC	Yes	Yes	SC	
Enterprise 64	1985	Nick	64K	Full: 80×256 256 colors, 160×256 16 colors, 40×32 Text in 320×256 Graphics 4 colors, 80×32 or 28 in 640×256p/ 64 in 512i 2 colors Semi: 80×96, 160×84p/96p/192i 2 or 4 colors via soft fonts	80×256, 160×256, 320×256, 640×256p/512i: 40×32, 80×32 or 28 or 80×64 interlaced	LC	Yes	Yes		Advanced for its time
Oric 1	1983	HCS 10017 ULA	8K	Full: 40×28 Text in 240×200 Graphics 8 colors (limited 240×224 through soft font) Semi: 80×84 8 colors through soft font	40×224	LC	Yes	None	None	
Nimbus PC-186	1984	FPGA	64K	40×25 Text in 320×250 Graphics 16 colors or 80×25 in 640×350 4/16 colors	320×250 or 640×350	LC	—	4 of 16		Early x86-based non IBM-PC system with good graphics
SAM Coupé	1989	ASIC	24K	32×24 Text in 256×192 Graphics 8 or 16 colors or 85×24 in 512×192 4 colors	32×24, 32×192 or 256×192; 512×192	LC	—	16 entries 128 colors		Backward compatible with Sinclair Spectrum
Sinclair ZX Spectrum	1982	ULA	6912 bytes	Full: 32×24 Text in 256×192 Graphics 15 colors Semi: 64x×8 15 colors	32×24	LC, BG	—	None		color limitations
Timex/Sinclair TS2068	1983	Timex SCLD (CPLD)	12288 bytes (max)	Full: 32×24 Text in 256×192 Graphics 15 colors or 64×24 in 512×192 Mono Semi: 64×48 15 colors or 128×48 Mono	32×24, 32×192	LC, BG	—	None		swapping between two 256×192 screens
ZX Spectrum Next	2020	FPGA	6912 bytes, 48K (layer 0) + 1280 bytes sprite RAM	Full: 32×24 Text in 256×192 Graphics 15 or 256 colors 80×24 in 512×192 2 or 256 colors Semi: 64×48 15 colors	32×24, 32×192, 256×192, 512×192	LC, BG, SC, SP	Yes	256 entries 512 colors	64 sprites, hardware scrolling, copper, tile-map	backward compatible with older Spectrums
Sinclair QL	1984	ZX8301 ULA	32K	Full: 42×25 Text in 256×256 Graphics 8 colors or 85×25 in 512×256 4 colors Semi: 84×75 8 colors or 170×75 4 colors through soft font, 128×128 8 colors or 256×128 4 colors stippled	256×256 or 512×256, 128×128 or 256×128	LC	Yes	none		hardware pixel-based blinking
Thomson MO5	1984	EFGJ03L gate array	16K	Full: 40×25 Text in 320×200 Graphics 16 colors Semi: 80×75 16 colors through soft font	40×25, 320×200	LC	Yes	none		
Thomson TO7	1982	MC 13000 ALS gate array on TO-7/70	14000 bytes, either 15000 or 16000 bytes for TO7/70	40×25 Text in 320×200 Graphics 8 colors, 16 for TO7/70	40×200	LC		none		
Thomson systems MO6, TO8 and TO9+	1986	custom TI gate array plus EF-9369P color palette	16K	Full: 8 modes from 160×200 16 colors to 640×200 2 colors (40×25 Text in 320×200 Graphics and 80×25 in 640×200) Semi: 80×75 4 colors or 160×75 2 colors through soft font	from 160×200 to 640×200	Yes		16 entries 4096 colors		

=== Systems using a CRTC ===
==== MC6845 or second source ====
===== With independent text mode(s) =====
System name	Year	Video RAM	Video mode(s)		color resolution	Font extras	soft fonts	palette support	HW accel	unique features
System name	Year	Video RAM	Text	Graphics	color resolution	Font extras	soft fonts	palette support	HW accel	unique features
ABC 800 series	1981	1K (800C), 2K (800M, 802, 806) + 128K (806)	40×24 or 80×24 (800M, 802, 806) 8 or 2 colors	Full: 256×240 or 512×240 16 colors (806) semi: 78×75 8 or 2 colors [or 158×75 (800M, 802, 806)]	256×240 or 512×240 (806), 40×24 or 80×24 (802, 806)	LC, BG	No	None	None	HR board for 800 and 802 provides 16K for 240×240 graphics in 4 of 8 colors
Aster CT-80	1979	1K or 2K	64×16, 32×16, 80×25 or 40×25 Mono	Semi: 128×48, 64×48, 160×75 or 80×75 3 gray scales	128×48, 64×48, 160×75 or 80×75	LC, BG, SG	No	None	Dual memory map support	Early clone of the TRS-80 with additional graphic modes
Commodore PET 4000 and 8000 series	1980, 1981	1000 bytes (4000), 2000 bytes (8000)	40×25 (4000) or 80×25 (8000) Mono, on 12-inch Mono monitor	"Full": Limited 320×200 Mono (4000) or 640×200 Mono (8000) Semi: 80×50 Mono (4000) or 160×50 Mono (8000) using part of its pseudo graphic characters set	[40×25 (4000) or 80×25 (8000)]	BG, SG	No	None		
LNW-80	1982	1K or 2K	80×24, 64×16 or 32×16 8 colors	Full: 480×192 2 colors or 384×192 8 colors Semi: 160×72 or 128×48 8 colors	480×192, 64×16	LC, BG	No			
LOBO MAX-80	1982	1K or 2K	80×24 or 64×16 Mono	"Full": Limited 640×240 or 512×192 Mono via programmable character set Semi: 160×72 or 128×48 Mono	(80×24 or 64×16)	LC, BG	Yes			
MicroBee	1982	4K	64×16 Mono	"Full": 17 limited modes from 512×128 to 512×256 Mono in steps of 8 lines Semi: 128×48 Mono	64×16	LC, BG	Yes			
Sony SMC-70	1982	38KB	40×25 or 80×25 2 colors	160×100, 320×200 16 colors, 640×200 4 colors or 640×400 2 colors	40×25 or 80×25, 160×100, 320×200, 640×200, 640×400	LC	Yes	n of 16		Genlocker (G & P versions)

===== Without independent text mode(s) =====
System name	Year	Video RAM	Video mode(s)	color resolution	Font extras	soft fonts	palette support	HW accel	unique features
Camputers Lynx	1983	32K	Full: 40×24 Text in 256×252 Graphics 8 colors Semi: Presumably 80×72 8 colors	40×24, 256×252	LC	No	None	None	
Colour Genie	1982	16K	"Full": Limited 40×24 Text in 320×192 Graphics using 8×8 pixel programmable characters 16 colors Semi: 160×96 4 colors or presumably 80×72 16 colors	40×24, 160×96	LC, BG, SG	Yes	4 of 16		Programmable characters
Sharp X1 (CZ-800C)	1982	48000 bytes	40×25 Text in 320×200 Graphics, 80×25 in 640×200 8 colors	320×200, 640×200	LC	Yes	None		powerful APA color PCG
Casio FX-9000P	1980	4K	32×16 Text in 256×128 Graphics Mono	(256×128)	LC	Yes	None	?	

==== Other models ====
System name	Year	Chip name	Video RAM	Video mode(s)		color resolution	Font extras	soft fonts	palette support	HW accel	unique features
System name	Year	Chip name	Video RAM	Text	Graphics	color resolution	Font extras	soft fonts	palette support	HW accel	unique features
Compucolor II	1977	SMSC CRT5027	4K	64×32 or 64×16 8 colors on 13-inch built-in color screen	"Full": Limited 512×256 8 colors Semi: 128×128 8 colors or presumably 128×96 8 colors or 128×48 8 colors (through block graphics characters included in the font)	64×16 or 64×32, 128×128	BG				said to be the first color home computer on the market, very nice graphics for the time
Comx-35 and clones	1983	CDP1869 CDP1870	3K	40×24 8 foreground colors (4 per 6×8 or 6×9 pixels, 1 per 6-pixel line) + 8 background colors (for the whole screen)	"Full": Limited 240×192(NTSC)/240×216 (PAL)/240×384 (expanded RAM) 8 foreground colors (4 per 6×8 or 6×9 pixels, 1 per 6 pixel line)+ 8 background colors (for the whole screen) Semi: 80×72/120×96 8 foreground colors (4 per 6×8 or 6×9 pixels, 1 per 6-pixel line)+ 8 background colors (for the whole screen)	40×24	BG, SG	Yes	8 foregrounds + 8 background out of?		
Durango F-85	1977	Intel 8275	2 KB	80×24 or 64×16 Mono, on 9-inch built-in CRT	Semi: Presumably 160×72 or 128×48 Mono	(80×24 or 64×16)	LC, BG				
MZ-700	1982	M60719	2000 bytes	40×25 8 colors	"full": Limited 320×200 8 colors semi: 80×50 8 colors	40×25	LC, BG, SG	No			
PC-8001	1979	ìPD3301D	3K, 16K, 48K	40×20, 40×25, 80×20 or 80×25 8 colors	Full: 320×200 or 640×200 8 colors Semi: 160×100 8 colors	320×200 or 640×200, 80×25	LC, BG	No			
Robotron 1715	1984	Intel 8275	2 KB	80×24 or 64×16 Mono	Semi: Presumably 160×72 or 128×48 Mono	(80×24 or 64×16)	LC, BG	for 1715W model			had two switchable ROMs for Cyrillic/Latin letters
Telmac TMC-600	1982	CDP1869 CDP1870	1K	Presumably 40×24 8 colors	Semi: 80×72 8 colors	40×24	LC	No			
Matra Alice 32/90 and clones and Philips VG5000	1984	EF9345	8K	32×16, 40×25 or 80×25 9 colors	Full: 160×125 or 320×250 16 colors Semi: 64×32, 80×50 or 160×50 9 colors	32×16, 40×25, 80×25	LC, BG	3×100 user definable characters, but only in 40×25 text mode	Full and half-intensity foreground plus background out of 8	DR	Video Input

=== Systems using a Video Interface Controller ===
==== MC6847 or second source ====
===== Text 32×16 9 colors Graphics Full: 64×64 4 colors, 128×64, 128×96, 128×192 2 or 4 colors or 256×192 2 colors Semi: 64×32 9 colors or 64×48 4 colors color resolution 64×64, 128×64, 128×96, 128×192 or 256×192; 64×32 or 64×48 =====
System name	Year	Chip name	Video mode(s)	color resolution	Font extras	HW accel.	Sprite details
Acorn Atom, APF Imagination Machine, APF-MP1000, GEM 1000 / Charlemagne 999, Laser 100/110, Laser 200/210 and 310, SPC-1000 (later models), CCE MC-1000, Gakken Compact Vision TV Boy, Dragon 32/64, TRS-80 MC-10 and clones	1978, 1979, 1980, 1981, 1982, 1983, 1985	MC6847			BG	None	
SPC-1000 (early models)	1983	AMI S68047			BG	None	
NEC PC-6001	1981	M5C6847P-1	Semi: 64×48 9 colors				
TRS-80 Color Computer 1 & 2 and clones	1980	MC6847+MC6883	Full: 64×64 4 colors, 128×64, 128×96, 128×192 2 or 4 colors or 256×192 Semi: 64×64, 64×96 or 64×192	64×64, 64×96 or 64×192	BG	The MC6883 could actually be used as a limited sort of sprite hardware in semigraphics modes, making them in practice limited 256×192×9 graphics modes	

==== Other models ====
===== With independent text mode(s) =====
System name	Year	Chip name	Video RAM	Video mode(s)		color resolution	Font extras	soft fonts	palette support	HW accel	Sprite details	unique features
System name	Year	Chip name	Video RAM	Text	Graphics	color resolution	Font extras	soft fonts	palette support	HW accel	Sprite details	unique features
VIC-20	1980	VIC	506 bytes + 506 nibbles	22×23 16 colors (upper 8 unusable as foreground)	Technically full: 160×160 16 colors (upper 8 unusable as foreground) (or more in special cases) or limited 176×184 16 colors (upper 8 unusable as foreground) Semi: technically 44×46 16 colors (upper 8 unusable as foreground) using part of its PETSCII character set	22×23	LC, BG, SG	Yes	not really, but something similar could be done by manipulating the four colors out of sixteen chosen for each tile, or the global background color	The VIC chip allowed a character generator in RAM to redefine the pixel-by-pixel depictions of the on-screen characters and it allowed for double-height characters (8 pixels wide, 16 pixels high). It was possible to get a fully addressable 160 by 160 screen by filling the screen with a sequence of 200 different double-height characters, then turning on the pixels selectively inside the RAM-based character definitions. The 200-character limitation was so that enough bytes would be left over for the screen character grid itself to remain addressable by the VIC chip. The Super Expander cartridge provided such a mode in BASIC, although it often had to move the BASIC program around in memory to do it. It was also possible to fill a larger area of the screen with addressable graphics using a more dynamic allocation scheme if the contents were sparse or repetitive enough.		The VIC-20 had hardware support for a light pen, but its most obvious features were its text mode with very wide characters and its built-in composite video output and the NTSC VIC's interlaced mode
Commodore 64	1982	VIC-II	16K	40×25 16 colors	Full: 160×200 or 320×200 16 colors (semi: 80×50 16 colors using part of its pseudo graphic characters set)	40×25	LC, BG, SG	Yes	1 (320 px) or 3 (160 px) foreground + 1 background out of 16	SP, SC	S#= 8 SS= 24×21, 12×21 SC=1 SP=8	Many
Commodore 65	1991	VIC-III	up to 500K supported	40×25 or 80×25 16 colors	full: 160×200, 160×400, 320×200, 320×400, 640×200, 640×400, 1280×200 or 1280×400 up to 256 colors (semi: 80×50 or 160×50 16 colors using part of its pseudo graphic characters set)	40×25; 160×200, 160×400, 320×200, 320×400, 640×200, 640×400, 1280×200 or 1280×400	LC, BG, SG	Yes	4096	SP, SC, BL	S#= 8 SS= 24×21, 12×21 SC=1 SP=8	All the Commodore 64, plus DMA blitter support & genlock.
Commodore 16, 116 and Plus/4	1984	TED	8K	40×25 16 colors	Full: 160×200 or 320×200 121 colors (semi: 80×50 16 colors using part of its pseudo graphic characters set)	40×25	LC, BG, SG	Yes	1 (320 px) or 3 (160 px) foreground + 1 background out of 121	None		Some
IBM PCjr & Tandy 1000	1984	"Video Gate Array" + 6845 (PCjr) / Tandy proprietary chip	32K	40×25 or 80×25 16 colors	Full: 160×200, 320×200 4 or 16 colors or 640×200 2 or 4 colors ("semi": 160×100 16 colors)	40×25 or 80×25; 160×200, 320×200 or 640×200	LC	No	2 or 4 out of 16			
IBM PS/1	1990	"VGA"	128K	Commonly 80×25, 40×25, 80×43 or 80×50 16 colors on 14-inch monitor	Commonly 640×480, 640×400, 640×350 16 colors or 320×200 16 or 256 colors	Commonly 640×480, 640×400, 640×350 or 320×200	LC	Yes	16 or 256 colors out of a 262144 colors palette (6 bit per RGB channel)	SC	—	"Video tweaking"

===== Without independent text mode(s) =====
System name	Year	Chip name	Video RAM	Video mode(s)	color resolution	Font extras	soft fonts	palette support	HW accel	Sprite details	unique features
Acorn Archimedes	1987	VIDC1	480KB (from system RAM)	Text sized by software in Flexible Graphics, no more than 256 colors (e.g. 800×600 16cols)	up to 1152×896	LC	Yes	16 groups of 16 from 4096	SP	S#= 1 SS= 32×n SC=3 SP=1	
Acorn RiscPC	1994	VIDC20	2MB, 1MB	Text sized by software in Flexible Graphics, up to 16M colors (e.g. 1600×1200 256cols)	up to 1600×1200	LC	Yes	In ≤256 color modes	SP	S#= 1 SS= 32×n SC=3 SP=1	
NEC PC-8801	1981	SGP	48K	Full: 80×25 Text in 640×200 Graphics, 640×400 2 colors, 40×25 in 320×200 or 320×400 8 colors Semi: 160×100 8 colors	160×100; 640×200, 640×400, 320×200 or 320×400	LC, BG, SG	Yes	8 or 2 out of 512	No		early highres support
VideoBrain	1978	UV-201 & UV-202	168 bytes	384×336i Graphics 16 colors 16×7 Text in 128×56 Semigraphics 16 colors	16×7, 384×336i	SG	No	None			

=== Systems using a video co-processor ===
==== With independent text mode(s) ====
System name	Year	rowspan="2" Chip name	Video RAM	Video mode(s)		color resolution	Font extras	soft fonts	palette support	HW accel	Sprite details	unique features
System name	Year	Text	Video RAM	Graphics		color resolution	Font extras	soft fonts	palette support	HW accel	Sprite details	unique features
Atari 8-bit computers	1979	ANTIC, CTIA/GTIA	18K+ of 64K	32/40/48×24 (30), 16/20/24×24 (30) or 16/20/24×12 (15) 2 (5) colors	32/40/48×24 (30), 64/80/96×48 (60), 64/80/96×96 (120), 128/160/192×96 (120), 128/160/192×192 (240) 2 or 4 colors, 256/320/384×192 (240) 2 colors, 64/80/96×192 (240) 9/16/8 or 16 colors	32/40/48×24 (30), 64/80/96×48 (60), 64/80/96×96 (120), 128/160/192×96 (120), 128/160/192×192 (240), 64/80/96×192 (240)	LC, BG, SG	Yes	16 out of 128 (with FGTIA or GTIA) or 256 (only with GTIA)	SP, SC	S#=4+4 or 5 SS=8 + 2 or 5×256(max) SC=1 SP=4+4 or 5	Many, especially hardware support for a Light pen and the Display list. Possibly the most capable hardware of the early 80s considering it was designed in the 70s.
Coleco Adam, VTech CreatiVision, MSX1, Pencil 2, Memotech MTX, Sega SC-3000, Sord M5, SV-318 and SV-328, Tatung Einstein, TI-99/4, TI-99/4A, Tomy Tutor/Pyuuta	1979-1984	TMS9918A	16K	32×24 16 colors or 40×24 2 colors	Full: 256×192 16 colors Semi: 64×48 16 colors	32×24, 32×192	LC, (BG, SG)	Yes	None	SP, TE	S#=32 SS=8×8, 16×16 SC=1 SP=4	The TMS9918 was designed for the TI-99/4, it has text characters of 8×8 (32 characters per line) or 8×6 pixels (40 characters per line), and features limited attribute clash color limitations, it has 32 monochrome sprites of 8×8 or 16×16 pixels.
MSX2, MSX2+/TurboR	1986, 1988	Yamaha V9938, Yamaha V9958	64K, 128K, or 192K	32×24, 32×26.5 16 colors, 40×24, 40×26.5 2 colors, 80×24 or 80×26.5 4 colors	Full: 256×192p, 256×212p, 256×384i, 256×424i 4, 16 or 256; later also 12499 or 19268 colors, 512×192p, 512×212p, 512×384i, 512×424i 4 or 16 colors Semi: 64×48p, 64×53p, 64×96i or 64×106i 16 colors	32×24, 40×24, 80×24, 32×26.5, 40×26.5 or 80×26.5; 32×192; 256×192p, 512×192p, 256×212p, 512×212p, 256×384i, 512×384i, 256×424i, 512×424i	LC, BG, SG	Yes	2, 4 or 16 out of 512 colors	SP, TE, SC, BL, DR	S#=32 SS=8×8, 16×16 SC=16 SP=8	Many unique features
P2000T	1980	SAA5243	960 bytes	40×24 8 colors	Semi: 80×72 8 colors	40×24	LC, BG	No	None		—	One of the earliest systems with color Teletext graphics

==== Without independent text mode(s) ====
System name	Year	Chip name	Video RAM	Video mode(s)	color resolution	Font extras	soft fonts	palette support	HW accel	Sprite details	unique features
FM-7	1982	MC6809	48K, 96 or 144K in AV mode	40×25 or 40×20 Text in 320×200 Graphics 4096 colors for FM-77AV and AV20 or 262144 colors for FM-77AV40 or 80×25, 80×20 Text in 640×200 Graphics 8 colors	320×200 or 640×200	LC	Yes	None			320×200×4096 colors for FM-77AV and AV20 or 262144 colors for FM-77AV40 and 640×200×8 colors without color limitations
Amiga (first generation)	1985	Agnus and Denise	1M "Chip RAM"	Any Text size up to 80×32 (80×64 in interlaced mode) in 320×200p, 640×200p, 320×400i or 640×400i Graphics 2 to 64 colors and 4096 colors	320×200p, 640×200p, 320×400i or 640×400i	LC	Yes	2 to 32 colors out of 4096 colors	BL, SP, SC, DR	S#=8 SS=16 wide, arbitrary height SC=3 or 15 SP= 8	Many unique features
Amiga (second generation)	1990	Super-Agnus and Hires Denise	1M or 2M "Chip RAM"	Any Text size up to 160×32 (160×64 in interlaced mode) in NTSC Graphics: 320×200, 640×200, 320×400, 640×400 2 to 64 colors and 4096 colors, 1280×200p or 1280×400i 4 colors PAL Graphics: 320×256, 640×256, 320×512, 640×512 2 to 64 colors and 4096 colors, 1280×256p or 1280×512i 4 colors	NTSC: 320×200, 640×200, 320×400, 640×400, 1280×200p or 1280×400i PAL: 320×256, 640×256, 320×512, 640×512, 1280×256p or 1280×512i	LC	Yes	2 to 32 colors out of 4096 colors	BL, SP, SC, DR	S#=8 SS=16 wide, arbitrary height SC=3 or 15 SP= 8	even more unique features
Amiga (Third generation)	1992	Advanced Graphics Architecture (AGA)	2M "Chip RAM"	Any Text size up to 160×32 (160×64 in interlaced mode, 100×75 in Super72 mode) in NTSC: 320×200 .. 1280×400 Graphics 2 to 256, 4096 to 262144 colors PAL: 320×256 .. 1280×512 Graphics 2 to 256, 4096 to 262144 colors VGA: 640×480 2 to 256, 4096 to 262144 colors Super72: 400×300 .. 800×600 (interlaced) Graphics 2 to 256, 4096 to 262144 colors	NTSC: 320×200 .. 1280×400 PAL: 320×256 .. 1280×512 VGA: 640×480 Super72: 400×300 .. 800×600 (interlaced)	LC	Yes	2 to 256 colors out of 16,777,216 colors	BL, SP, SC, DR	S#=8 SS=64 wide, arbitrary height SC=2 or 15 SP=8	still more unique features
Atari Falcon	1992	VIDEL, COMBEL (Blitter)	1 to 14M "Chip RAM"	Any Text size up to 160×32 in CRT: 320×200 to 1600×608 Graphics 2,4,16,256 colors (indexed), 32768 colors (+overlay), 65536 colors (Hi-Color) VGA: 640×480 or 800×608 Graphics 2,4,16,256 colors (indexed), 32768 colors (+overlay), 65536 colors (Hi-Color)	CRT: 320×200 to 1600×608 VGA: 640×480 or 800×608	LC	Yes	2 to 65536 colors out of 262,144 colors	BL	—	scan doubler

=== Systems that fall into multiple classifications ===
For these systems, it is established that they are based on multiple technologies. The hardware chosen to be used by these systems may have a substantial or insubstantial impact on the video they output.

System name	Year	Chip name	Video RAM	Video mode(s)		color resolution	Font extras	soft fonts	palette support	HW accel	Sprite details	unique features
System name	Year	Chip name	Video RAM	Text	Graphics	color resolution	Font extras	soft fonts	palette support	HW accel	Sprite details	unique features
Acorn Eurocard systems	1980	MC6845 + SAA5050	1K	40×25 8 colors	Semi: 80×75 8 colors	40×25	LC, BG	No	None			
Commodore CBM-II Series	1982	MC6845/VIC-II	2000 bytes with CRTC, 16K with video interface controller	80×25 Mono on 12-inch Mono monitor with CRTC or 40×25 16 colors with video interface controller	Full: limited 640×200 Mono with CRTC or 160×200 or 320×200 16 colors with video interface controller Semi: 160×50 Mono with CRTC (or 80×50 16 colors with video interface controller) using part of its pseudo graphic characters set	(80×25 with CRTC) or 40×25 with video interface controller	LC with video interface controller, BG, SG	No	1 (320 px) or 3 (160 px) foreground + 1 background out of 16 with video interface controller	SP, SC with video interface controller	S#= 8 SS= 24×21, 12×21 SC=1 SP=8 with video interface controller	
Commodore 128	1985	VIC-IIE (40 column mode), VDC (80 column mode)	16K+16K (128) or 64K (128D) dedicated to VDC	40×25, 80×25 or 80×50 16 colors	Full: 160×200 or 320×200 (40 column mode), 640×200 or 640×400 (80 column mode) 16 colors (semi: 80×50, 160×50 or 160×100 16 colors using part of its pseudo graphic characters set)	40×25 (40 column mode), 640×200 or 640×400 (80 column mode)	1 (320 px) or 3 (160 px) foreground + 1 background out of 16 (40 column mode)	No	SP, SC (40 column mode); BL (80 column mode)	S#= 8 SS= 24×21, 12×21 SC=1 SP=8 (40 column mode)		Uses two different video circuits
Amstrad CPC	1984, 1990	MC6845+ASIC	16K	20×25 16 colors, 40×25 4 colors or 80×25 2 colors	160×200 16 colors, 320×200 4 colors or 640×200 2 colors	160×200, 320×200 or 640×200	LC	Yes	17 of 27 (original), 32 of 4096 (Plus)	SC, SP (Plus)	S#=16 SS=16×16 SC=1 SP=16 (Plus)	3-level RGB (original), screen control (Plus)
BBC Micro	1981	MC6845+SAA5050	20K (max)	80×32 or 80×25 2 colors, 40×32 2 or 4 colors, 40×25 2, 4 or 8 colors, 20×32 4 or 8 colors	Full: 640×256, 640×200 2 colors, 320×256, 320×200 2 or 4 colors or 160×256 4 or 8 colors Semi: 80×75 8 colors	640×256, 320×256, 160×256, 640×200 or 320×200; 40×25	LC, BG	No	16	None		Teletext mode, shadow RAM support
NEC PC-6001 MKII	1983, 1984	MC6845+M5C6847P-1	50K	32×16 or 40×20; later also 40×25, 80×20 or 80×25 9 or 16 colors	Full: 64×64 4 or 16 colors, 128×64, 128×96, 128×192 2, 4 or 16 colors, 256×128, 256×192 2 or 16 colors, 160×200, 320×200 4 or 16 colors; later also 640×200 4 colors Semi: 64×32 9 or 16 colors or 64×48 4, 9 or 16 colors or 80×40 16 colors; later also 80×50, 160×40, 160×50 16 colors	64×64, 128×64, 128×96, 128×192, 256×128, 256×192, 160×200, 320×200; later also 640×200: 32×16 or 40×20; later also 40×25, 80×20 or 80×25	LC, BG	No	2 or 4 of 16	None		—
Polycorp Poly-1	1980	2× SAA5050 + SAA5020 + discrete logic	48K	40×24, 80×20 8 colors	Full: 240×204 or 480×204 8 colors Semi: 80×72 8 colors	240×204 or 480×204, 40×24	LC, BG	None	Also used three Teletext chips designed for TV's.|	None		
Sharp X68000	1987	VINAS 1 + 2, VSOP, CYNTHIA / Jr, RESERVE	1056K	from 16×16 to 128×128 256 colors	from 256×256 to 1024×1024 256 colors	from 256×256 to 1024×1024	LC	Yes	65,536 palette	SP	S#=128 SS=16×16 SC=16 SP=32	special hardware options

=== Systems that could not be classified ===
For these systems, it could not be established what technology they are based on, therefore, some information regarding them may be inaccurate.

System name	Year	Chip name	Video RAM	Video mode(s)		color resolution	Font extras	soft fonts	palette support
System name	Year	Chip name	Video RAM	Text	Graphics	color resolution	Font extras	soft fonts	palette support
Agat series	1983	Unknown	8 KB	32×32 16 colors	64×64 16 colors, 128×128 8 colors or 256×256 2 colors	64×64, 128×128 or 256×256	LC	Unknown	n out of 16
Orao	1984	Unknown	up to 24 KB	32×32 up to 8 Gray levels	Full: 256×256 up to 8 Gray levels Semi: 64×96 up to 8 Gray levels	32×32, 256×256	LC	Yes	
Vector-06C	1987	Unknown	32 KB	32×32 2 or 16 colors or 64×32 2 or 4 colors	256×256 2 or 16 colors or 512×256 2 or 4 colors	256×256 or 512×256	LC	Unknown	256

== See also ==
- List of computer hardware palettes
- Semigraphical characters
- Semigraphics
- Video Display Controller
