= Thomson EF9345 =

Semigraphic microprocessor by SGS-Thomson Microelectronics

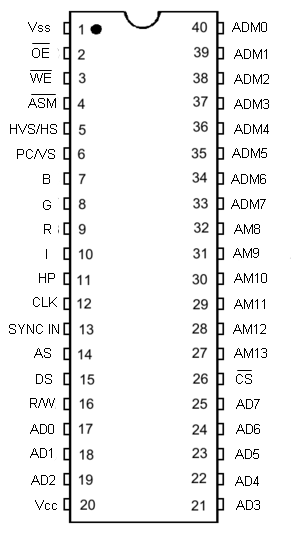
EF9345 pinout

The EF9345 from SGS-Thomson Microelectronics, Inc., was a semigraphic single chip microprocessor for video image control, encapsulated in a 40-pin DIP and used primarily in the Matra Alice 32, Matra Alice 90 and Philips VG5000 microcomputers. It was also the video processor used in Minitel 1b terminals, built by either Alcatel and Philips totalling more than 2 million units.

The EF9345 was capable of displaying 8 colors (RGB primaries), 128 alphanumeric characters and 128 semigraphic characters. It had one semigraphic mode and 40- and 80-column text modes. It was able to address up to 16KB of dedicated video RAM.

== Video Modes ==
- 50/60 Hz output
  - Interlaced or progressive scan
- Semigraphics:
  - 128 standard character set with 5×7 pixel font dimensions. User definable 8×10 pixel alphanumeric or semigraphic sets.
- 40 characters × 25 rows text mode (similar to teletext):
  - 8 × 10 pixel font
  - Selectable background and foreground colors
  - Styles: double height, double width, blinking, reverse, underline, conceal, insert, accentuation of lowercase characters
- 80 characters × 25 rows text mode:
  - 6 × 10 pixel font
  - Styles: blinking, underlining, reverse, color
- 8 colors (3-bit RGB palette):

== On-Chip Character Generator ==
The on-chip character generator offered several character sets, including alphanumeric and videotext compatible semigraphics.

G0 Alphanumeric Character Set in 40 or 80 Character/Row Mode
	0x	1x	2x	3x	4x	5x	6x	7x
0	⸮	º	SP	0	@	P	-	p
1	Â	±	!	1	A	Q	a	q
2	É	é	"	2	B	R	b	r
3	£	ë	#	3	C	S	c	s
4	â	ï	$	4	D	T	d	t
5	Ç	ç	%	5	E	U	e	u
6	Ë	û	&	6	F	V	f	v
7	À	à	'	7	G	W	g	w
8	Ù	÷	(	8	H	X	h	x
9	È	è	)	9	I	Y	i	y
A	Œ	œ	*	:	J	Z	j	z
B	Ê	ê	+	;	K	[	k	▏
C	←	¼	,	<	L	\	l	│
D	î	½	-	=	M	]	m	▕
E	→	¾	.	>	N	↑	n	▔
F	↓	ô	/	?	O	▁	o	█

G0 Alphanumeric Character Set in 40 Character/Row Mode - R003
	0x	1x	2x	3x	4x	5x	6x	7x
0	▔	º	SP	0	@	P	-	p
1	¨	±	!	1	A	Q	a	q
2	É	é	"	2	B	R	b	r
3	£	§	#	3	C	S	c	s
4	÷	`	$	4	D	T	d	t
5	Ç	ç	%	5	E	U	e	u
6	Ä	ä	&	6	F	V	f	v
7	Ö	ẞ	´	7	G	W	g	w
8	Ü	à	(	8	H	X	h	x
9	È	è	)	9	I	Y	i	y
A	Œ	œ	*	:	J	Z	j	z
B	ü	ù	+	;	K	[	k	{
C	←	¼	,	<	L	\	l	│
D	î	½	-	=	M	]	m	}
E	→	¾	.	>	N	^	n	~
F	↓	ô	/	?	O	▁	o	█

G0 Alphanumeric Character Set in 40 Character/Row Mode - R005
	0x	1x	2x	3x	4x	5x	6x	7x
0	~	º	SP	0	@	P	-	p
1	§	±	!	1	A	Q	a	q
2	ü	é	"	2	B	R	b	r
3	£	ë	#	3	C	S	c	s
4	â	ï	$	4	D	T	d	t
5	}	ç	%	5	E	U	e	u
6	ä	û	&	6	F	V	f	v
7	ö	à	'	7	G	W	g	w
8	ù	÷	(	8	H	X	h	x
9	ẞ	è	)	9	I	Y	i	y
A	Œ	œ	*	:	J	Z	j	z
B	{	ê	+	;	K	[	k	▏
C	←	¼	,	<	L	\	l	│
D	î	½	-	=	M	]	m	▕
E	→	¾	.	>	N	↑	n	▔
F	↓	ô	/	?	O	▁	o	█

G10 Semigraphic Character Set (videotex compatible)
	4x	5x	6x	7x
0	SP	🬏	🬞	🬭
1	🬀	🬐	🬟	🬮
2	🬁	🬑	🬠	🬯
3	🬂	🬒	🬡	🬰
4	🬃	🬓	🬢	🬱
5	🬄	▌	🬣	🬲
6	🬅	🬔	🬤	🬳
7	🬆	🬕	🬥	🬴
8	🬇	🬖	🬦	🬵
9	🬈	🬗	🬧	🬶
A	🬉	🬘	▐	🬷
B	🬊	🬙	🬨	🬸
C	🬋	🬚	🬩	🬹
D	🬌	🬛	🬪	🬺
E	🬍	🬜	🬫	🬻
F	🬎	🬝	🬬	█

G11 Stroke Set
	0x	1x
0		
1	🮡	╵
2	🮣	╶
3	🮥	└
4	🮢	╷
5	🮩	│
6	🮦	┌
7	🮪	├
8	🮠	╴
9	🮧	┘
A	🮨	─
B	🮬	┴
C	🮤	┐
D	🮭	┤
E	🮫	┬
F	🮮	┼

G20 Accentued Character Set
	0x	1x	2x	3x
0		¯	´	`
1		˙	¨	,

G21 Accentued Character Set - R000
	0x	1x
0	-	p
1	a	q
2	b	r
3	c	s
4	d	t
5	e	u
6	f	v
7	g	w
8	h	x
9	i	y
A	j	z
B	k	▏
C	l	│
D	m	▕
E	n	▔
F	o	█

G21 Accentued Character Set - R003
	0x	1x
0	-	p
1	a	q
2	b	r
3	c	s
4	d	t
5	e	u
6	f	v
7	g	w
8	h	x
9	i	y
A	j	z
B	k	{
C	l	│
D	m	}
E	n	~
F	o	█

== See also ==
- Thomson EF936x
- Thomson EF9340 [VIN] & EF9341 [GEN] (precursory couple for this video processor)
- Thomson EF9347 (successor of this video processor)
- Motorola 6847
- Motorola 6845
- TMS9918
- MOS Technology VIC-II
- List of home computers by video hardware
