= TRS-80 MC-10 =

1983 Tandy microcomputer

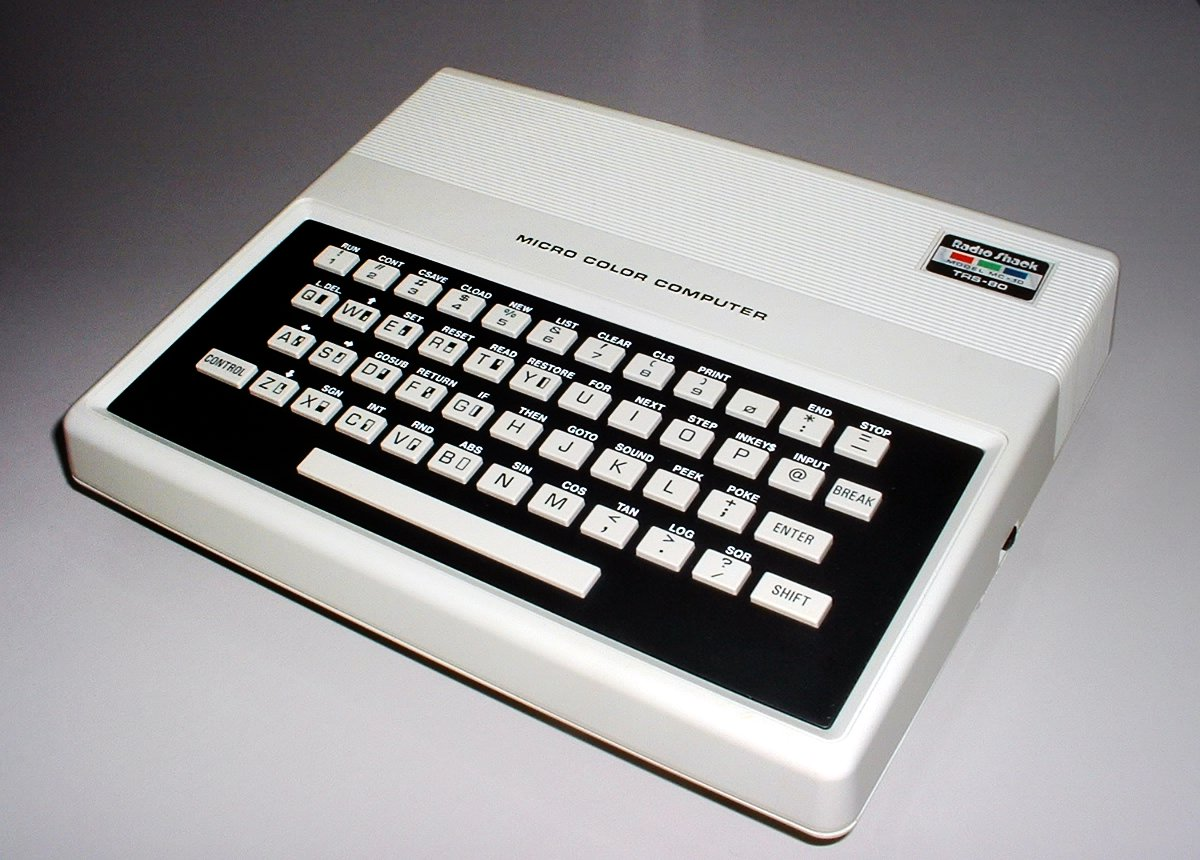
- TRS-80 MC-10
- Released: 1983; 43 years ago
- Introductory price: US$119.95 (equivalent to $390 in 2025)
- Discontinued: 1984
- Operating system: 8 KB (Micro Color Basic, developed by Microsoft) ROM
- CPU: Motorola MC6803 @ 0.89 MHz
- Memory: 4 KB on-board, expandable to 20 KB via external expansion pack
- Graphics: VDG: MC6847
- Input: 48-key "Chiclet"-style keyboard
- Power: 8V AC 1.5A
- Dimensions: 8.5 in × 7 in × 2 in (216 mm × 178 mm × 51 mm)
- Weight: 29.05 oz (824 g)

The TRS-80 MC-10 microcomputer is a lesser-known member of the TRS-80 line of home computers, produced by Tandy Corporation in the early 1980s and sold through their RadioShack and Tandy chains of electronics stores. It was a low-cost alternative to Tandy's own TRS-80 Color Computer to compete with entry-level machines such as the VIC-20 and Sinclair ZX81.

The MC-10 was of value primarily to hobbyists and as an introduction to computer programming. It was not a commercial success and was discontinued only a year after its introduction.

== Description ==
Original box of a MC-10

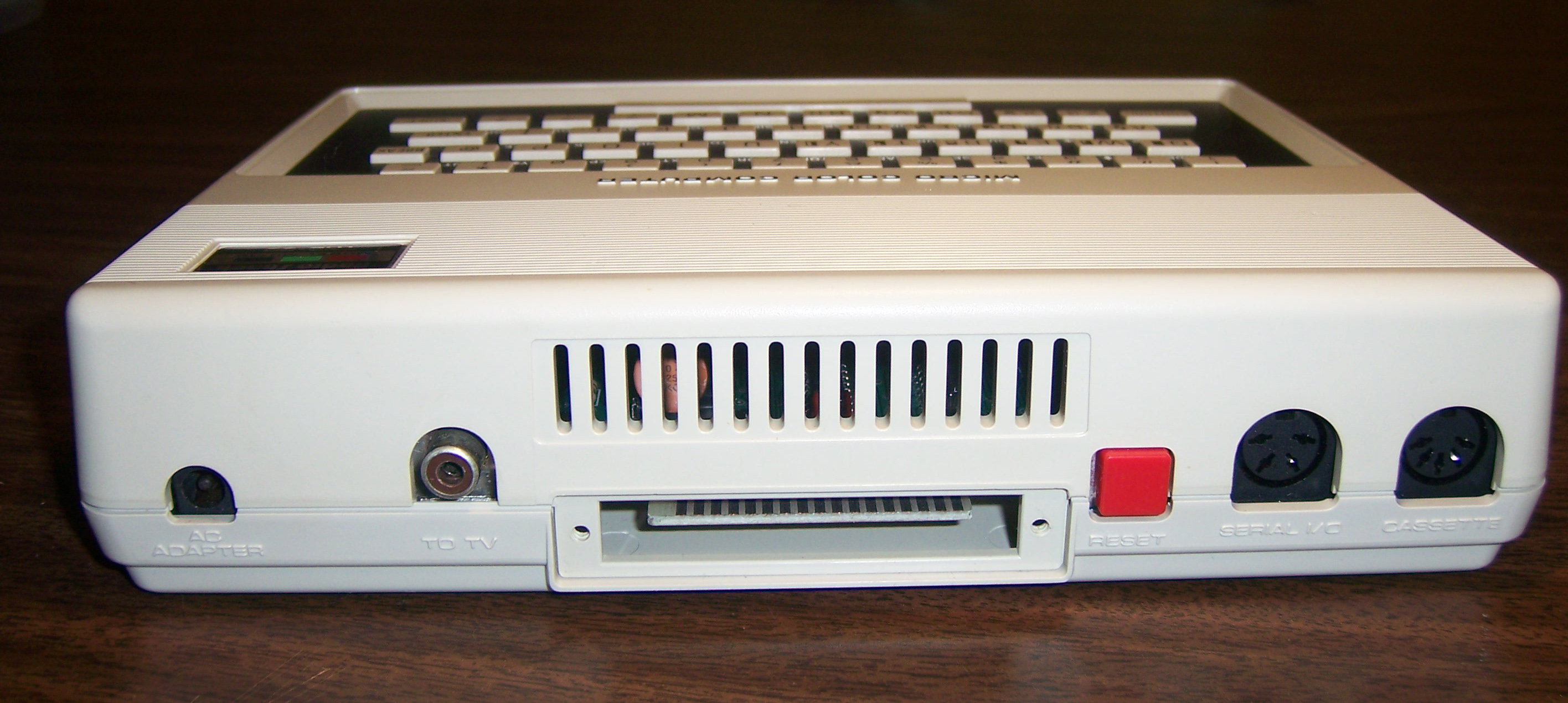
Rear ports on a MC-10

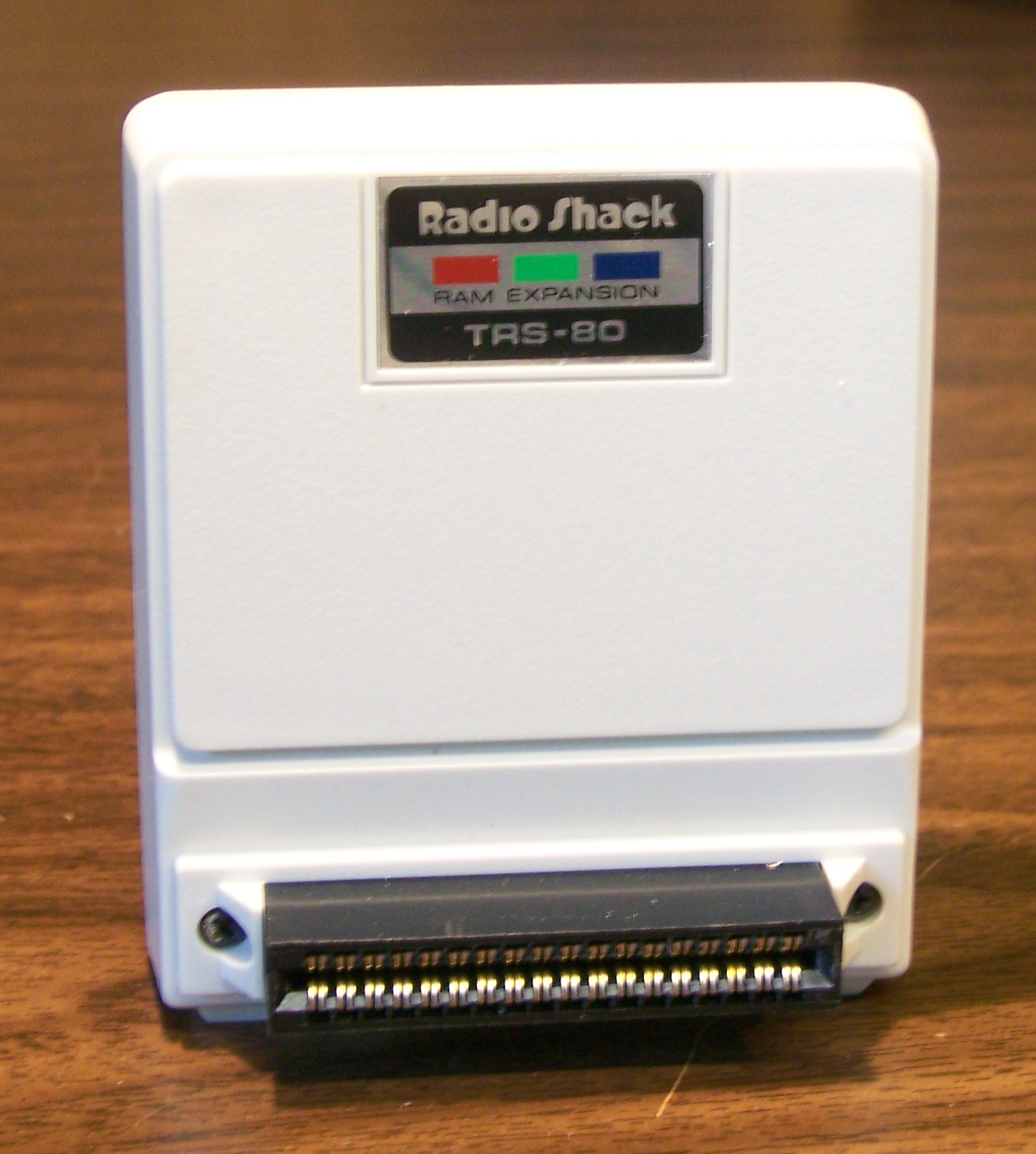
16 KB RAM expansion module

About the size of a hardcover book, the MC-10 has four kilobytes of RAM, a Motorola MC6803 eight-bit microprocessor, a built-in serial port, and graphics capabilities similar to those of the original Color Computer (provided by the same MC6847 video display generator).

The MC-10 includes a BASIC interpreter in ROM and uses regular audio cassettes for bulk storage. Text and graphics are displayed on a television set via a built-in RF modulator. Less common for machines in its class is the integrated RS-232 serial port, which allows the MC-10 to use line printers and modems without additional hardware.

At the time of its release in 1983, the MC-10's specifications were underwhelming (at least for its home market; North America). Disk drives, full-travel keyboards, medium-resolution graphics, and complete 64-kilobyte memory banks were becoming popular features for home computers; the MC-10 offered none of these, severely limiting the functions it could perform and the range of users to whom it could appeal.

The MC-10 was discontinued in 1984, along with the 16 KB memory upgrade and small amount of cassette-based software that had been released for it.

== Specifications ==
- VDG: MC6847
  - Text: 32×16
  - Low-res: 64×32, 8 color (4 bpp)
  - Low-res: 64×48, 2 color (not fully implemented)
  - Low-res: 64×64, 4 color (2 bpp)
  - Med-res: 128×64, 2 color (1 bpp)
  - Med-res: 128×64, 4 color (2 bpp)
  - Med-hi: 128×96, 2 color (1 bpp)
  - Med-hi: 128×96, 4 color (2 bpp)
  - Hi-res: 128×192, 2 color (1 bpp)
  - Hi-res: 128×192, 4 color (2 bpp) (partially supported, insufficient video RAM)
  - Hi-res: 256×192, 2 color (1 bpp) (partially supported, insufficient video RAM)
- I/O Ports:
  - RS-232C serial interface (300-9600 baud; 600 baud from BASIC)
  - Cassette interface (1500 baud)
  - Internal RF modulator
  - Memory expansion interface

Although the memory expansion interface connected directly to the CPU bus and could have been used for many applications, the edge connector involved had an unusual number of pins and was difficult to obtain.

The RS-232C serial interface had extremely limited usefulness. Although the 6803 CPU conveniently includes a built-in UART, it was left unconnected and did not assist the RS-232C interface in any manner. In part, this is because a single 3.58 MHz TV color burst crystal is used to generate video and clock the CPU, and this clock rate could not be divided by an integer to obtain any standard baud rate for the UART. As a result, programs have to shift bits individually into and out of the RS-232C interface, a mode of operation that entails atypical and especially critical timing requirements.

The cassette interface has similar difficulties, plus a few. Although Micro Color Basic includes an undocumented CLOADM command for loading machine-language programs and an undocumented VARPTR function for manipulating variables as memory, there is no corresponding CSAVEM command (documented or otherwise) to permit machine language programs to be saved to tape.

== Software ==
A limited amount of software was available on cassette for the MC-10, including Lunar Lander, Checkers, and a machine-language pinball program. However, as most programs written in Basic for other TRS-80 models were compatible with the MC-10, many books with BASIC programs were available for the user who was willing to type in the code.

== Games ==
There are 32 games on this list.for TRS-80 MC-10 and Matra Alice

Title	Publisher	Release year
Al* Berthe	E.H. Service	1985
Annexion (jeu d'Othello)	Ediciel	1984
Casse-tête dans le Métro	Ediciel	1984
Coloric / La Marelle	Free Game Blot	1985
Crocky	Loriciels	1984
Fringale	E.H. Service	1985
Galaxion (Version de base)	Loriciels	1984
Galixian	Sprites	1984
IAGO	Ediciel	1984
Jeu de Dames	Matra-Hachette	1984
Jeu des 6 Lys	Infogrames	1984
Jouez avec Alice n°1	Ediciel	1984
Jouez avec Alice n°2	Ediciel	1984
Kangourou	Matra Datasystème	1985
La Chenille Infernale	Loriciels	1984
La Course vers l'Enfer	Sprites	1985
La Grenouille à m'Alice	Free Game Blot	1985
Le Sphinx d'Or	Ediciel	1984
Lost World Pinball	Tandy Corp.	1983
Micro Checkers	Tandy Corp.	1983
Micro Games	Tandy Corp.	1983
Monopolic	Free Game Blot	1985
Pepite Story	Sprites	1985
Pillage cosmique	Matra-Hachette	1984
Plan de Vol	E.H. Service	1985
Starex	Sprites	1985
Stock Car	Matra-Hachette	1985
Telerama 1 (Isola / Mor-Quatre)	Vifi Nathan	1984
Telerama 2	Vifi Nathan	1984
Une Affaire en Or	Free Game Blot	1985
World War III / Tank	Free Game Blot	1985
Yams - Poker - Solitaire	Vifi-Nathan	?

== Clone ==
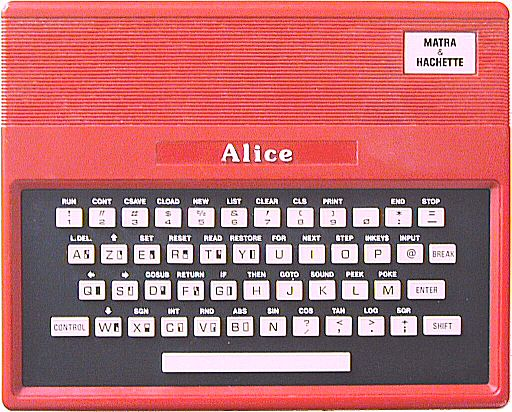
The Matra Alice, a derivative of the original MC-10

A clone of the MC-10, the Alice, was marketed in France through a collaboration among Tandy, Matra and Hachette.
