= Matra Alice =

Home computer marketed in France

Matra & Hachette Ordinateur Alice
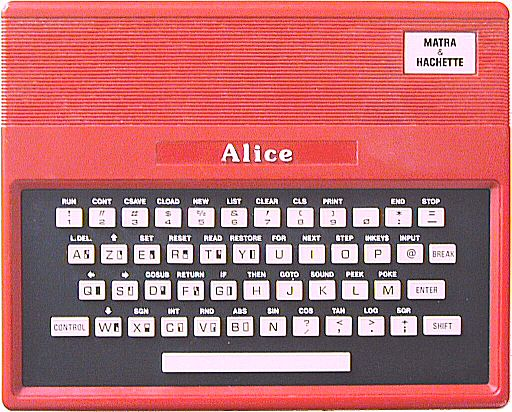
- The Matra Alice
- Manufacturer: Matra and Hachette
- Type: Home computer
- Released: 1983; 43 years ago
- Discontinued: 1983
- Operating system: Microsoft BASIC
- CPU: Motorola 6803 @ 0.89 MHz
- Memory: 4 KiB on-board
- Display: Péritel video output; 32 × 16 or 64 × 32 with 8 colors, 160 × 125 with 4 colors (with expanded RAM)
- Graphics: Motorola 6847
- Sound: 1 channel, 5 octaves
- Input: Cassette interface
- Connectivity: RS-232C serial interface
- Backward compatibility: TRS-80 MC-10

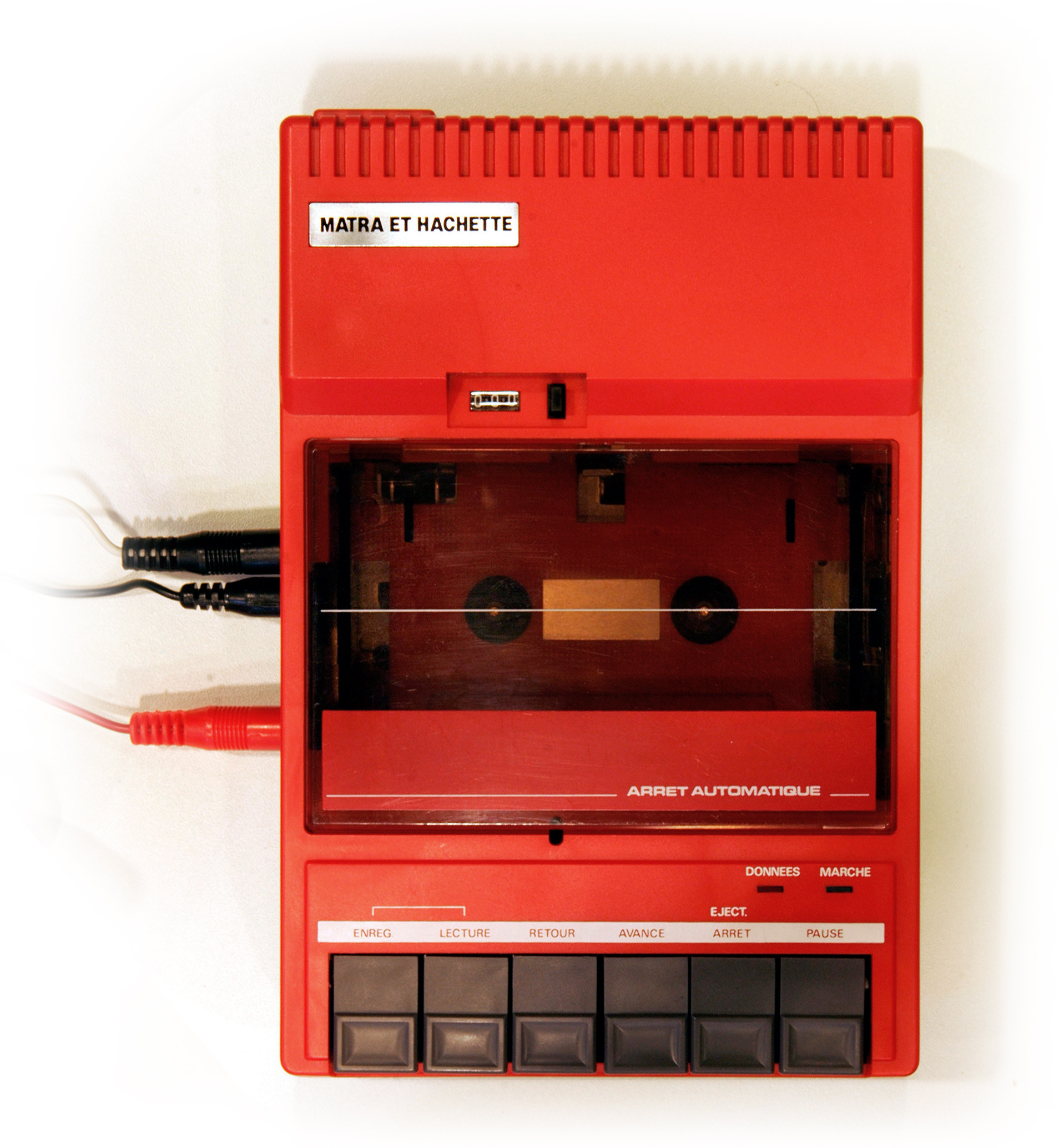
The colour-coordinated data recorder for the Alice

The Matra & Hachette Ordinateur Alice is a home computer sold in France beginning in 1983. It was a clone of the TRS-80 MC-10, produced through a collaboration between Matra and Hachette in France and Tandy Corporation in the United States.

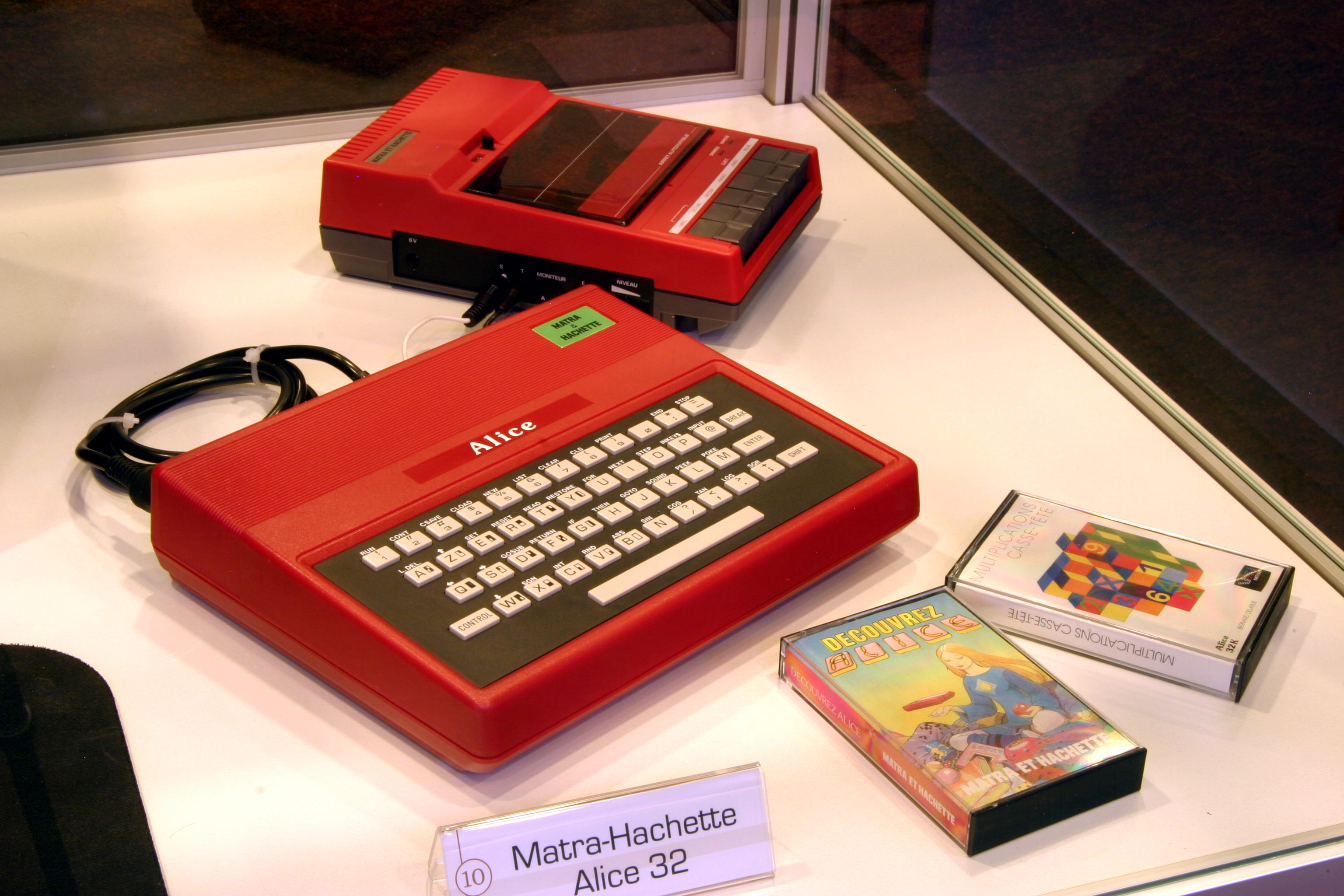
Alice 32 and cassette deck

The Alice is distinguished by its bright red casing. Functionally, it is equivalent to the MC-10, with a Péritel (SCART) connector replacing the RF modulator for video output.

The Alice never became a popular computer in its home country. It tried to invade schools by being part of the country's Plan Informatique pour Tous ("Information technology for everyone") programme, but Thomson won the whole deal. Fewer than 50 games were released for the system.

The original model had 4 KB of RAM and used a Motorola 6847 video display generator chip, as used in the Dragon 32 and Acorn Atom among others.

At least three emulators for the system exist.

== Specifications ==
The machine is similar to the TRS-80 MC-10, with the following specifications:

- CPU: Motorola 6803 at 0.89 MHz
- RAM: 4 KiB on-board, expandable to 20 KiB with a plug-in memory module
- ROM: 8 KiB (Microsoft BASIC)
- I/O Ports:
  - RS-232C serial interface
  - Cassette interface
  - Péritel video output
  - Expansion interface
- AZERTY keyboard layout
- Display: Motorola 6847, 32 × 16 or 64 × 32 with 8 colors, 160 × 125 with 4 colors (with expanded RAM)
- Sound: 1 channel, 5 octaves

== Successor Models ==
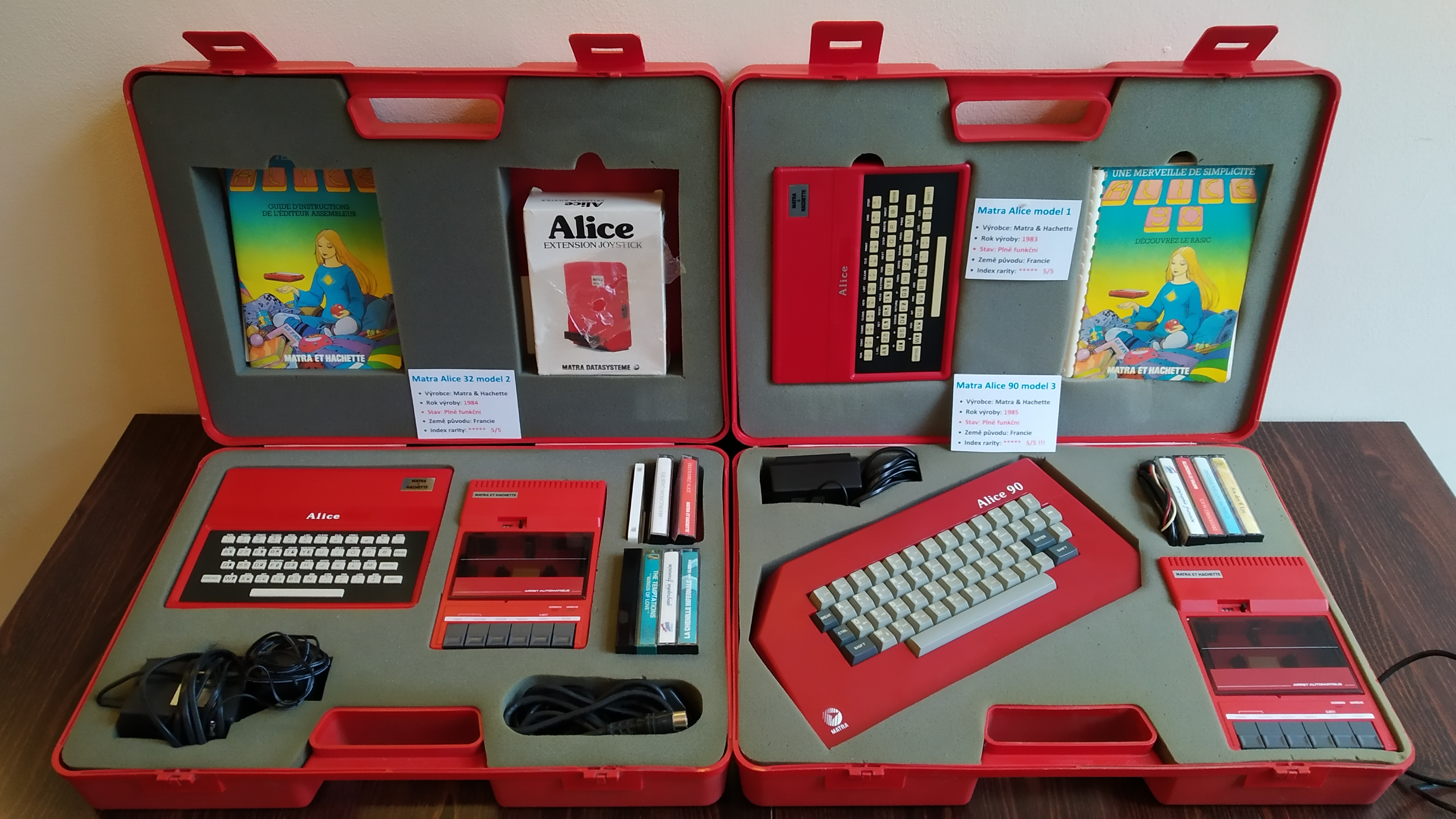
Matra Alice, Matra Alice 32, Matra Alice 90

Matra later released two successor models:

- The Matra Alice 32 released in 1983 shared the case style of the original, but was a different computer inside, due to using the EF9345 video chip. The Alice 32 had 8 kilobytes of main RAM, 8 kilobytes of dedicated video RAM, and 16 kilobytes ROM (the ROM incorporated an assembler). The CPU was clocked at 1 MHz. Higher resolution graphic modes included 320 × 192 with 16 colors from a 256 color palette.
- The Matra Alice 90 released in late 1984 was an upgrade to the Alice 32, which featured 32 kilobytes of RAM and a full-size case and keyboard. Its video cable included video-in, so EF9345 graphics could be overlaid onto the input video.
- The Matra Alice 8000 released in 1985 was a more powerful machine with two CPUs, a 6803 at 4,9152MHz and a Intel 8088. It had 64 kB of RAM.

The Thomson EF9345 video chip in the Matra Alice 32/90 was capable of displaying 8 colors, 128 alphanumeric characters, and 128 semi-graphic characters with a semigraphic mode and 40- and 80-column text modes. It could address up to 16 KiB of dedicated VRAM although the Alice 32 and 90 only included 8 KiB. The 32x16 semigraphic mode of the original Alice was simulated in software by the Alice 32/90 system ROM.
