= Philips VG5000 =

Home computer introduced in 1984

VG5000μ
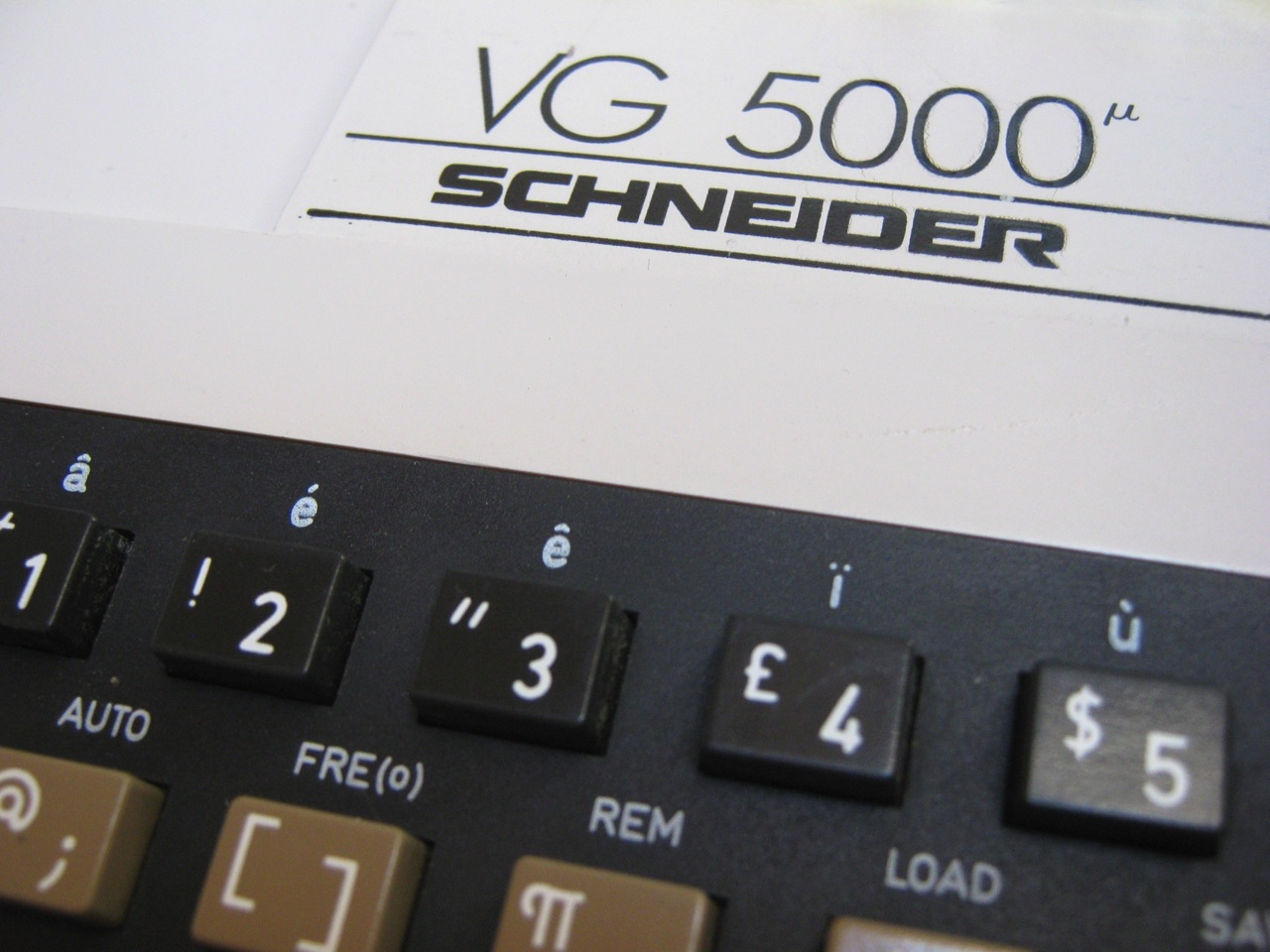
- Developer: Philips
- Manufacturer: Radiotechnique (RTS)
- Type: Home computer
- Generation: 8-bit
- Released: France: 1 October 1984; 42 years ago
- Lifespan: 1984-1986
- Introductory price: 1990 FF
- Discontinued: 1986
- Units sold: 300000 in 1984
- Operating system: VG5000 BASIC
- CPU: Z80 @ 4 MHz
- Memory: 24 KB RAM, 18KB ROM
- Removable storage: Cassette tape
- Display: Semigraphics (equivalent resolution of 320x250), 8 colors
- Graphics: Thomson EF9345
- Sound: 1 voice, 5 octave range
- Language: Logo

The VG5000μ is a computer created by Philips in 1984. It was manufactured in Le Mans by Radiotechnique (RTS) and marketed under the Philips, Radiola and Schneider brands.

Not compatible with any other machines, it offered VG5000 BASIC (derived from Microsoft BASIC-80) as the operating system upon boot, with Logo available on cartridge.

Graphic ability was limited to a semigraphic symbol display, with the equivalent resolution of 320 x 250 pixels in 8 colors.

It had some hardware compatibility with the Philips VG 8000, such as power supply connectors, cassette player interface and cartridges.

== History ==
Aimed at schools, it was unsuccessful and production ended in 1986. 300 000 units were sold in 1984 according to an internal Philips report, with 500 000 predicted for 1985. There are about forty games available for the system.

As of 2022, enthusiasts remain active in developing new homebrew software and emulators for the system.

=== Peripherals ===
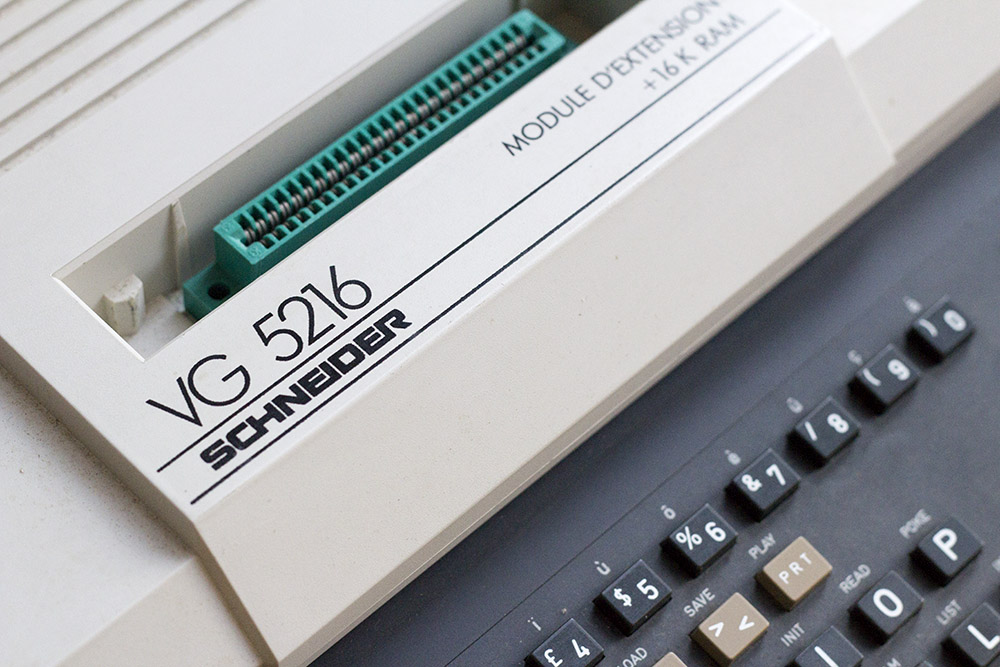
VG5216: 16KB RAM memory expansion with joystick and printer ports

Several peripherals were developed to support the VG5000μ operation:

- VY0030: cassette player
- VG5200: joystick interface
- VU0001: joystick (see Magnavox Odyssey 2)
- VU0011: RF modulator
- VU0022: power supply
- VG5216: 16KB RAM memory expansion with joystick and printer ports
- VU0031: 16KB RAM memory expansion
- VW0010: 40 column printer
- VW0020: 80 column printer
- VW0030: 80 column printer

== Specifications ==
- Boot screen with VG5000 BASIC
  Zilog Z80A processor running at 4 MHz
- RAM: 24KB, including 16KB of system memory (expandable to 48KB) and 8KB of dedicated memory for the video processor
- ROM: 18KB, including 16KB containing the VG5000 BASIC (derived from Microsoft BASIC-80) and 2KB of character bitmaps built into the video processor
- Video processor: SGS Thomson EF9345P
- Graphics: semigraphics based on 8 × 10 pixel characters (equivalent to 320 × 250 pixels) in 8 colors
- Sound: 1 voice, 5 octave range
- Keyboard: Built-in 63 keys AZERTY keyboard with BASIC keywords
- Ports: DIN5 cassette player connector (1200/2400 baud), DIN8 SCART connector
- Expansion: 2×25 pins bus connector

== List of video games ==
There are 33 commercial video games for Philips VG5000.

Title	Release year	Publisher
Backgammon	1984	Philips
Bris de Glace	1984	Philips
Citadelle	1984	Philips
Divertissements	1984	Philips
Football	1984	Philips
Glouton	1984	Philips
Hélicoptère	1984	Philips
La Carotte Malicieuse	1985	VIFI-Nathan
La Moto Infernale	1984	Philips
La Pierre Philosophale Chapter 1 - La Pierre Philosophale	198?	Elite Diffusion
La Pierre Philosophale Chapter 2 - La Clef de l'Ile	198?	Elite Diffusion
La Pierre Philosophale Chapter 3 - La Porte du Jardin des Hesperides	198?	Elite Diffusion
La Pierre Philosophale Chapter 4 - La Porte des Gnomes	198?	Elite Diffusion
La Pierre Philosophale Chapter 5 - La Porte des Pieuvres	198?	Elite Diffusion
La Pierre Philosophale Chapter 6 - La Porte du Harpie	198?	Elite Diffusion
La Pierre Philosophale Chapter 7 - La Porte du Gouffre	198?	Elite Diffusion
L'abeille	1984	Philips
Le Fou Volant	1984	Philips
Le Labyrinthe et la Princesse	1985	Edisoft, Loriciels
Le monstre	1984	Philips
Mes Premiers Mots Croises Vol. 1 - Francais-Vocabulaire	1985	VIFI-Nathan
Mes Premiers Mots Croises Vol. 2 - Francais-Vocabulaire	1985	VIFI-Nathan
Micros Jeux Cocktails de Jeux	1985	VIFI-Nathan
Mission Omega	1984	Philips
Monkey Academy	1984	Philips
Objectif Delta	1984	Philips
Preterite Star	1985	Belin
Reversis	1984	Philips
Simulateur de Vol	1984	Philips
Staroc	1984	Philips
Tortues	1984	Philips
US Rallye	1984	Philips
Viking	1984	Philips
