= David L. Jones (video blogger) =

Australian video blogger

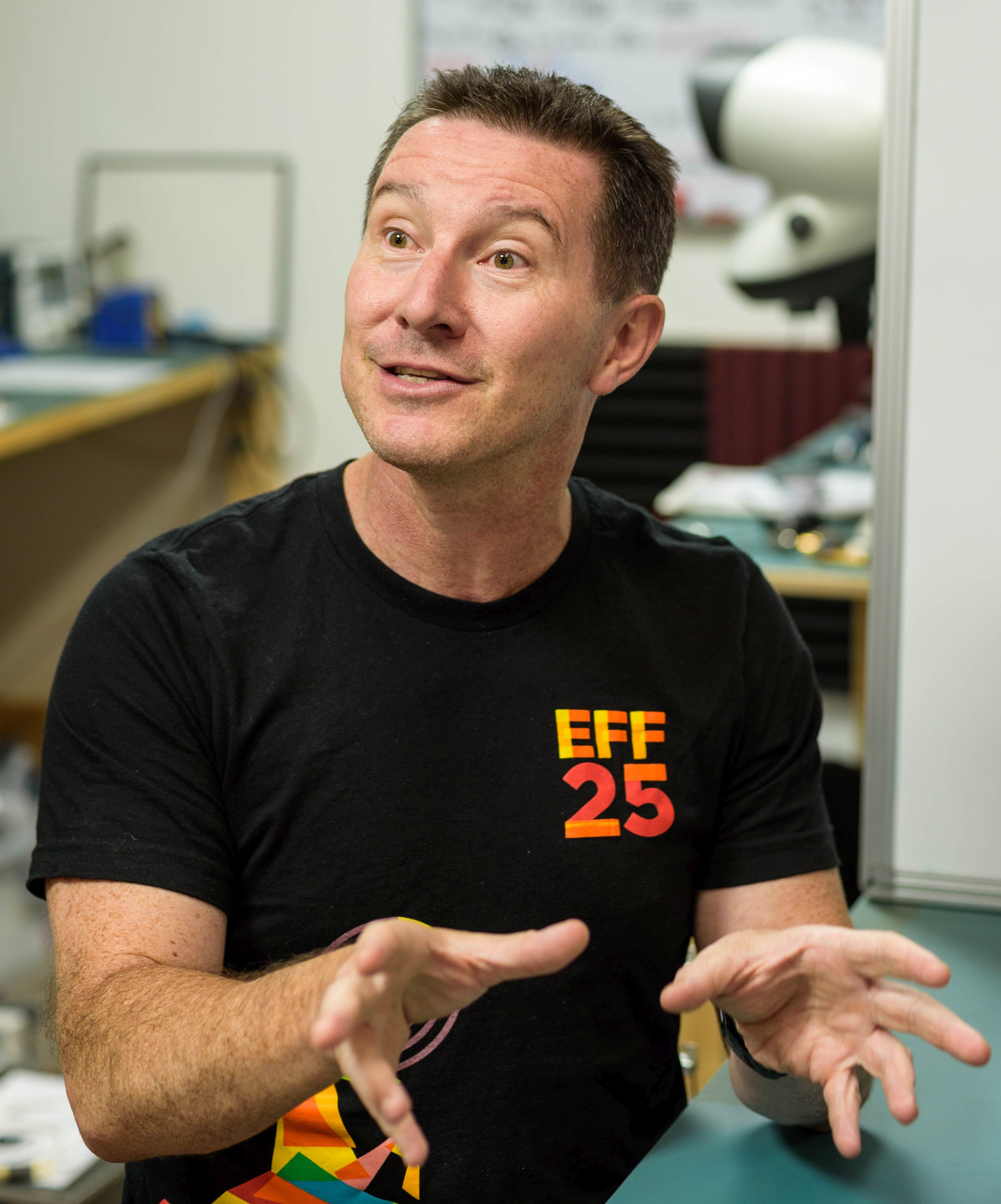
- David L. Jones in his electronics lab in January 2016
- Other names: Dave Jones; "The Crazy Aussie Bloke"
- Occupation: Video blogger

YouTube information
- Channel: EEVBlog
- Years active: 2009–present
- Genre: Video blog
- Subscribers: 1 Million
- Views: 220 Million
- Last updated: 14 August 2026
- Website: www.eevblog.com

David L. Jones is an Australian video blogger. He is the founder and host of EEVBlog (Electronics Engineering Video Blog), a blog and YouTube channel targeting electronics engineers, hobbyists, hackers, and makers. His content has been described as a combination of "in-depth equipment reviews and crazy antics".

== Life ==
Before becoming a full-time blogger, Jones worked on FPGA boards for the EDA company Altium.

According to Jones, he began publishing electronic design project plans in electronics DIY magazines like Electronics Australia in the 1980s. In recent years, several of his project articles appeared in Silicon Chip.

Jones is also the founder and co-host of The Amp Hour, an electronics engineering radio show and podcast.

== EEVBlog ==
Jones' EEVBlog YouTube channel was created on 4 April 2009. The channel features in-depth equipment reviews and electronics commentaries. Jones has posted over 1000 episodes.

== Batteriser incident ==
In a mid-2015 video, Jones disputed the claims of an unreleased battery life extender called Batteriser (later called Batteroo Boost after a lawsuit by Energizer). Batteroo, the company behind the product, disputed the arguments put forth by Jones and others, and published a number of demonstration videos in response. In the wake of Jones' video about Batteriser, his video was "disliked" by a torrent of IP addresses located in Vietnam. Other bloggers with related videos experienced similar activity from addresses in Vietnam. The bloggers involved have suspected that either a click farm in Vietnam was engaged to harm the reputations of those attacking the claims about the product, or that a single computer with many fake or stolen YouTube accounts utilized proxied IP addresses to cover its tracks. Due to the anonymous nature of the attacks, it remains unknown who was responsible.
