= Dick Smith Super-80 Computer =

1981 Australian kit computer

Super-80
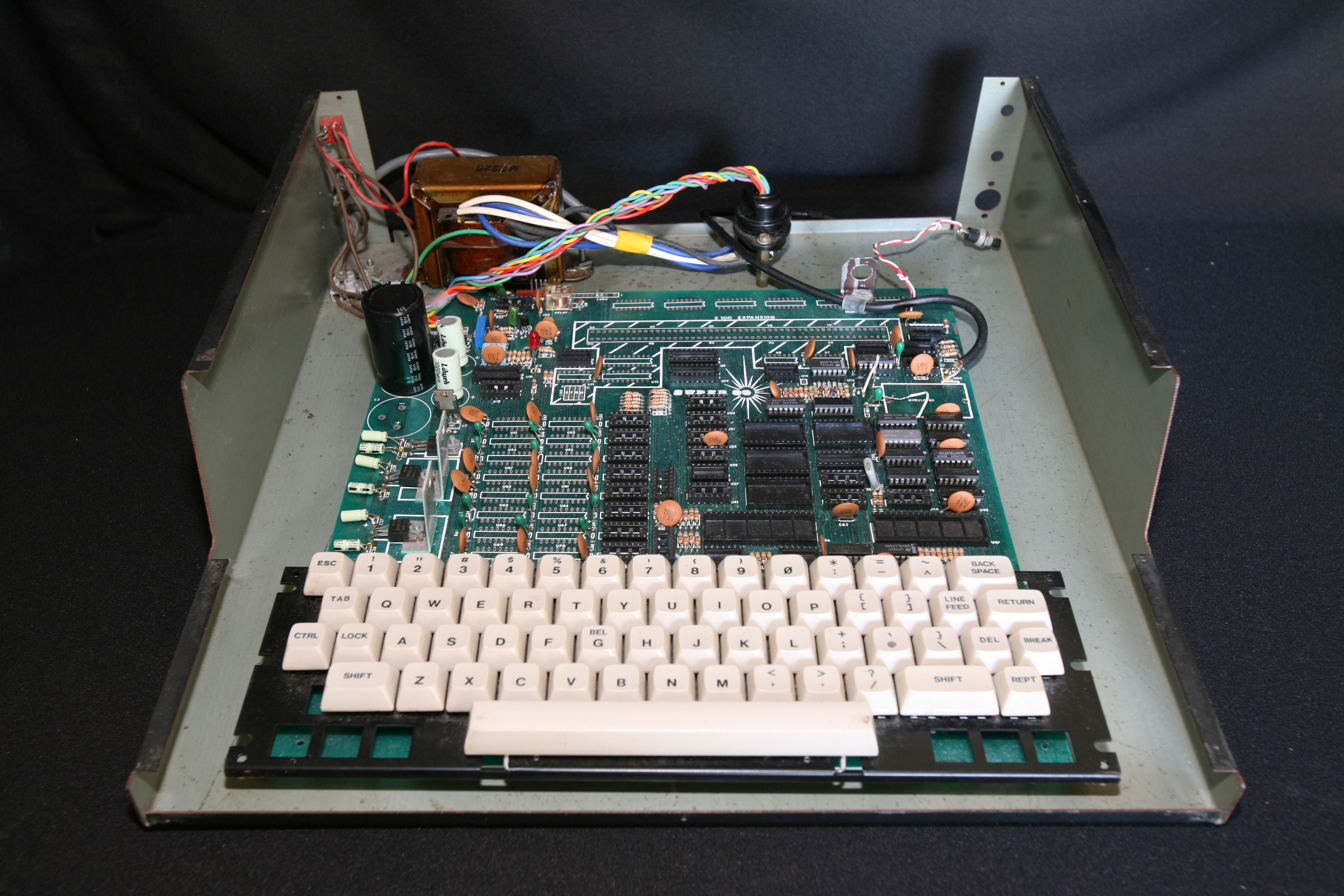
- Super-80 kit computer
- Developer: Electronics Australia magazine Dick Smith Electronics
- Manufacturer: Dick Smith Electronics
- Released: October 1981; 44 years ago
- Introductory price: "short form" kit A$289.50
- Units sold: 2000+
- Operating system: machine code monitor program in ROM
- CPU: Zilog Z80 @ 2 MHz
- Memory: 16kB (maximum 48kB) RAM, 2kB (maximum 12kB) ROM
- Storage: Cassette Tape (300 Baud, Kansas City Standard)
- Display: Monochrome, 32 × 16 Characters, Upper Case Only

The Dick Smith Super-80 was a Zilog Z80 based kit computer developed as a joint venture between Electronics Australia magazine and Dick Smith Electronics.

It was presented as a series of construction articles in Electronics Australia magazine's August, September and October 1981 issues.

Electronics Australia had published a number of computer projects before the Super-80, including the EDUC-8 in 1974, the Mini Scamp and the DREAM 6800 Video Computer.

The computer was sold as a "short form" kit for A$ 289.50. For this, the purchaser received the computer PCB, an assembly manual (a copy of the construction articles from Electronics Australia) and basic components, including 16kB of RAM and a 2kB EPROM containing a machine code monitor program. The technical manual and power transformer were sold separately, as were a kit of I.C. sockets, a BASIC interpreter program and from mid-1982 onwards, a metal case to house the computer.

The computer proved to be a popular construction project, with an advertisement in November 1982 claiming: "Over 2000 sold."

The popularity of the Super-80 led to a small industry growing up around addressing the shortcomings of the original computer - especially the black and white, 32 × 16 character, upper case only video display.

The original name of the computer was "Nova-80", but it was changed at the last minute to avoid "possible legal ramifications".

== Specifications ==
- CPU: Zilog Z80
- Clock Speed: 2 MHz
- Expansion: S-100 Bus Slot (Optional)
- Keyboard: 60 Key
- Mass Storage: Cassette Tape (300 Baud, Kansas City Standard)
- RAM: 16kB (maximum 48kB)
- ROM: 2kB (maximum 12kB)
- Sound: None
- Video Display: Monochrome, 32 × 16 Characters, Upper Case Only

== Technical description ==
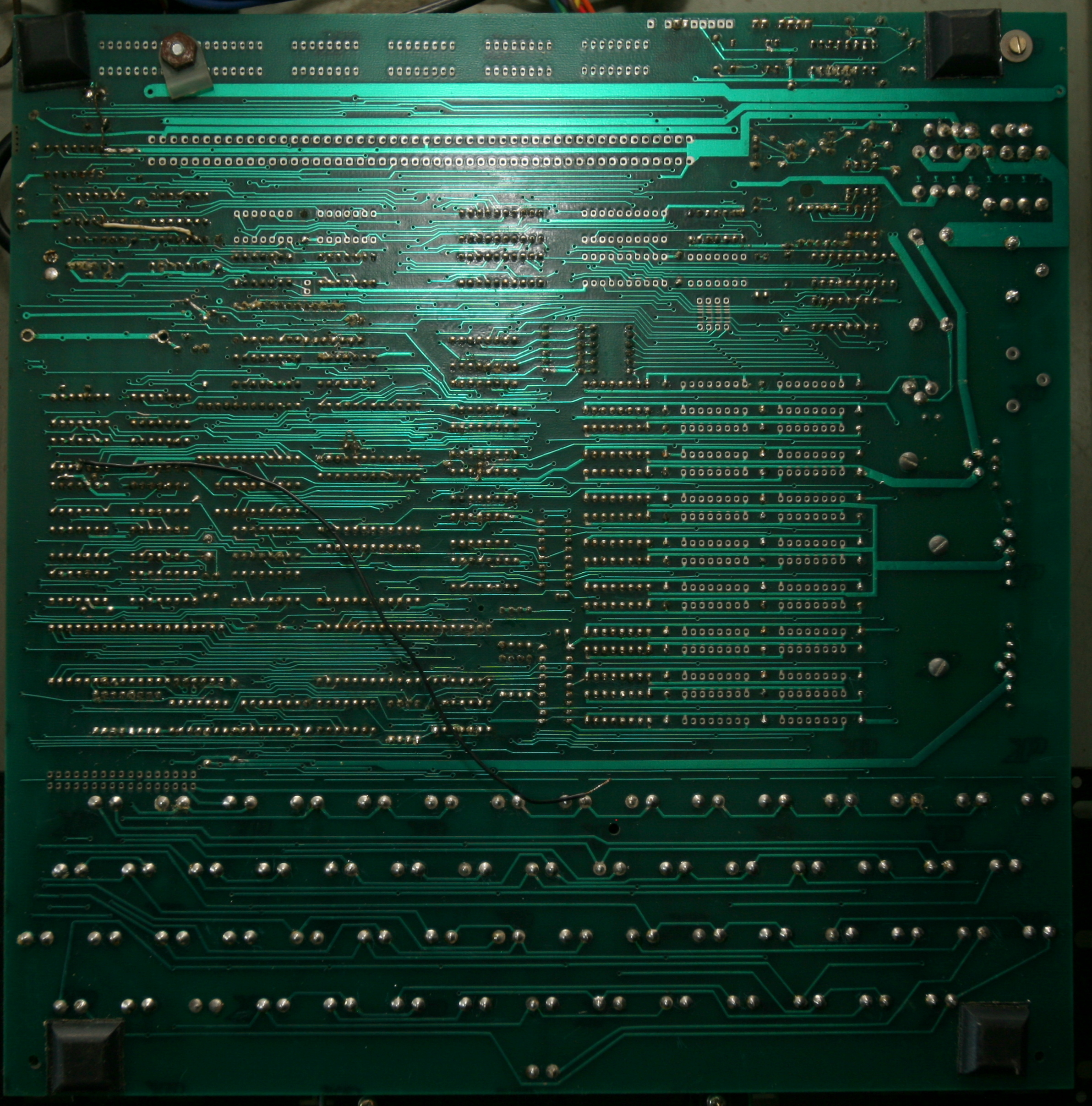
Super-80 computer logic board (reverse side)

The Super-80 was based on the Zilog Z80 8-bit microprocessor. As standard, it had 16 kB of dynamic RAM in the form of eight 4116 RAM chips. RAM could be expanded to 32 kB or 48 kB through the addition of rows of eight 4116 RAM chips.

The computer was assembled on a single double-sided printed circuit board. The board was supplied in a light cardboard sleeve that appeared to be an LP record sleeve, having the words "Dick Smith Super 80 Microcomputer Kit Printed Circuit Board" and the part number "Cat H-8402" printed along the spine.

To keep the price of the computer and the component count down, a novel technique was used to implement the video display. Instead of an expensive video display controller chip with dedicated memory, the Super-80 used discrete TTL logic to implement the video display and 512 bytes of system RAM was shared between the video display and the CPU. Fifty times per second, the CPU was turned off for around 10 ms by asserting the Z80 BUSREQ (DMA) pin. The video display circuitry would then read from the shared RAM while it refreshed the image on the screen. In addition to a 50% degradation in processor performance, this meant that it was not possible to perform any accurate timing in software, since the programmer had no control over when the next video display refresh cycle would occur. The video display could be switched off under software control for greater processing speed, or when accurate software timing was required. The most common situation in which that occurred was when the built-in cassette interface was being used. The location of the 512 bytes of video memory was normally at the top of the available RAM, but could be changed by writing to an I/O port.

The keyboard was part of the main computer PCB, but before assembly, the constructor could opt to cut the keyboard section of the printed circuit board off and connect it to the main board with ribbon cable. The keyboard was wired as an 8 × 8 matrix and connected to the computer via the two 8-bit ports of a Z80 PIO chip. Pressing the keys <CTRL>, <C> and <4> at the same time generated an interrupt that would perform a "warm start" of the monitor program. The keyboard 'read' routine supplied in ROM was "negative edge triggered" and would block while a key was down. As a result, most action games incorporated their own keyboard driver.

The standard computer had no serial or parallel I/O as such, relying on the optional S-100 bus interface for I/O and expansion. A 10-pin connector at the back of the board was labeled "PORT" and had power, as well as a pair of digital outputs and two available digital input lines. The connector was for a future RS-232 / 20 mA current loop serial interface, but that was never implemented.

Mass storage was available in the form of a cassette tape interface running at 300 baud. Accessing the cassette interface required the video display to be switched off, so an LED was provided to show activity during a tape load or save operation. The LED would change state each time a 256-byte block of data was successfully transferred.

The Z80 interrupt line was connected to the keyboard PIO and the "Non Maskable Interrupt" line was not connected.

== Software ==
The Super-80 came with a 2kB machine code monitor program in ROM.

A BASIC interpreter could be purchased either on cassette tape or on a set of three 4kB EPROMs. The first 4kB BASIC EPROM replaced the 2kB monitor EPROM supplied with the computer and contained the first 2kB of BASIC, plus the monitor program. The BASIC interpreter was based on Tiny BASIC rewritten and modified by Ron Harris.

In its November 1981 edition (p93), Electronics Australia announced a programming competition with the chance to win one of two dot matrix printers. The magazine later compiled the better programs submitted by readers into a book called Software for the Super-80 Computer.

== Accessories and options ==
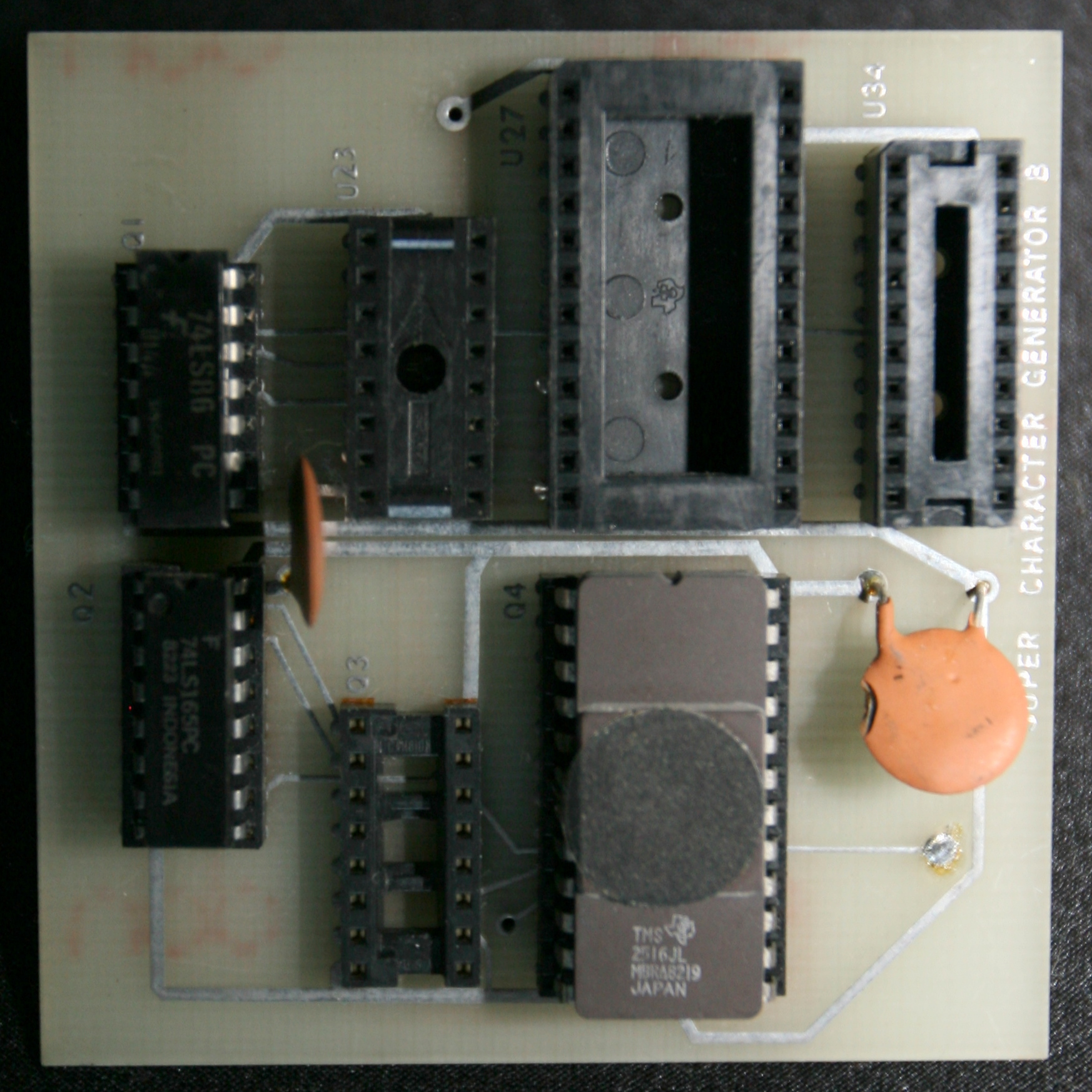
Super character generator board for the Super-80 computer

- B-3600 Super-80 Technical Manual
- B-3602 Super-80 BASIC Handbook
- H-3200 Metal Case
- K-3602 BASIC Interpreter on Cassette Tape
- K-3603 I.C. Socket Kit
- K-3604 BASIC Interpreter in EPROM
- K-3606 S-100 Expansion Unit
- K-3607 Lower Case Character Generator

== Modifications ==
Many Super-80 owners chose to modify their machines to address the limitations of the original machine.

The El Graphix kit added the ability to display lower case characters and "chunky" graphics.

The Printer Interface was an S-100 Bus card giving the Super-80 a Centronics parallel printer port.

The VDU Expansion Board (VDUEB) was an enhanced video display board for the Super-80 developed by Microcomputer Engineering (MCE). The VDUEB gave the Super-80 an 80×25 video display with limited graphics capabilities. It was based on a 6845 CRTC I.C. and had its own 2kB of video RAM and 2kB of character generator RAM. Installation of the VDUEB board was a one-way process, as it required major modifications to the Super-80 printed circuit board including cutting of tracks and soldering in many wire links between various parts of the board. The VDUEB was then connected via three I.C. sockets formerly occupied by the original video display circuitry. Removal of the original DMA based video display effectively doubled the performance of the computer, since the CPU was no longer being disabled 50 times per second for video display refreshes. The board gave the Super-80 similar video display capabilities to the Applied Technology MicroBee computer, released about six months after the Super-80. This led to many MicroBee games being ported to the VDUEB equipped Super-80. The VDUEB proved to be a popular modification, with a users' group forming for owners of VDUEB equipped computers - The "Super-80 VDUEB Users' Club".

The Universal Floppy Disk Controller (UFDC) was an add-on floppy disk interface developed by Microcomputer Engineering (MCE). The UFDC was based on the Western Digital WD2793 floppy disk controller chip and had a Z80 DMA controller on board. The most popular disk format was 5 1/4" (133 mm) 80 track, double sided, double density using a Mitsubishi floppy drive mechanism. This gave a formatted disk capacity of 800kB. The UFDC's use of DMA required the VDUEB upgrade to be present. To install the disk controller, the Z80 CPU was removed from the main computer board and installed on the UFDC board. The UFDC then piggybacked on the socket vacated by the CPU. This meant that in theory, the UFDC could be used with almost any Z80 based system, provided there was enough physical space above the CPU. The UFDC used a primitive track based disk operating system called "Super-80 DOS", however a CP/M BIOS later became available.

The MXB-1 Memory Expansion Board was designed by a member of the VDUEB Users' Club. The MXB-1 contained space for extra EPROMs, an optional battery backed real time clock, a centronics compatible printer interface and address decoding for up to 192kB of RAM. The extra RAM was installed by replacing the standard 4116 16k × 1 bit RAM chips with 4164 64k × 1 bit RAM chips. The CPU's 64kB address limit was worked around through bank switching. The MXB-1 was mostly of benefit to users running the CP/M disk operating system, since CP/M could then have a full 64kB of RAM for programs, with up to 128kB being used as a small RAM disk.

The El Graphix "X-RAM" board provided up to 16K of battery backed CMOS RAM or EPROM. Several X-RAM boards could be piggybacked allowing each to be port selected as independent 16K banks of memory. This memory took the form of 8 x 2K 24pin sockets which accepted either 2016 CMOS RAM or 2716 EPROMS. As the system ROM shared part of the address range taken up by the X-RAM board the system ROM could be copied into CMOS RAM on the fly and modified as required to actively add or modify custom functions into the operating system.

== See also ==
- Dick Smith System 80, a pre-built near-clone of the Tandy TRS-80 Model I
