= VTech Laser 200 =

8-bit home computer released in 1983

VTech Laser 200 & Laser 210
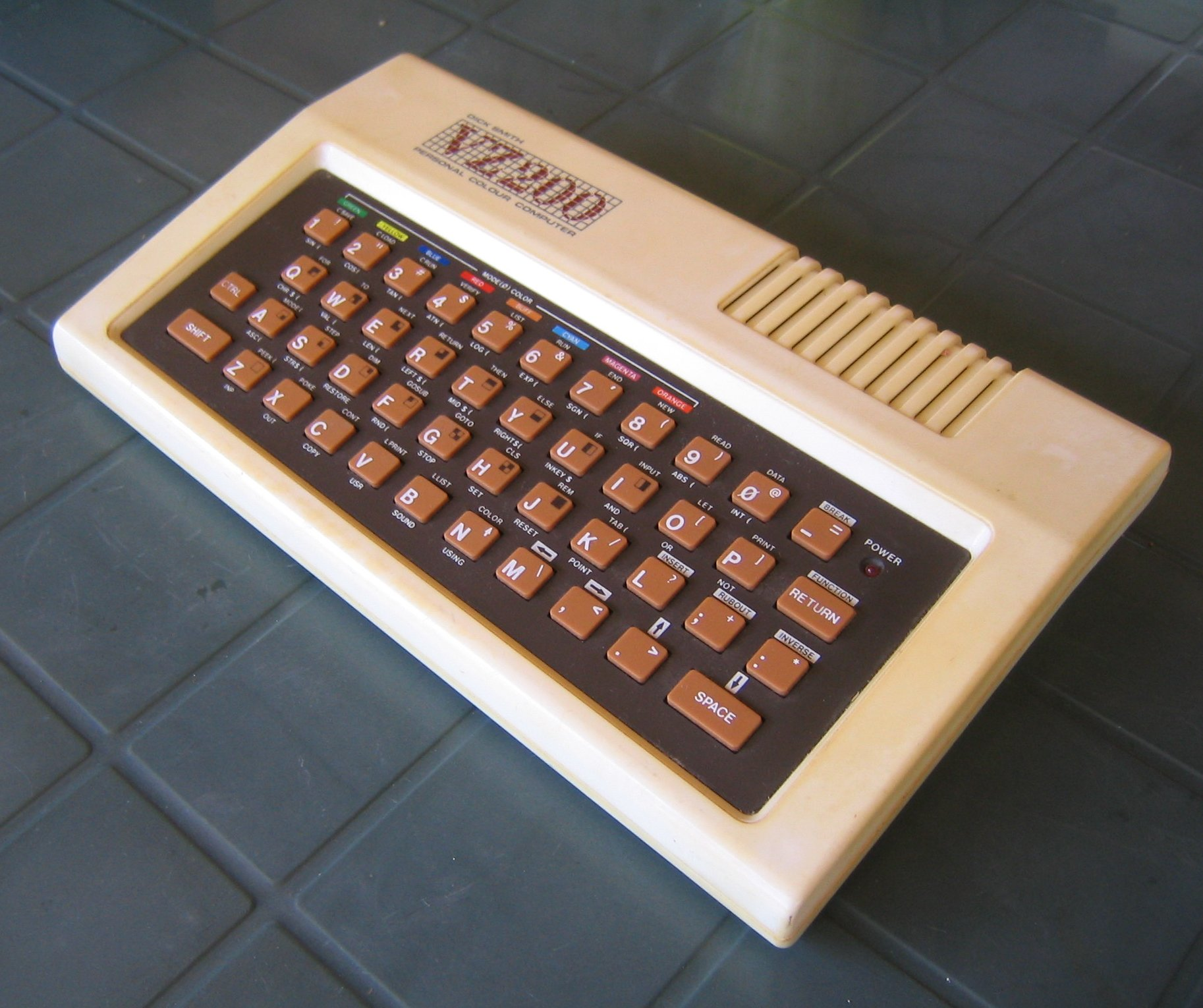
- The VTech Laser 210, rebadged as a Dick Smith VZ200
- Manufacturer: Video Technology
- Type: Personal computer
- Released: November 1983; 42 years ago
- Lifespan: 1983-1985, 2 years
- Introductory price: US$99 (equivalent to $320 in 2025) £98 (equivalent to £330 in 2025) (Note: While a £98 price was quoted in reviews of the Texet TX8000-badged version, it is unclear how many - if any - made it into shops under that name. It was later relaunched as the "Laser 200" by another distributor for the lower price of £70 (equivalent to £240 in 2025).); A$200 (equivalent to $720 in 2022)
- Discontinued: 1985; 41 years ago
- Units sold: 200,000 in Australia
- Media: Cassette tape, disk drive
- Operating system: BASIC V2.0
- CPU: Zilog Z80A @ 3.58 MHz
- Memory: 2-22 kB RAM + 2 kB VRAM, 16 kB ROM
- Display: 32×16 (8 colors), 128×64 graphics (2 background, 3 foreground colors)
- Graphics: Motorola 6847 video processor
- Sound: Push-pull piezo speaker
- Input: 45 key keyboard
- Power: 10 volt
- Dimensions: 29 × 17 × 4cm
- Weight: 800g
- Predecessor: VTech Laser 110
- Successor: VTech Laser 310

The Laser 200 and 210 are 8-bit home computers manufactured by Video Technology (VTech) and released in 1983. They were aimed at the entry-level market and first-time users.

The machine ran basic games on cassette such as Hoppy (a version of Frogger), Cosmic Rescue (Scramble), VZ Invaders (Space Invaders), Dawn Patrol (Chopper) and Moon Patrol.

The Laser 200 and 210 and variants were rebadged under numerous different names in various markets, where they met with varying degrees of success. These included the Salora Fellow (mainly in Fennoscandia, particularly Finland), the Seltron 200 in Hungary & Italy, the Smart-Alec Jr. by Dynasty Computer Corporation in Dallas, Texas for the USA, the Texet TX8000 (United Kingdom), the Dick Smith VZ 200 (in Australia & New Zealand), and the VTech VZ 200 (in the United States and Canada).

From late 1984 on, the Laser 200/210 and VZ200 were replaced by an improved model known as the VTech Laser 310 or the Dick Smith VZ 300. This featured a full travel keyboard and 8K ROM software-based Floppy Disk Controller, and was produced until 1989.

VTech also used the "Laser" brand on some otherwise unrelated computers.

== Development ==
Video Technology (VTech) manufactured calculators and LCD pad game toys (similar to Nintendo Game & Watch) at a multi-storey factory in Hong Kong. The Laser 100 and 110 were a development of an earlier monochrome TRS-80 copy, and further development resulted in the Laser 200 and 210 which were similar in terms of architecture to the EACA Colour Genie (itself a TRS-80 derivative) and in terms of specification and pricing to (e.g.) the Mattel Aquarius.

== Distribution, naming and reception by country ==
Released in 1983, the Laser 200 was marketed under various names in numerous countries worldwide. It enjoyed particular success in Australia and New Zealand where it and its successor (the Laser 310) sold in rebadged form via the "Dick Smith" chain for several years.

=== Austria, Hungary and Italy ===
In these countries a variant known as the Seltron 200 was imported in what were likely very small quantities. However, it proved unsuccessful, with reports of unsold machines still on the Hungarian market several years later.

=== Australia and New Zealand ===
==== Dick Smith VZ200 ====
The Laser 200 was distributed throughout these countries via the Dick Smith Electronics chain as the "Dick Smith VZ200" with 8 kB of RAM installed and launching at $200 (equivalent to $720 in 2022). Reviewing it in Australian Personal Computer, Tim Hartnell was highly positive and called it a "great little machine" he thought would "change the face of Australian computing" as well as noting that APC's editor himself had told him "I'm certainly going to buy one". (Both quotes were later used in DSE's advertising.)

Due to their extensive advertising throughout Australia and New Zealand, the VZ200 gained large popularity there.

The "Dick Smith"–badged VZ200 was successful in Australia, where it proved popular as a first computer. A 1984 catalogue reported that over 22,000 units had already sold throughout Australasia, a figure that was later increased to 30,000. In Australia, the VZ200 was bought mostly to learn programming. The VZ200 version of BASIC had more features compared to the Commodore 64 BASIC.

Dick Smith went on to sell the improved Laser 310, rebadged in a similar style as the "Dick Smith VZ300", from 1985. It continued to advertise the VZ300 for $99 as of 1987 until, circa May 1988, a user group reported that it was no longer listed in the latest catalogue and presumed discontinued. (One former VZ developer/publisher and supplier to Dick Smith stated that, circa the early 1990s, they were still selling 100,000 VZ300s a year but were forced to discontinue the model after VTech ceased production in order to concentrate on IBM clones, despite an offer to increase their order.)

=== Canada ===
The machine was sold as the VZ200 in Canada, distributed by Rocelco Inc. Electronics Today International gave it a generally positive review as a beginner's machine, despite criticism of the keyboard.

=== China ===
The Laser 310, a later revision, was one of the first computers to be widely used in homes and primary and secondary schools in China during the 1980s and 1990s. It was also found in Children's Palaces of the time.

=== Finland, Sweden and Scandinavia ===
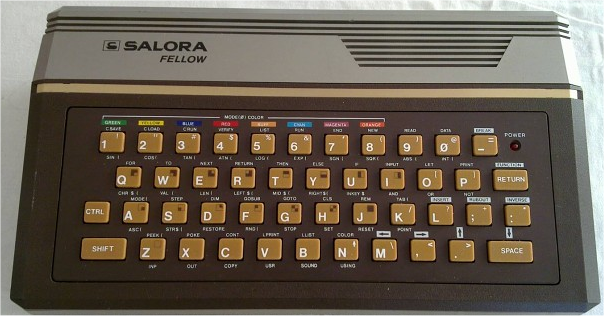
Salora Fellow. Unlike most rebadged versions of the standard Laser 200 and 210, this features a slightly different case, similar to that of the Laser 110.

==== Salora Fellow ====
Sold as the Salora Fellow throughout Finland, Sweden & Scandinavia. These were rebadged Laser 200 computers with 2 kB of user RAM plus 2 kB of video RAM (marketed as 4 kB). The Fellow did not prove to be very successful.

(Salora also sold another VTech computer, the Laser 2001, as the Salora Manager. However, this used the 6502 CPU and a completely different design, so was incompatible with the Z80-based Fellow/Laser 200.)

=== France ===
In France, the Laser 200 was seen at the Micro-Expo exhibition in Paris during June 1983. It was advertised for sale later that year, via mail order from Video Technology themselves, in a version that was compatible with the French SECAM television system. Unlike some of its competitors, this allowed its use, via the aerial socket, with older televisions that did not support Péritel (SCART).

At its launch, it was seen to be an "introductory machine for beginners" and compared to the ZX81, Oric-1 and Matra Alice.

In late 1984, the improved Laser 310 model was released, again in a SECAM-compatible version.

In 1985, Video Technology imported a limited number of VZ-200-branded versions at what was described as an "unbeatable" price (690 F). These models, which were claimed to be sourced via Germany, were PAL/SCART only and did not include SECAM output.

=== Germany ===
The VTech Laser 110, 200, 210 and VTech Laser 310 sold and distributed all throughout Germany by Sanyo. The Laser 110 and VZ200 models sold there both included 4K RAM, whereas the Laser 210 and 310 came with 8K.

In mid to late 1982, the Laser 200 hit the German market via Sanyo. It is only the German Laser 200 units that have its underneath base plates showing the year 1982. All other units outside of Germany show 1983.

"Sanyo Video" advertised both the Laser 110 and the Laser 210, along with peripherals and software that it noted was also suitable for use with the VZ200.

The VZ200 was sold in Germany as the "VTECH VZ200", the "more sophisticated models" as "SANYO VIDEO/LASER XXX". This led to legal action because of the misleading use of the "SANYO" brand name ("SANYO VIDEO"). A friendly agreement was reached with "SANYO" at the time by Video Technology in Hong Kong. Packaging of German LASER 310s were labelled "SANYO VIDEO".

During the early years of the VZ200 and Laser 210, Germany saw a large number of the computers being sold, and many user groups formed. It was interesting to note that the Light Pen was sold in Germany in the early years, and quite a number were privately imported into Australia by Gavin Williamson and Bob Kitch. The light pen was never sold in Australia. The floppy disk drive was marketed and sold throughout Germany during 1984, some time before they were even advertised in Australia (end of 1985). Once again, a number of drive units ended up in Australia long before Dick Smith got on board.

=== United Kingdom ===
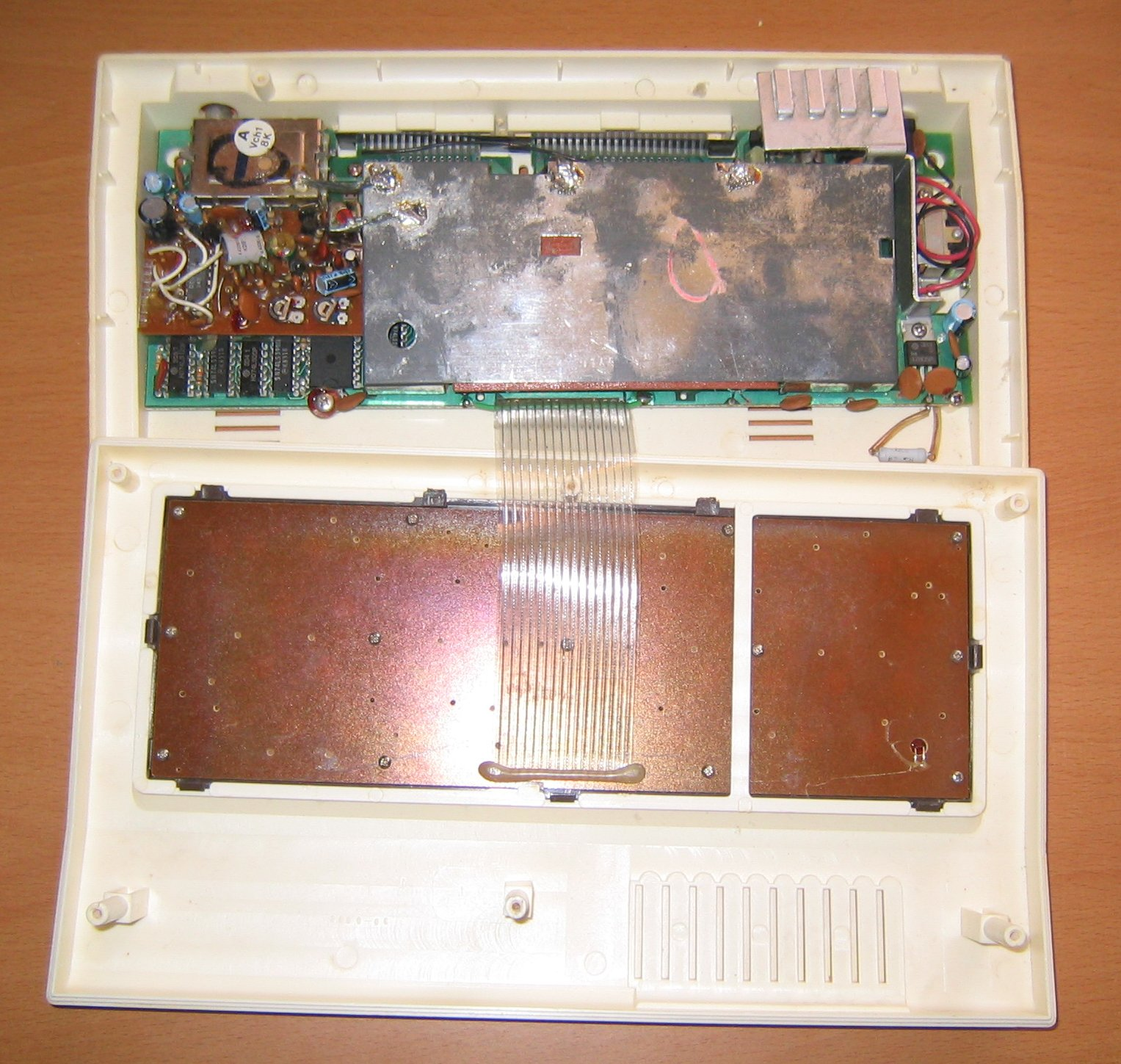
Inside the case of a VZ200

Following a short-lived attempt to distribute it as the rebadged "Texet TX8000", the Laser 200 was later relaunched under its original name in the UK. However, it had little success against established competitors and a glut of similar low-end microcomputers.

==== Texet TX8000 ====
Texet TX8000

Initially it had been agreed that UK-based distributor Texet would have exclusive rights there. Rebadged as the "Texet TX8000", at £98 (equivalent to £333 in 2025), it was described as the cheapest colour computer on the market.

Reviews under the TX8000 name appeared during March and April 1983, where it received a mixed response. (Note: Your Computer was negative overall, judging the £98 Texet unfavourably against 16K versions of the Oric-1 (then £99, albeit in short supply) and ZX Spectrum (£125), criticising it on numerous counts (including internal construction it described as a "mess" and "antique"). It concluded that despite a good range of peripherals and low price, "too many compromises have been made". 'Which Micro?' expressed similar concerns regarding the display and construction, but praised the keyboard. Personal Computer News was more positive despite misgivings, saying it was potentially "a very nice beginner's machine at a reasonable price".) (Review samples also varied between 4 and 8 kB RAM, (Note: Your Computer's machine included 4 kB, whereas Which Micro's (still wearing the 'Video Technology' badge) and Personal Computer News's "pre-production sample" both featured 8 kB.) making Texet's intended retail specification unclear.)

It was claimed in one publication in early April that the TX8000 had been on sale since the end of March. However, it is not clear whether this was verified, (Note: The wording does not make explicit whether the magazine - Personal Computing Today - was simply repeating a claim made by Texet or whether they had time to verify this before they went to press. (The scheduled on-sale date of the May issue was 1 April, so any "end of March" launch would have happened a few days prior at most.) They also humorously implied scepticism as to whether Texet would be able to supply a machine in time for a planned full review in the next issue, but did not explain why.) nor how many, if any, units made it to shops or were actually sold.

In mid-April 1983, after a legal reorganisation at Texet, (Note: The original Texet Ltd. (which whom the agreement had been made) went into receivership and its assets and brand were sold to a new company under different ownership, Texet Sales Ltd.) the future of the TX8000 was "still to be decided" and seen to be in doubt. Following a lack of further activity, the TX8000-branded version was described as having "disappeared almost as quickly as it arrived".

==== Laser 200 via "Computers for All" stores ====
In June 1983, new distributors announced that the "Laser 200"–branded version with 4 kB RAM would be sold for £70 via "Computers for All"–affiliated independent retailers. However, while the new price was significantly lower than Texet's, its largest rival, the 16K Spectrum, had itself since fallen to £99.95. (One review noted that expanding the 4K Laser to that level would effectively eliminate its price advantage.) (Note: The magazine (Personal Computer News) also expressed reservations about software support, but concluded that the Laser was a "colour ZX81" that "was a possibility" which would appeal primarily to those driven by price or who did not want to risk too much on a new hobby.)

The Laser 200 also competed against a wide array of similarly-priced low-end or beginners' machines on the UK market, including the Tandy MC-10, Mattel Aquarius, VIC-20, TI-99/4A, Oric 1, ZX81 and Jupiter Ace. Computers for All's own advertising promoted the Laser 200, alongside other formats, for several months.

In early 1984, Computers for All (by then, its sole UK distributor) ceased trading, casting doubt on the future of the Laser 200. It had still not been adopted for sale by any major UK high street chains by then and software availability had remained a consistent problem. As of July 1984, it still had no replacement distributor and there is little evidence to suggest any further attempts were made to market the format in the UK.

=== United States of America ===
In early 1983, Video Technology exhibited a VZ200-badged version of the machine at the Winter CES. Creative Computing gave it a positive reception, calling it "the sleeper hit of the show at just $99" and, in their full review a couple of months after, stated that "the VZ200 is a great value for the suggested price of under $100".

Later that year, it was reported that it was being renamed "Laser 200" for the US market. Video Technology's US branch was still continuing to promote the Laser 200 alongside newer models at the following Winter CES in early 1984.

In 1985, the first branch of Video Technology was opened in the United States at 390 Convention Way, Redwood City, California. This location served as the main office, mail order center, kit assembly area and retail store. Additional stores were opened in Shattuck Avenue, Berkeley, California; Stevens Creek Boulevard, San Jose, California; and Los Angeles. Within a few years the US operation was sold.

There have also been numerous reports over the years of owners having the NTSC model Laser 200, 210 and 310, as well as VTech VZ200s that have been reportedly having been sold and distributed throughout the US.

It has also been reported that an electronics magazine in that era also advertised a training course which gave away a VZ200 computer. This is in similar fashion to that of what happened within Australia in the mid-1980s.

==== Smart Alec Jr ====
Smart Alec Jr

The Laser 210 was also re-labelled as the Smart Alec Jr, and sold/distributed on a small scale throughout the USA by Dynasty Computer Corporation, a company that sold computers via independent door-to-door salespeople and in-home demonstrations.

At one point, the Smart Alec Jr and 16K expansion were given away free with the purchase of 25 pieces of software (for a typical average of $390).

It is unknown how many units were sold.

== Technical specification (Laser200/Laser210/VZ200) ==
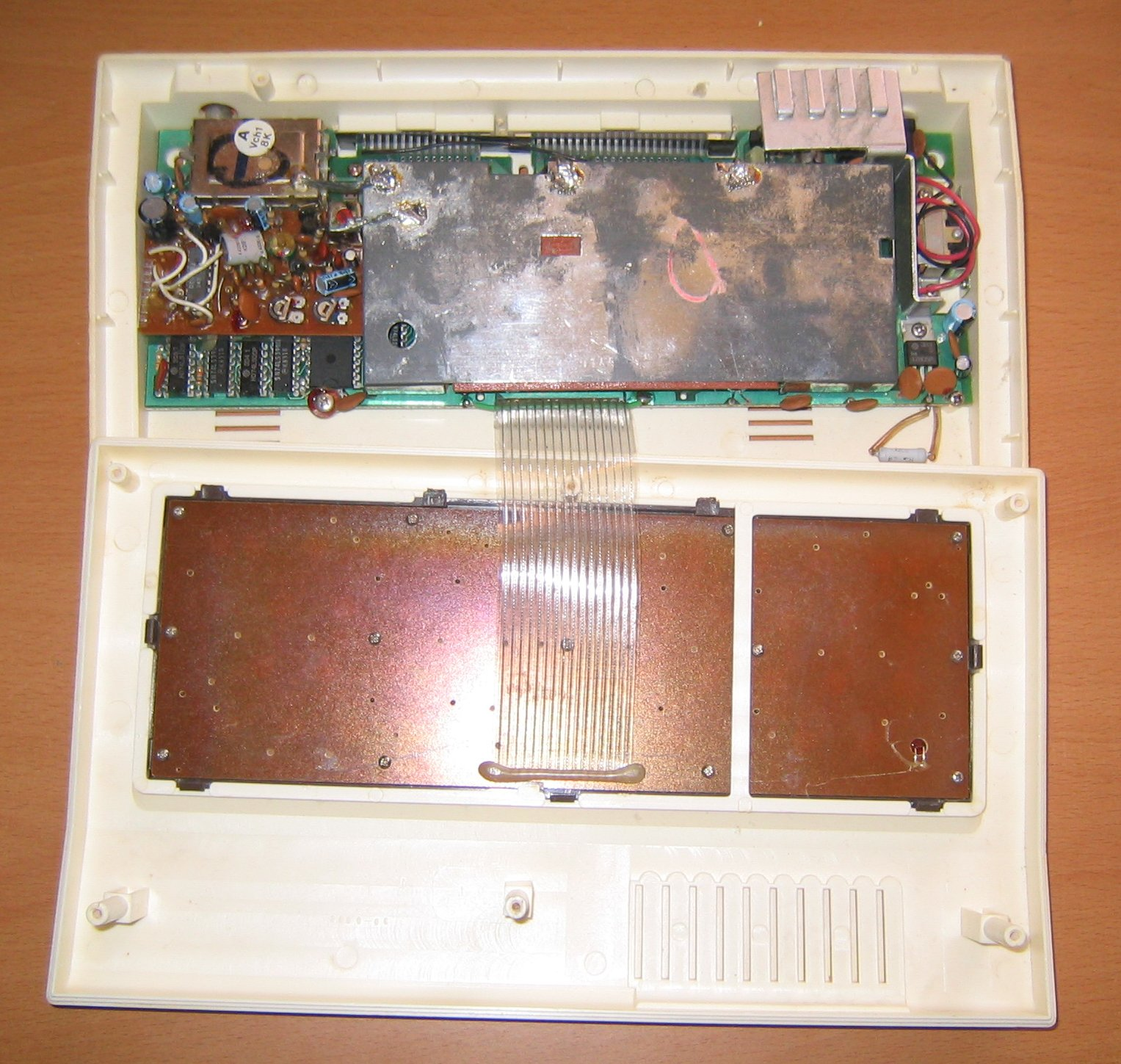
Inside the case of a VZ200

The VZ200 has three circuit boards, the video board and voltage regulator being separate to the main board.

Externally, the VZ200 resembles a cross between the VIC-20 and the ZX Spectrum. The VZ200 has the one touch command keys of the Spectrum, but unlike the Sinclair machines, their use was not mandatory.

Internally, the VZ200 is a workalike of the Tandy TRS-80 Model I, with Level II BASIC. The micro uses the same basic architecture, and TRS-80 Level I and II programs can be loaded straight from cassette tape with the VZLOADXX utility. The VZ/Laser computer has a different memory map to that of the TRS80, and some commands in BASIC have been hidden – possibly an attempt to avoid Microsoft licensing copyright infringement. These hidden commands can easily be re-enabled; however, overall, the Laser/VZ is not considered a true clone of the TRS80 I/II.

The connections consist of a port for an unregulated DC power supply (the voltage regulator is on the PCB), a stereophonic earphone jack for a cassette recorder, an RF modulated video output, an edge connector which is a printer and disk drive port, an edge connector that is a joystick port, and a composite monitor output (NTSC 60 Hz output in North America, PAL 50 Hz output in the British Commonwealth and continental Europe), and SCART in other parts of the world.

The VZ200 uses a copy of a Zilog Z80 processor (made under licence by NEC) running at 3.58 Mhz (3.54 MHz on VZ300) and was initially sold with either 4 kB RAM (Europe) or 6 kB RAM (in North America), which was increased to 8 kB RAM within weeks of its release. Throughout Australia and New Zealand, the VZ200 was initially released as an 8 kB unit. A 16 kB expansion unit was available, increasing RAM to 24 kB. The VZ300 was released with 18 kB of RAM including 2 of video RAM.

An 8 kB system consists of 6 kB of RAM, 2 kB of video RAM, and 16 kB of ROM. The memory could be expanded to 24 kB (22 kB memory plus 2 kB video memory). Like the TRS-80, both memory and I/O locations are mapped.

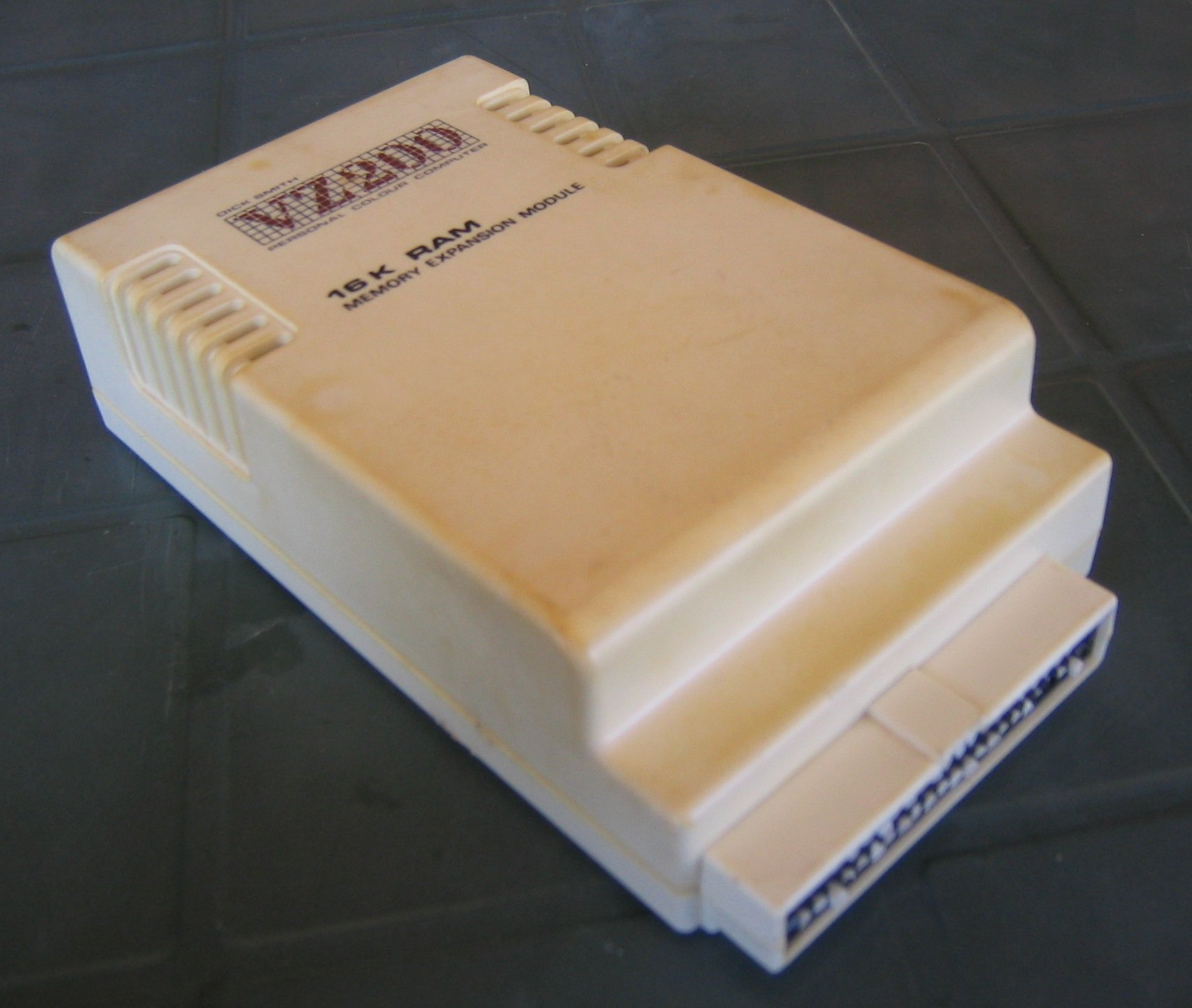
The optional 16 kB RAM expansion

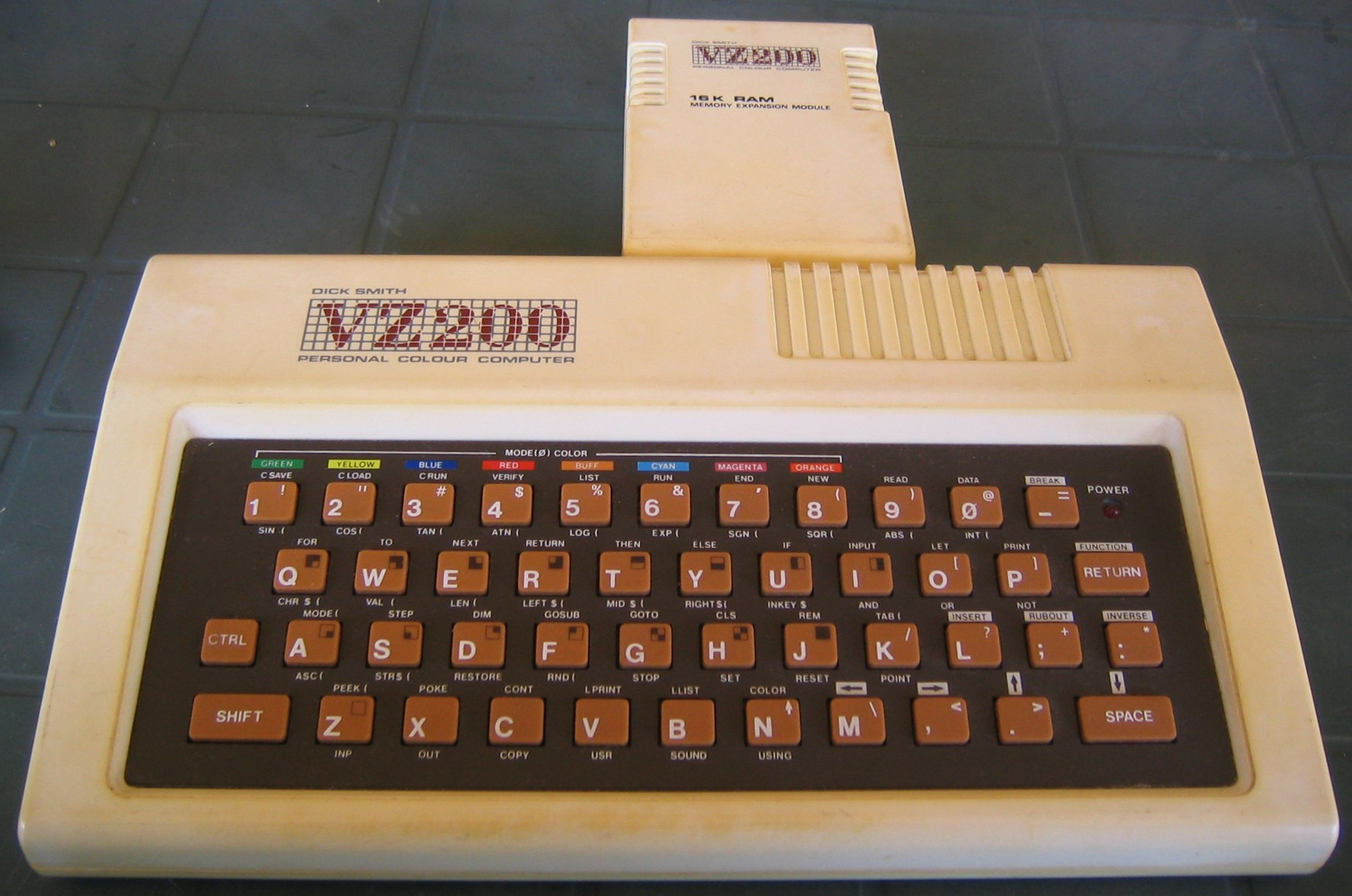
VZ200 with additional RAM plugged in

Extended RAM was available above top RAM using the remote offset addressing method available on the Z80 (also known as bank switching).

Banks of system memory can be reassigned using an offset above the top RAM. Those banks are then no longer available, so program algorithms cannot be used in extended memory (as the program would "disappear" when extended memory is accessed), so it can only be used for program data.

Video RAM can be increased to access the higher modes of the 6847 since there are video RAM chip select lines on the memory expansion. Remote offset addressing must be used because the video processor cannot address system or internal expansion RAM, externally connected RAM must be used.

=== Video ===
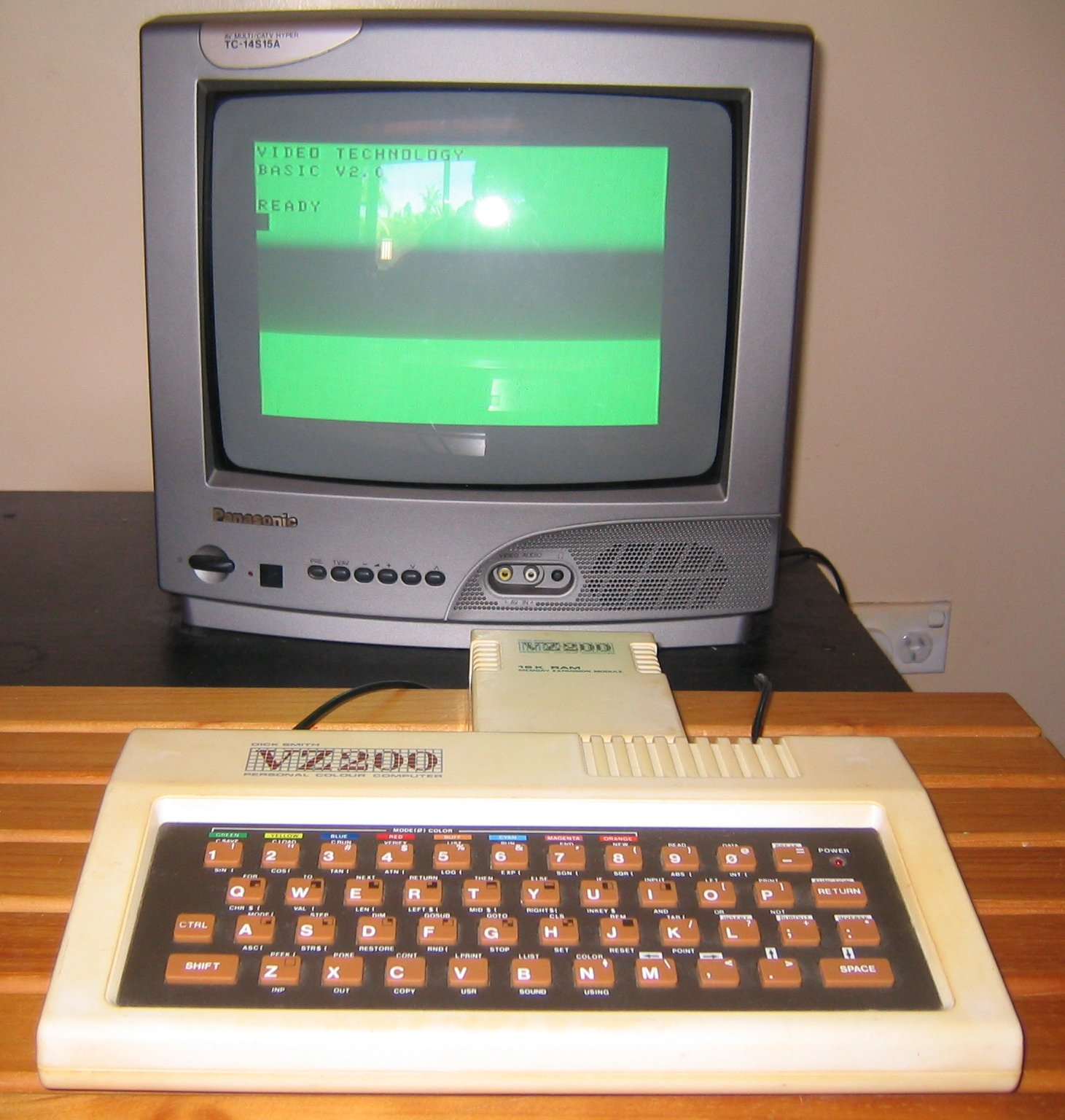
A VZ200 in operation

The VZ200 uses the Motorola 6847 video processor (like the TRS-80 Color Computer), which has a resolution of 256×192 pixels. Video output can either be split into 8 × 8 pixel character blocks in a 32×24 block screen or used as a single monochrome bitmap.

As the VZ200 is limited to only 2 kB of video memory since only 4 kB of memory in total was initially available, the screen is limited to only 16 lines down.

The VZ200 supports up to ten colours, an eight colour palette plus black and buff. The MC 6847 has 256 predefined character blocks. Text is only available in upper case and the character blocks cannot be redefined. The VZ200 uses these characters, although it has alternate character patterns stored in its ROM. The screen can use green mode or black mode, the latter using inverse colours.

==== MODE 0 ====
In mode 0, the background colour can be either dark green or orange. Dark green (COLOR,0) consists of ten individual unique colours in total, whilst with the orange background (COLOR,1) eleven colours in total are available.

Text uses a black foreground with either background colour. The first 128 character blocks are 64 alpha-numeric characters and their inverses. Text mode 0 is the only mode in which black is available.

The latter 128 character blocks consist of a 2×2 pixel block in each possible combination (8), in every of the 8 colour palette for foreground, together with either background colour chosen.

==== MODE 1 ====
The 'hires' graphics mode has a resolution of 128×64 or 8192 addressable points. Memory addressing for video RAM starts at 0x7000 and ends at 0x77FF.

For mode 1, two colour sets are used with each background colour:

SET 1 → background: light green – foreground: light green, yellow, blue or red
SET 2 → background: buff [white] – foreground: buff, cyan, magenta or orange

Only four colours from either colour set can be displayed no the screen at any one time. All 2 kB of video memory is used in Mode 1.

By using intricate video timing it is possible to split the display to show all eight colours on the screen at the same time, as shown in the VZ200 Five Finger Punch demo '2018AD' and Bushy555's demo '8 colours'.

=== Sound output ===
An internal latch is used for cassette output, to drive the piezoelectric loudspeaker attached to the casing, and to control two signals for the 6847 video processor. The loudspeaker is driven using a push-pull method, alternating the outputs on bits 0 and 5 of the latch at $6800.

A 2.5 octave range is available in BASIC through the SOUND command.

A number of the ZX Spectrum 1-bit music players will also work directly on the VZ/Laser computer. 1-bit music is possible through the speaker, the cassette port, or through the parallel printer interface. Since the latch has two bits driving the internal piezo speaker and the cassette port, there is the ability of a software driven volume control – no volume, half-volume and full-volume.

Full 8-bit wave and music files can be played through a DAC connected to the parallel printer interface, far exceeding the computer's original advertised 31 pitched notes in BASIC.

=== Peripherals ===
==== Disk drives ====
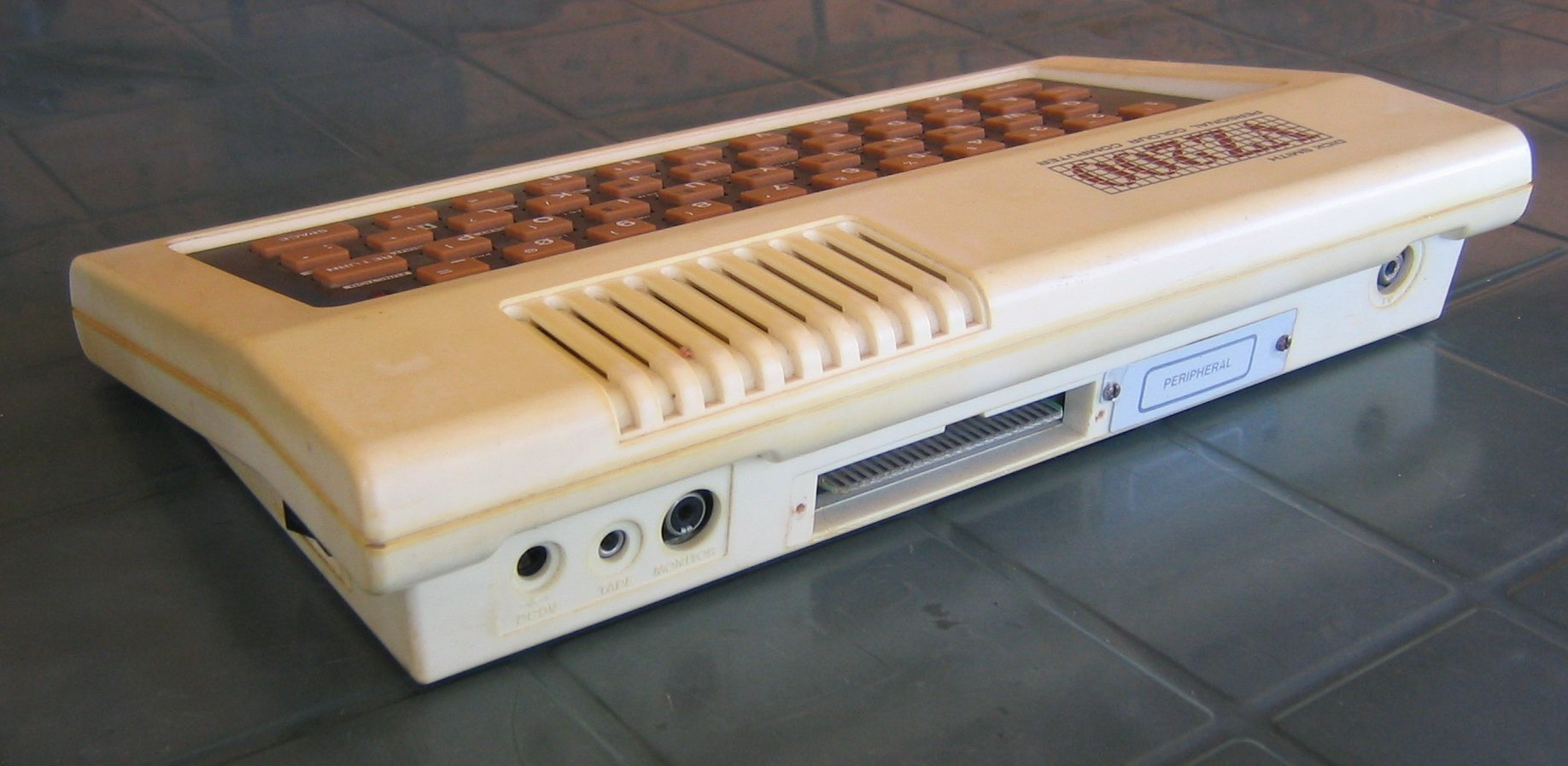
The back panel of the VZ200

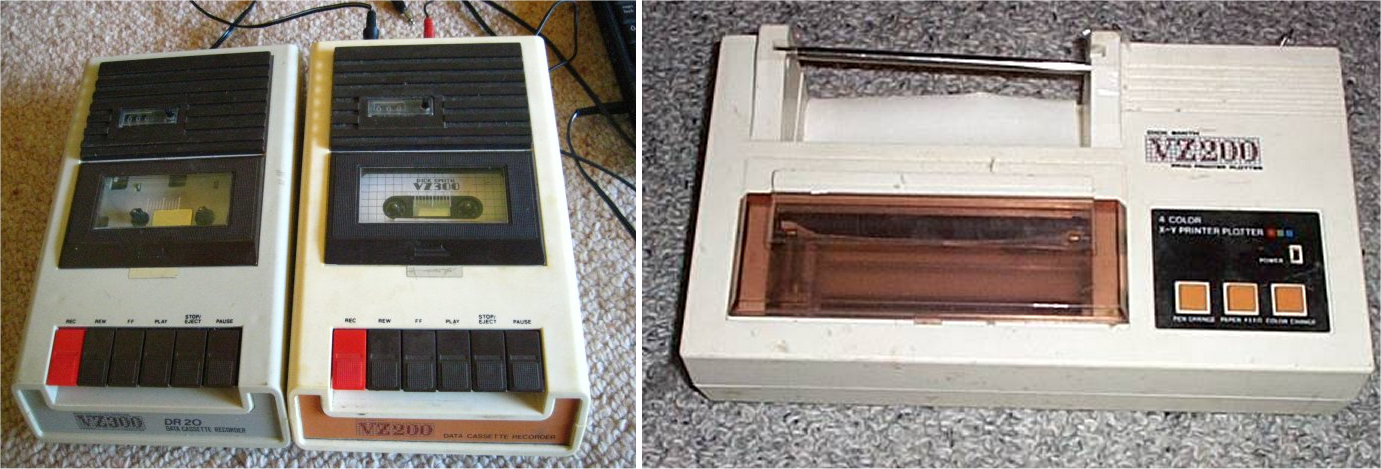
The VZ200 and VZ300 datasettes along with the VZ200 Printer Plotter

In 1984 disk drive units were released onto the German market and to the rest of the world in 1985. Two drive units could be connected to the computer at the same time through the drive controller. A plug-pack cartridge controller containing the DOS ROM was required to operate the drives. The DOS ROM and diskette drives were backwards compatible with the Laser 110, 210 and 310.

==== Other contemporary peripherals ====
A number of other VTech designed plug-in peripherals were also available for both the Laser 200 and Laser 310 computers. Among them were joysticks, cassette drive, light pen, printer plotter, 75 baud modem, word processor cartridge, an 16kB and 64kB extended RAM cartridges. As numbers of users grew, so did the number of home-made kits which were on offer, which included a speech synthesizer, a Music Synthesiser that used the Texas Instruments SN76489AN chip, a real world relay interface, EEPROM programmer, data logger, 300 baud MODEM, full 101-key keyboard, 128 Kb sideways RAM extension and a RTTY Ham radio kit.

==== Later developments ====
In 2020 Ben Grimmett from BennVenn Electronics designed and built 50 SD card readers for enthusiasts, which gives the computer a total of 128 Kb of banked RAM, and, depending on the SD memory card, a minimum of 2 gigabytes of storage space. A FAT32 DOS was also written for this project and is embedded in EEPROM. A second release was created in 2022 with another forty units being created with a few DOS updates for full file access. Full music and graphical videos can be directly played from the SD card.

== Variants and other models ==
This section covers models that are notably different to the standard Laser 200 and 210 beyond the simple name changes covered above.

=== Laser 100 / Laser 110 ===
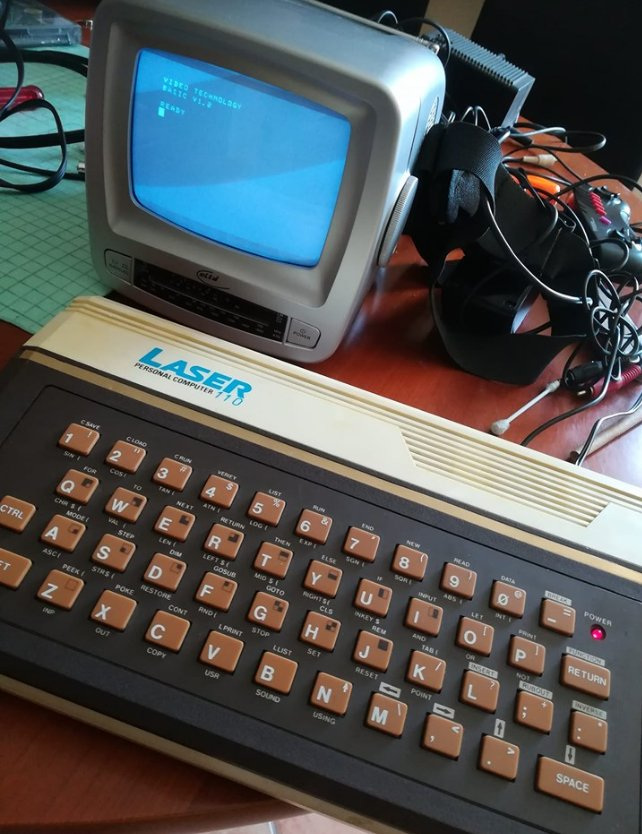
The Video Technology Laser 110 computer.

The Laser 100 and 110 came out shortly before the Laser 200 and Laser 210 / VZ200 and were an earlier version of the same basic design. From the point of view of the BASIC ROM, these machines were very similar to the original TRS-80 Model I.

As with the Laser 200/210 and later models, the Laser 100/110 uses a MC6847 video chip, which was used in numerous other computers during the late 1970s and early 1980s including the TRS-80 Color Computer. (Note: However, it was otherwise unrelated to the TRS-80 Color Computer ("CoCo"). Although the Laser 100, 110, 200, 210 and 310 were based on the original TRS-80 Model I, the CoCo itself was a completely different and incompatible design, and only had the "TRS-80" branding in common with its predecessor.)

However, unlike their successors, the Laser 100/110 supported black and white graphics only. While the 6847 chip itself was capable of colour, and both the 100 and 110 supported colour within the internal language interpreters (BASIC, assembler), the output video from the NTSC and PAL circuitry was monochrome.

Both computers were released with the same orange coloured keyboard 'chicklet' style keyboard on a black background, and had the same BASIC in ROM, of which there are at least three known versions: 1.0, 1.1 and 1.2.

The Laser 100 was released with 2 kB RAM + 2 kB Video RAM, whilst the Laser 110 was released with 4 kB RAM + 2 kB Video RAM.

The Laser 100 and 110 computers were never released as a re-badged 'VZ 100'.

=== Laser 300 ===
Laser 300 with two Laser 200s, spotted in a flea market in a local town in China

One legitimate Laser 300 was found within the Chinese 'flea market' clearly pictured as a 'Laser 300' in 2024. No hardware details were obtained.

=== Laser 305 ===
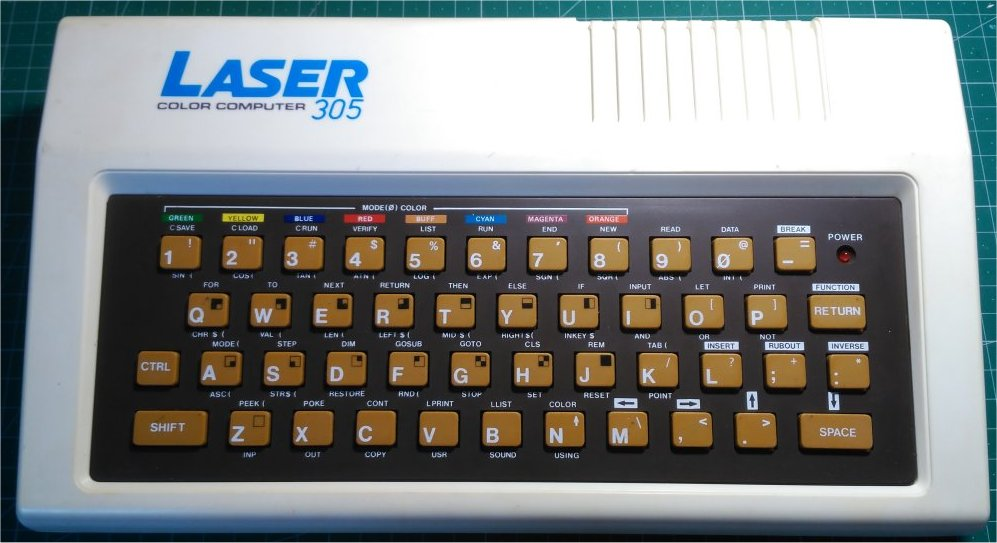
A rare Laser 305 computer

The Laser 305 is an extremely rare computer produced by Video Technology. Essentially it is the Laser 310 motherboard placed inside the Laser 200 keyboard, of which, anyone with these two computers could perform themselves. However, the original release, and the reasoning behind VTech releasing this particular configuration, have been lost to history. As of July 2021 there were only two known Laser 305s in existence.

=== Laser 310 / VZ-300 ===
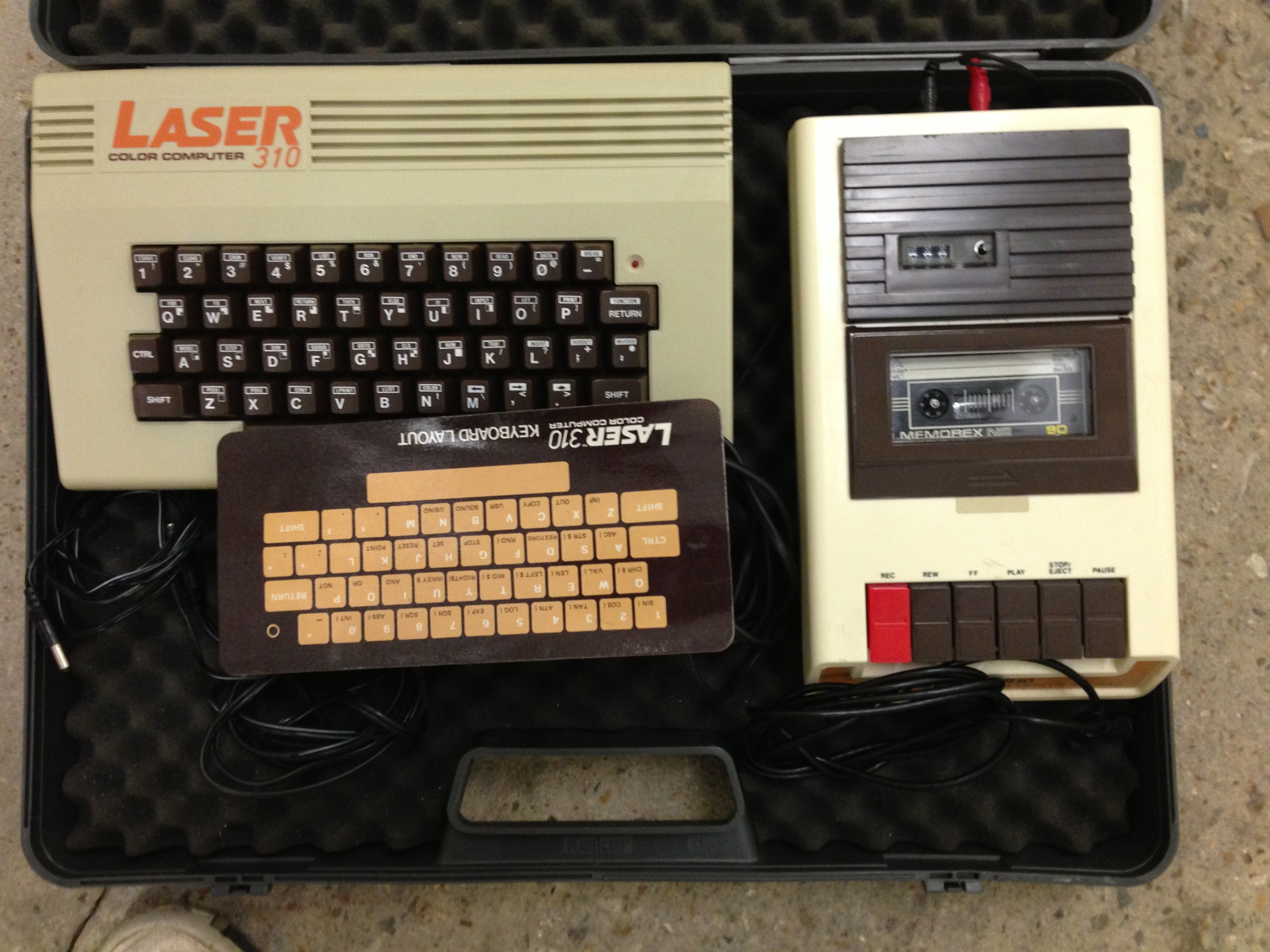
VTech Laser 310 with keyboard template and cassette deck

The Laser 310 was an enhanced version of the Laser 200/210 whose primary changes were a typewriter-style keyboard with hard keys, a new case and more memory.

In April 1984, the Laser 310 was exhibited at that year's CeBIT exhibition in Hanover. In West Germany and France it launched in late 1984.

It also sold throughout parts of Europe as well as in Mainland China and was named and sold as the "Dick Smith" VZ 300 throughout Australia and New Zealand from 1985 on.

Also based on a Zilog Z80A CPU with a slightly updated 16kB ROM version, it was driven by a television colour burst (3.54 MHz) crystal. It came with 16kB of RAM for programming, along with the same 2kB of video RAM as the Laser 200.

The VZ300 had a small number of physical upgrades, but is completely compatible with the VZ200. There were three models of keyboard released for the VZ300:

1. Brown keys with no under-key labels. (1985)
2. Brown keys with under-key labels. (1986)
3. Light-grey/cream coloured keys, with under-key labels. (1987)

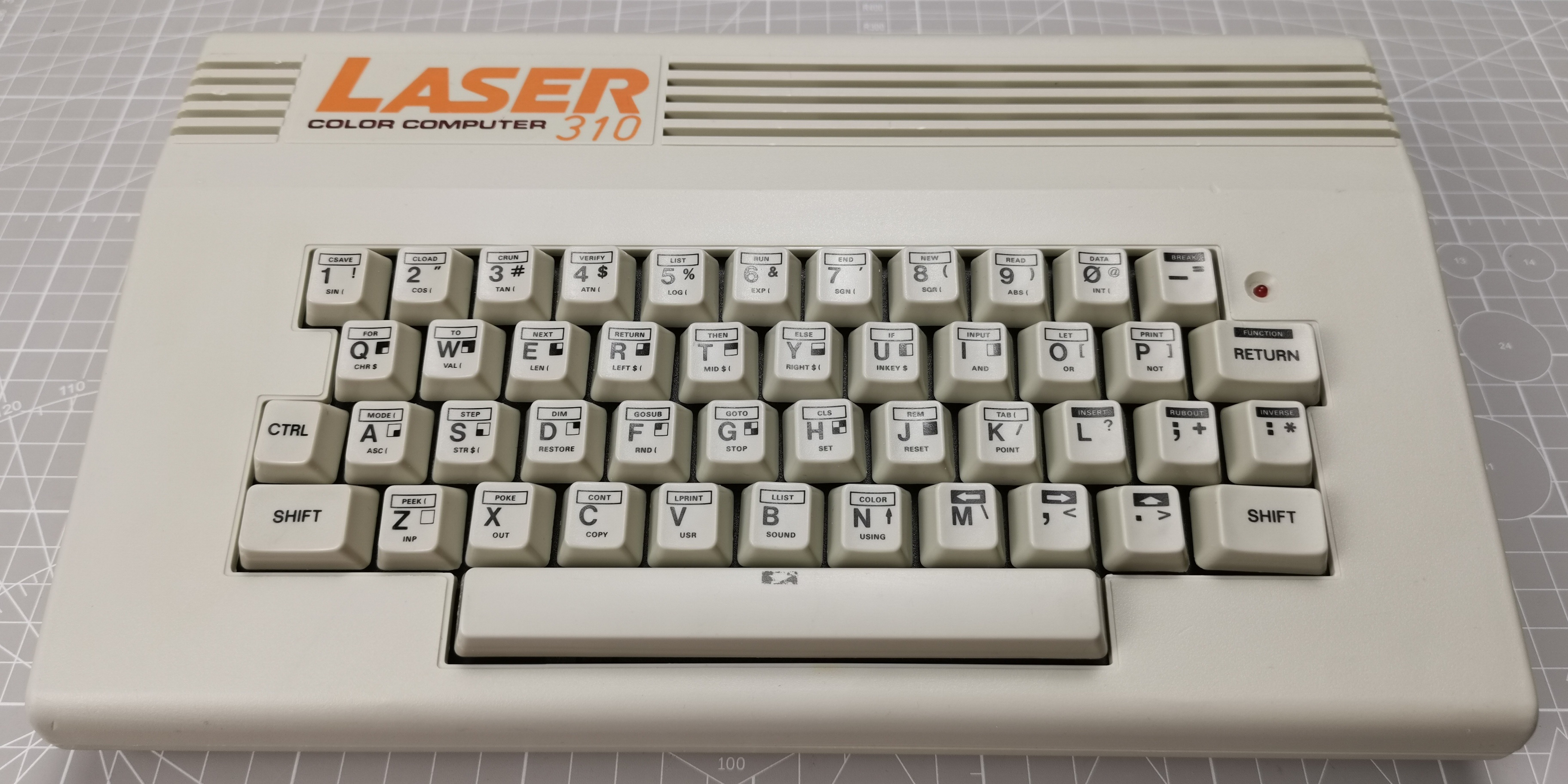
VTech Laser 310 (1987) with Light-grey/cream coloured keys and under-key labels

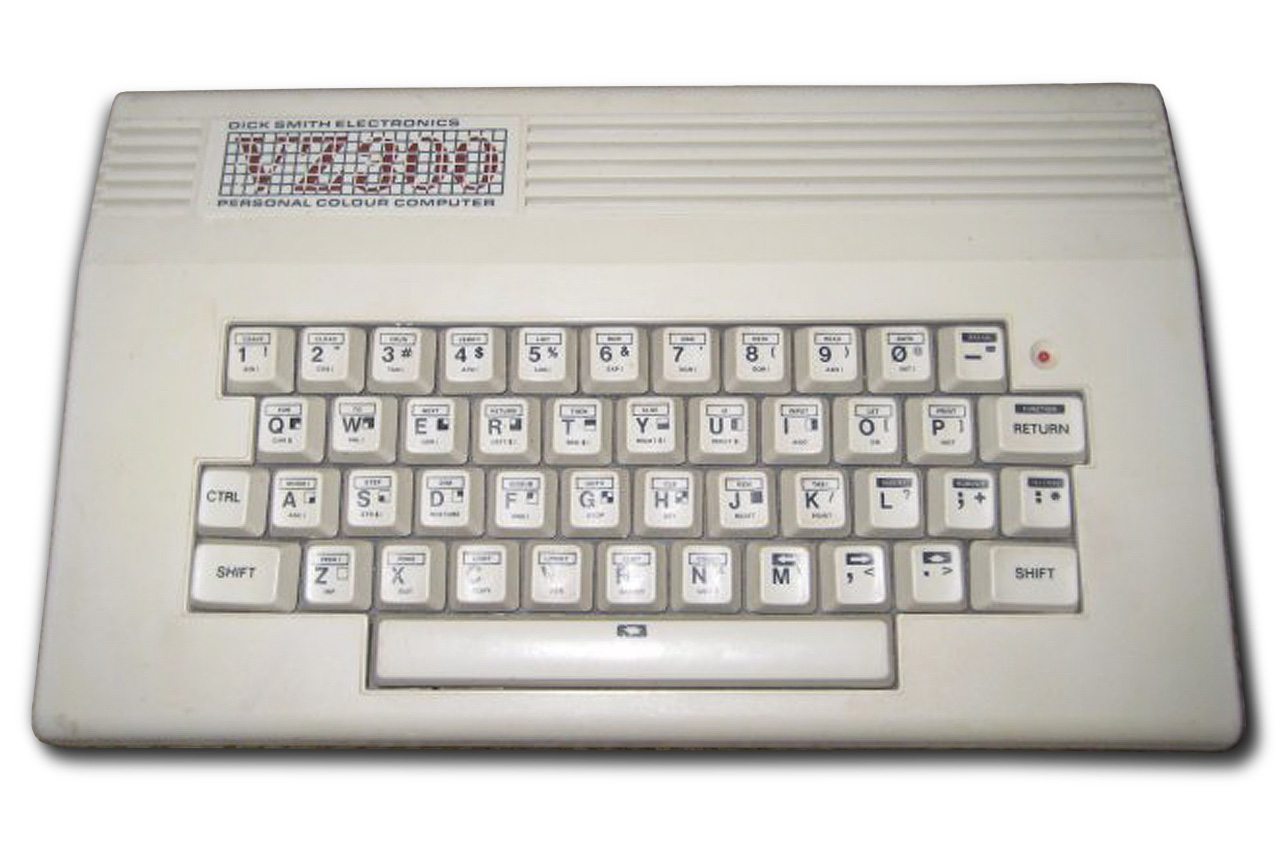
Dick Smith VZ300, a rebranded VTech Laser 310

Externally, the rubber keys were replaced with hard plastic capped keys and the case was made with a less brittle type of plastic.

Video Technology used higher capacity memory ICs for the VZ300, having 18 kB of memory (16 kB CPU RAM + 2 kB video RAM). The system RAM capacity was increased to 16 kB, which together with 16 kB of expansion RAM, making a total of 34 kB RAM for the system.

The VZ200 16 kB RAM expansion could be used, but because of the way the chip select pins were arranged, only 8 kB would actually be available. ETI magazine in Australia published an electronic circuit which would enable VZ300 owners to use all 16 kB of the VZ200 expansion.

There is at least one VZ300 known to exist with 66 kB of memory (64 kB RAM + 2 kB Video) on the motherboard, built by Video Technology. This unit uses 8 x HM4864P-2 8 kB static RAM chips instead of the usual 8 x 2 kB memory chips.

=== Seltron 200 ===
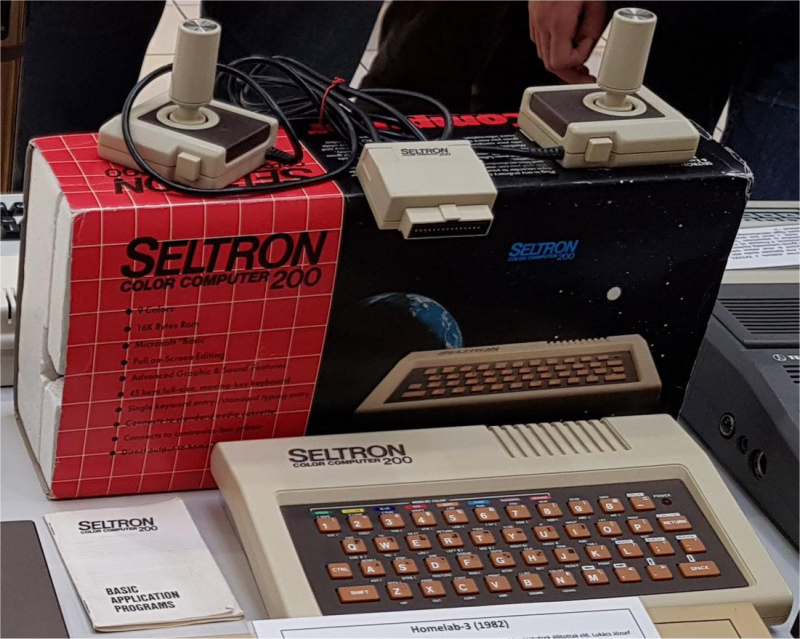

Known examples of the "Seltron 200 Color Computer"–badged variant are unique in terms of their motherboard design, which features a layout and configuration quite different to those used for other models in the family.

Named after the supermarket retail chain 'Scale ELEKTRON' imported units into Austria and was sold throughout the countries of Austria, Hungary and Italy.

In Hungary, the Seltron 200 was distributed by Skála-Coop but was unsuccessful and remained obscure. Despite the lack of cheap computers at that time, it proved unpopular even among uninformed buyers due to incompatibility and lack of support. (In response to an owner's complaint about this, one publication suggested that Skála-Coop had most likely acquired a limited number of machines cheaply and simply dumped them on the market without support.)

In 1989, when unsold examples were still on the Hungarian market, the magazine Mikrovilág speculatively estimated that around 80 units had been imported into Austria circa 1984-85.

The Seltron's motherboard contained the same custom VZ300/Laser 310 single packaged GA003 and GA004 chipsets (which replaced discrete VZ200/Laser 200-210 components), though the design eliminated the need for the GA008 (clock register and DRAM controller) that is used in the 16 Kb VZ300/Laser 310. Some speculate that it was Video Technology's attempt at cost reducing the manufacturing process. It was released with the usual 2 Kb of video RAM, along with 2 Kb of user RAM (same as the Laser 200), but the motherboard allowed for further expansion of another 2 KB or 4 Kb of RAM. By adding an additional 2x 2 KB user RAM it would bring the Seltron up to the same spec as an "8K" VZ200/Laser 210. The Seltron also had the standard 16kB ROM and the motherboard allowed for the option of either a single 16 kB ROM package or 2x 8 kB ROM chip packages.

As of 2022 there are around 10 Seltron 200 computers known to be existing, mostly throughout in Hungary.

=== Unrelated "VTech Laser" models ===
The 'Laser' name was also used on several other computers sold by VTech that were incompatible with or completely unrelated to the Laser 100–310 family.

The Laser 500 and Laser 750 computers were released later, based on Z80 processor technology (MSX clones), having a 32kB ROM (including BASIC version 3.0) with 64kB of RAM. The Laser 500 and Laser 750 are not backwards-compatible with the Laser 100 to 310 family.

The Laser 128 was an Apple II clone released in 1986.

The Laser 2001 was a computer based on the "CreatiVision" console design, which was based around a 6502 CPU and thus completely incompatible with the Z80-based Laser 100 to 310.

== Software ==
=== Australia and New Zealand ===
Most VZ200 programs were written in Australia, where the rebadged "Dick Smith VZ200" and "VZ300" were popular enough to remain on sale until the late 1980s.

There, it occupied a similar "beginner's machine" niche to the Sinclair ZX81 (a computer to which the VZ200 had been compared, but which was never widely available in Australia because of production problems in the UK) and was a system which many early programmers learnt on.

Store fronts throughout Australia and New Zealand sold many titles, including educational and graphical games, finance programs and various software utility tools, most of which have been found and transferred for the use in the various emulators. Unfortunately, there are a number of known software packages that have simply been lost through the passage of time.

Dick Smith Electronics ran a program buying software from local programmers and selling them through their stores for $12 a cassette.

The lack of foreign competition tended to encourage local programmers, programmers there having little success competing with foreign programs on the most popular system, the Commodore 64.

=== Elsewhere ===
One VZ200 developer noted that some software sold by Dick Smith Electronics was developed in Taiwan. (However, if this was a reference to VTech's own software, this may be in error, as VTech was based in Hong Kong, not Taiwan.)

While at least one UK developer (Abbex) attempted to support the Laser 200 in conjunction with its distributor and had at least one commercial release the machine was unsuccessful there, with software availability remaining a problem up until the time of its disappearance from the market.

With both of their releases in Germany, USA, Italy and a few other countries, commercially based software titles grew and were distributed throughout various outlets in their home countries.

=== BASIC ===
The VZ includes a built-in BASIC interpreter in ROM, which is used not just for programming, but for accessing the OS, recording programs, and all other operations on the computer.

The VZ200 uses a version of Microsoft BASIC II, similar but not identical to Level II BASIC on the TRS-80, including useful commands like SET, PRINT@ and IF-THEN-ELSE. Firmware machine code routines are available using the RSX command. The firmware contains a large number of useful routines provided by Zilog, via NEC.

Some TRS-80 BASIC commands, such as RANDOMIZE, ON and the DEF commands (only subroutines can be used for formulae), are not available, so only simple TRS-80 programs can be entered without alteration. A number of Extended Basics were written that "unhid" approximately 25 of these hidden BASIC commands that were partially disabled from factory by Video Technology.

The BASIC can use integers, decimals and floating point numbers. Double precision numbers are not available, but can be used by storing the different power position numbers in a string and concatenating the strings.

=== List of games ===
There are 53 known commercial games for VTech Laser 200:

Game title	Publisher	Release year	Author
Ace of Aces	Dick Smith Electronics	1983	
Air Traffic Controller	Dick Smith Electronics	1983	John Keetch and P. Russell
Airline	Cases Computer Simulations Ltd.	1984	
Asteroids	Dick Smith Electronics	1983	Dubios & McNamara
Attack Killer Tomato	Dick Smith Electronics	1984	Apolon Ivankovic
Backgammon	Dick Smith Electronics	1983	
Blackjack	Dick Smith Electronics	1983	
Boskone Alert	Cosmic Software	1983	
Byter	Protek Computing Ltd	1984	
Camelot	Protek Computing Ltd	1984	
Checkers	Dick Smith Electronics	1983	
Chess	Dick Smith Electronics	1983	
Chopper Rescue			
Circus	Dick Smith Electronics	1983	Dubios & McNamara
Crash-2 / Crash-4	Dick Smith Electronics	1983	
Dallas	Cases Computer Simulations Ltd.	1984	
Dawn Patrol	Dick Smith Electronics	1983	Dubios & McNamara
Deep Sea Adventure			
Defence Penetrator	Dick Smith Electronics	1983	Tom Theil
Diamond Deal Poker Machine	Dick Smith Electronics	1983	Applied Software
Digout	Dick Smith Electronics	1983	Dubios & McNamara
Dracula's Castle	Dick Smith Electronics	1983	David Woods
Duel: Gunfight	Dick Smith Electronics	1983	
Dynasty Derby	Dick Smith Electronics	1983	James Gamm. Dynasoft.
Escape River	Le VZ OOP	1983	Larry Taylor
Flight Deck	Dick Smith Electronics?	1983	F. Halliwell
Formula One	Dick Smith Electronics	1983	Stephen Clarke
Galactic Invasion	Abbex Electronics Ltd.	1984	
Galaxon	Dick Smith Electronics	1983	Stephen Clarke
Ghost Hunter	Dick Smith Electronics	1983	Dubios & McNamara
Hamburger Sam	Dick Smith Electronics	1983	Dubios & McNamara
Hangman	Dick Smith Electronics	1983	
Hiiripeli/Mouse Puzzle			
Hoppy	Dick Smith Electronics	1983	Dubios & McNamara
Horse/Rabbit Racing	Dick Smith Electronics	1983	
Ihmekana/Crazy Chicky			
Invaders	Dick Smith Electronics	1983	Dubios & McNamara
Kamakazi	Dick Smith Electronics	1983	
Key Hunter	Video Technology	1983	
Knights & Dragons	Dick Smith Electronics	1983	Philip Hayne
L Game			
Ladder Challenge	Dick Smith Electronics	1983	Dubois & McNamara
Laser Chase			
Laser Pac			
Lear Jet	Dick Smith Electronics	1983	John Keetch and P. Russell
Lunar Lander	Dick Smith Electronics	1983	John Keetch and P. Russell
Matchbox	Dick Smith Electronics	1983	
Maze of Argon	Dick Smith Electronics	1983	Stephen Clarke
Melbourne Cup	Dick Smith Electronics	1983	Stephen Clarke
Missile Attack	Dick Smith Electronics	1983	
Morgoth	Cosmic Software	1983	
Othello	Dick Smith Electronics	1983	Peter Sek
Penguin	Dick Smith Electronics	1983	Dubios & McNamara
Phaorah's Curse	Dick Smith Electronics	1983	Dubois & McNamara
Planet Defender			
Planet Patrol	Dick Smith Electronics	1983	
Poker	Dick Smith Electronics	1983	
Rally Racer	Cosmic Software	1983	
Road Warrior	Cosmic Software	1983	
Slot Machine/Russian Roulette	Dick Smith Electronics	1983	
Space Ram	Dick Smith Electronics	1983	
Star Blaster	Dick Smith Electronics	1983	Dubois & McNamara
Super Snake	Dick Smith Electronics	1983	Dubios & McNamara
Tennis	Dick Smith Electronics	1983	
Tennis / Golf Lesson	Dick Smith Electronics	1983	
The Dynasty Derby	Dynasoft	1983	
Tote Racing	Dick Smith Electronics	1983	
Totiliser Derby	Dick Smith Electronics	1983	Applied Software
VZ Monopply	VZDU	1985	Scott Le Brun
VZ-Panic	Dick Smith Electronics	1983	Dubios & McNamara
Flashword A – 1 & 2	Dick Smith Electronics	1983	Wayne G. Richmond. Cosmic Software.
Flashword B – 3 & 4	Dick Smith Electronics	1983	Wayne G. Richmond. Cosmic Software.
Maths Armada	Dick Smith Electronics	1983	
Keyboard	Le VZ OOP	1983	Larry Taylor
Metric Spycatcher	Dick Smith Electronics	1983	Wayne G. Richmond. Cosmic Software.
Whizkid Spycatcher	Dick Smith Electronics	1983	Wayne G. Richmond. Cosmic Software.
Speed Reading	Dick Smith Electronics	1983	Jim Rowe
Spell O Matic 1 & 2	Dick Smith Electronics	1983	Wayne G. Richmond. Cosmic Software.
Spell'O'Matic 3 & 4	Dick Smith Electronics	1983	Wayne G. Richmond. Cosmic Software.
Word Matching	Le VZ OOP	1983	Larry Taylor

== Emulators ==
A number of emulators for various platforms have since been written for these models of computers:

- MAME/MESS VZ/Laser emulation by Juergen Buchmueller and Dirk Best.
- JEMU (for Java) by Richard Wilson.
- JVZ200 (for Windows) by James Tamer.
- VZEM (Windows, Linux and DOS versions) by Guy Thomason.
- Pocket VZ (for the Pocket PC) by Guy Thomason.
- Android VZ (for the Android OS) by Guy Thomason.
- WinVZ300 / DSEVZ200 / Emulator 2001 by Gavin Turner.
- VZ SoundPaint (Java) by Jürgen Reuter.
- VZ200 Remake java emu by C Wahlmann.
- Windows Laser 310 Emu by ZZemu.
- FPGA VZ emulator by ZZEMU.
- VZ Emulator by Paul Anderson.
- VZ-Next (ESP32/Windows/Linux/Raspi) by Paul Robson.
- MiSTer FPGA core by Alan Hanson
- JSMESS by Jason Scott
- Browser-based laser310-emu by Antonino Porcino.
