= Batteroo Boost =

- Developer: Batteroo, Inc.
- Type: Consumer electronics
- Released: TBA
- Website: https://www.batteroo.com/

The Batteroo Boost (formerly known as the Batteriser (/ˈbætəraɪzər/ BAT-ər-eyez-ər)) is a line of products designed by Batteroo, Inc. that is claimed to significantly extend battery life by using a miniature boost voltage regulator. It was crowd-funded on Indiegogo. The company is based in Sunnyvale, California and founded by Bob Roohparvar and Frankie Roohparvar.

== Product details ==
A patent was filed by Fariborz Frankie Roohparvar with the priority date of September 20, 2010. The Batteroo Boost is claimed to extend the life of both new and used batteries. Batteroo has said that Batterisers are non-toxic, reusable, and coated with a non-conductive coating to prevent any risk of shorts. They also claim that a built-in reverse polarity protection mechanism eliminates dangers of inserting a battery into the Batteriser the wrong way.

Crowdfunding completed between July 2015 produced $394,459, while the initial goal was $30,000. During the crowdfunding Batteroo announced they would be producing Batteroo Boost for AA, AAA, C, and D batteries. In August 2017, Batteroo launched a second crowd-funding campaign for a line of products for rechargeable batteries called Batteroo Reboost. In this crowd-funding campaign, they raised an additional $42,311.

The shipping date for the product has been delayed for various reasons, but photos from the manufacturing process have been made available. As of early May 2016, the company was months overdue to ship to its Indiegogo backers, with some backers accusing Batteroo of running a scam.

== Product tests ==
In a test by UL, a Garmin Golf GPS using Batteroo Boost was shown to have a lifespan of 10 hours and 12 minutes, in contrast to the 1 hour and 43 minutes of operating time without a Batteroo Boost. However, TechnologyCatalyst repeated the test and found that the Garmin displayed a notification that the backlight could not be turned on due to low voltage after an hour or so on ordinary AA batteries, but then the GPS operated normally for over 17 hours. TechnologyCatalyst suggested that the device could be useful "if Batteriser was honest about its product", not to prolong battery life but to stabilise voltage over its lifetime.

PC World's Jon Phillips demoed the Batteroo Boost operating on batteries in an Apple Inc. keyboard that he claimed were dead. The 'power meter' on the computer's screen showed the batteries as being dead without the Batteroo Boost, and as having 100% power remaining with the Batteriser. Brian Dipert at EDN called into question the strain on the keyboard being caused by the 'power meter,' and suggested that this test might not be representative of the Batteroo Boost's effectiveness in other applications.

== Controversies ==
=== Effectiveness ===
Voltage of an AA alkaline battery during constant-current discharge at 100mA. Energy extracted from the battery is proportional to the area under the graph: energy extracted before V=1.3V energy extracted from V=1.3V until V=1.1V energy not yet extracted in battery when V=1.1V

The Batteriser's efficacy in consumer applications has been challenged by a number of sources.

A source of contention surrounds the brownout voltages for battery-operated devices. David L. Jones in his EEVblog used a programmable power supply to determine that nearly all devices function in some respect until around 1.1V, or roughly 80% of a battery's life due to the non-linear discharge curve of batteries. This stands in contrast to Batteroo's claim that using a Batteroo Boost will unlock the remaining 80% of power (from 1.3V downwards). Batteroo has claimed that the bench power supply test is flawed, because of the definitions used by Jones to define device functionality, the inherent differences between power supplies and batteries on the basis of Equivalent Series Resistance (ESR), and different measures of voltage (confusion between open circuit voltage and closed circuit voltage).

A further source of controversy is that the Batteroo Boost will shorten battery life in devices that undergo only intermittent use, because the Batteriser is always drawing power to boost the voltage, even when the device is idle.

The first devices were delivered at the end of 2016. Frank Buss, and later on, Dave Jones, concluded in a first test that the device is not efficient when used in an electronically-unregulated toy train.

=== Potential dangers ===
David Jones on EEV Blog raised the concern that because the Batteroo Boost acts as a ground for the boost converter circuit, any nick in the insulation might result in a direct short, and potentially a fire.

=== Internet controversy ===
In the wake of Dave Jones' video about Batteriser, his video was disliked by an abnormally large number of Youtube accounts with IP addresses located in Vietnam. Other bloggers with Batteroo Boost-related videos experienced similar activity from addresses in Vietnam. The bloggers involved suspect that either a click farm in Vietnam was engaged to disrepute those attacking Batteroo Boost, or a single computer with many fake or stolen YouTube accounts utilized proxied IP addresses to cover its tracks.

=== Lawsuit regarding name ===
On July 25, 2016, Energizer Brands LLC filed a federal lawsuit, saying that the name Batteriser violates a variety of its trademarks on the word "energizer". The lawsuit said that "... despite advertisements, solicitation, and pre-orders, Batteroo has not delivered a single Batteriser product to a consumer in the ordinary course of business." According to the lawsuit, the Trademark Trial and Appeal Board ruled June 27 in favor of Energizer and refused registration of the Batteriser and Batterise marks. According to Energizer, Batteroo also tried to falsely implicate Energizer in the product delays of Batteriser.

== See also ==
- Undervoltage-lockout
- Joule thief
