= Dick Smith (retailer) =

Former Australian electronics retailer

Dick Smith Electronics Holdings Limited
- Type: Public
- Traded as: ASX: DSH
- Industry: Retail
- Founded: 1968
- Founder: Dick Smith
- Defunct: 3 May 2016
- Fate: Receivership and liquidation; Online assets and branding acquired by Kogan.com
- Headquarters: Chullora, Australia
- Number of locations: 325 stores (2012)
- Areas served: Australia and New Zealand
- Products: Consumer electronics
- Brands: Dick Smith; Dick Smith Powerhouse; Electronics powered by Dick Smith; Move
- Number of employees: 3,300 (2015)
- Website: www.dicksmith.com.au (Australia) www.dicksmith.co.nz(New Zealand)

Dick Smith Electronics Holdings Limited was an Australian chain of retail stores that sold consumer electronics goods, hobbyist electronic components, and electronic project kits. The chain expanded successfully into New Zealand and unsuccessfully into several other countries. The company was founded in Sydney in 1968 by Dick Smith and owned by him and his wife until they sold 60% to Woolworths in 1980, and the remaining 40% two years later.

In 2012, Dick Smith had 263 stores around Australia. It also had 62 stores around New Zealand, including 20 in Auckland.

The company closed all of its stores in 2016, four years after its acquisition by Anchorage Capital Partners, though the Dick Smith brand name continues as an online brand operated by Kogan.com.

== History ==
=== Early years ===
The business started in 1968 in a small $15-rent-per-week premises in a car park in the Sydney suburb of Neutral Bay with a total capital of $610. Initially, the business focused on installing and servicing car radios. In 1969, the business's success required it to move to bigger premises, first Atchison Street, St Leonards, later Carlotta Street, Artarmon with flagship store nearby, on the Pacific Highway, Gore Hill.

When the entire electronics business landscape was remodelled by the Whitlam government's across-the-board 25% tariff cut in 1973, for the loss of 138,000 manufacturing jobs, Smith moved with the market and met the competition with a re-emphasis on imported electronic components and finished products. Alongside the car radio business, he opened "Dick Smith Wholesale". The business catered to electronics hobbyists, meeting a need Smith had felt. In those days, hobbyists could buy components only from larger wholesale companies better set up for dealing with commercial customers. After touring overseas electronic stores to study modern merchandising methods, Smith introduced self-serve shopping, a breakaway from the longstanding counter-sales setup found in component sales at the time, and produced an annual mail-order catalogue with a substantial data section.

=== Publicity stunts ===
The company promoted itself with wacky-style and Smith's own publicity stunts. For example, Smith claimed that he would tow an iceberg from Antarctica to Sydney Harbour, cut it up into small bits and sell it for 10 cents a cube. On the morning of 1 April 1978, it appeared as if he had succeeded as hundreds of phone calls reporting the iceberg began flooding into local newspapers and radio and television stations, most of which were from Dick Smith employees. The "iceberg" turned out to be a barge cloaked in white plastic sheeting and topped with firefighting foam, an April Fool's joke.

=== Expansion ===
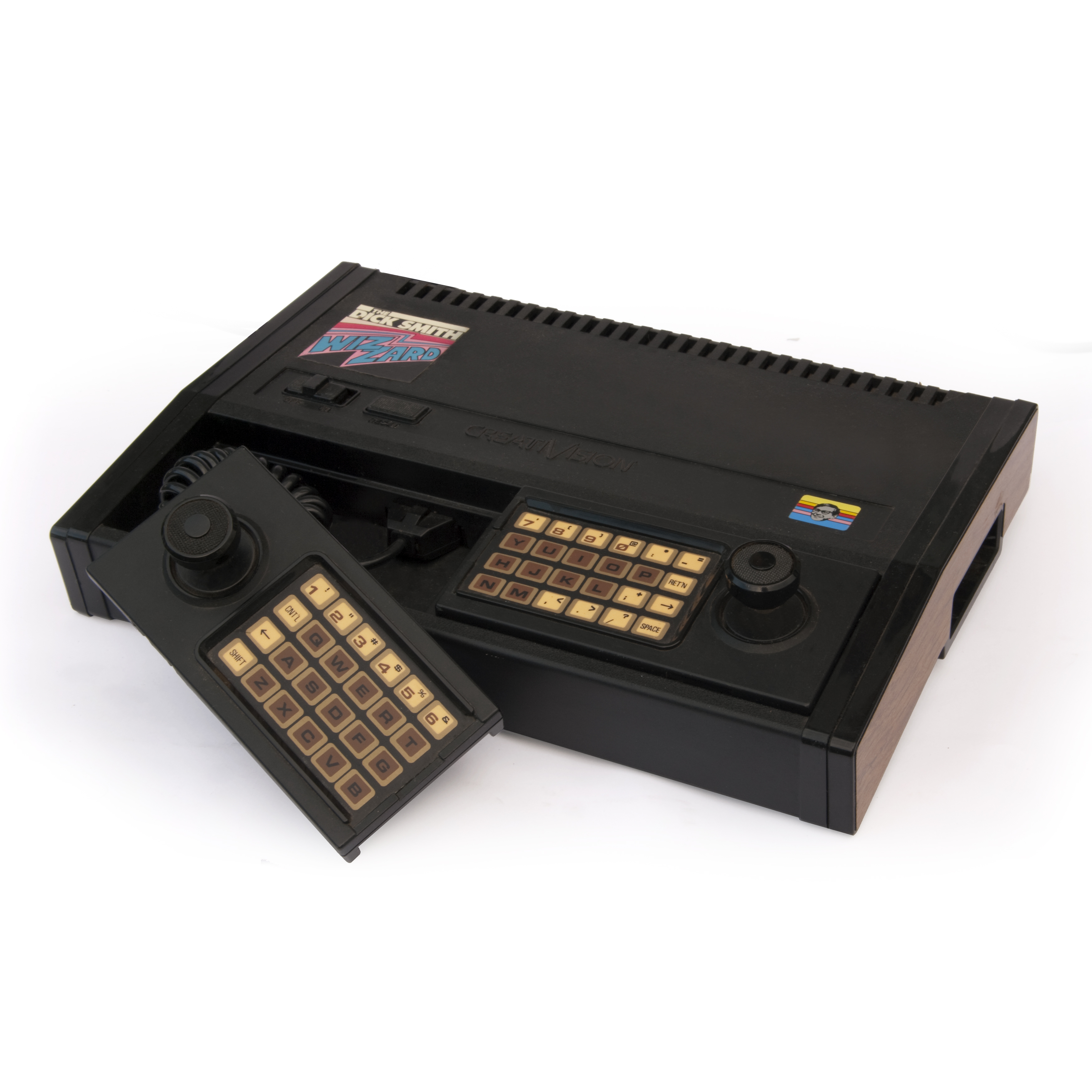
The Dick Smith Wizzard – a combination computer/video game console that was rebranded and sold through the stores

The company profited from the CB radio boom of the 1970s and by the end of the decade had stores in all mainland states. Though many CB radio stores closed when interest waned at the end of the 1970s, Dick Smith Electronics thrived on exploding PC sales and its established electronic components and kit lines.

The Dick Smith Electronics catalogue was included free in the popular electronics magazines Electronics Australia and Electronics Today International. The catalogues included increasing amounts of data on electronic components, which made it a reference for anyone involved in electronics professionally or as a hobby.

Private-branding (as "Dick Smith" or "DSE") was introduced on a large range of products from the late-70s. Many DSE-brand products were re-branded versions of the same or similar products sold in parallel by their manufacturers.

Dick Smith Electronics own-brand System 80 computer, which was a clone of the Tandy TRS-80 Model I, led a highly successful line, including the Dick Smith Cat (an Apple II clone), the VZ-200 and VZ-300. The company also sold brand name personal computers such as the VIC-20 and Commodore 64. In 1981, the Super-80 kit computer was developed as a joint venture between the company and Electronics Australia magazine.

The company expanded its product range, especially during the 1970s and 1980s, and stocked items such as the Heathkit electronic kits, satellite TV receiving stations, Beeple pagers and The Dick Smith Wizzard computer game. The company was an early seller of telephone equipment including answering machines, cordless and novelty phones.

=== Woolworths takeover ===
In 1980, the company had grown to 20 stores and the founder and his wife sold 60% of the company's shares to large general retailer Woolworths. The Smiths sold the balance of the company's capital to Woolworths in 1982, the total transfer price coming to $25million. The company continued to add to its network of small "main street" stores in suburbs and regional cities across Australia.

==== Powerhouse ====
The logo used for Dick Smith Powerhouse stores before the branding was discontinued in 2009

The late 1990s saw the company establish "Dick Smith Powerhouse" super-stores across the east coast of Australia. The first Powerhouse store was opened in Bankstown in 1996. These were several times bigger than regular stores at approximately 2,000 square metres (22,000 sq ft) and contained departments for the main product categories and supermarket-style checkouts. The "Powerhouses", as they were known, carried a wider range of products than the smaller DSE stores, especially in the computing, audio-visual and amateur radio areas, and introduced Music to the range. Some installation services were also introduced as well as Computer repairs and upgrading.

In 2002 and 2003, the Powerhouse concept changed to focus on a broader consumer market and less towards electronics enthusiasts. Component ranges shrank and general electronics books ceased to be stocked. The Yaesu amateur radio dealership was relinquished, ending a 27-year partnership. Electronic kits were transferred to the smaller DSE stores and were replaced by the short-lived appearance of small appliances such as kettles, coffee makers, toasters and frypans. A home installation service known as "PowerSquad" to install major items such as TVs and computer systems or to provide set-up and training on smaller items such as wireless networking, MP3 players and iPods was offered. In late 2007, Powerhouse stores also transferred many other small components, tools, leads and connectors to small stores, continuing to distance the super-stores from the company's electronic enthusiast roots.

==== Major changes ====
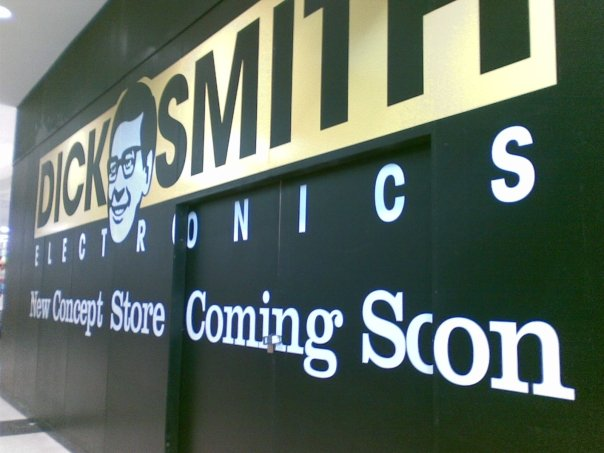
Hornsby DSE, housed inside Westfield Hornsby, was the first store to be renovated under the new concept

In early 2008, following Woolworths' review of its consumer electronics division, Dick Smith Electronics renovated its flagship store at Westfield Hornsby, as a "concept" under the branding "Dick Smith Technology". The store's design and product range was completely reworked incorporating a more modern feel while removing all electrical componentry and much of its tools. These products were replaced with a larger range of Windows computers, gaming, televisions and Mac computers, much of which had previously been only sold in Powerhouse stores.

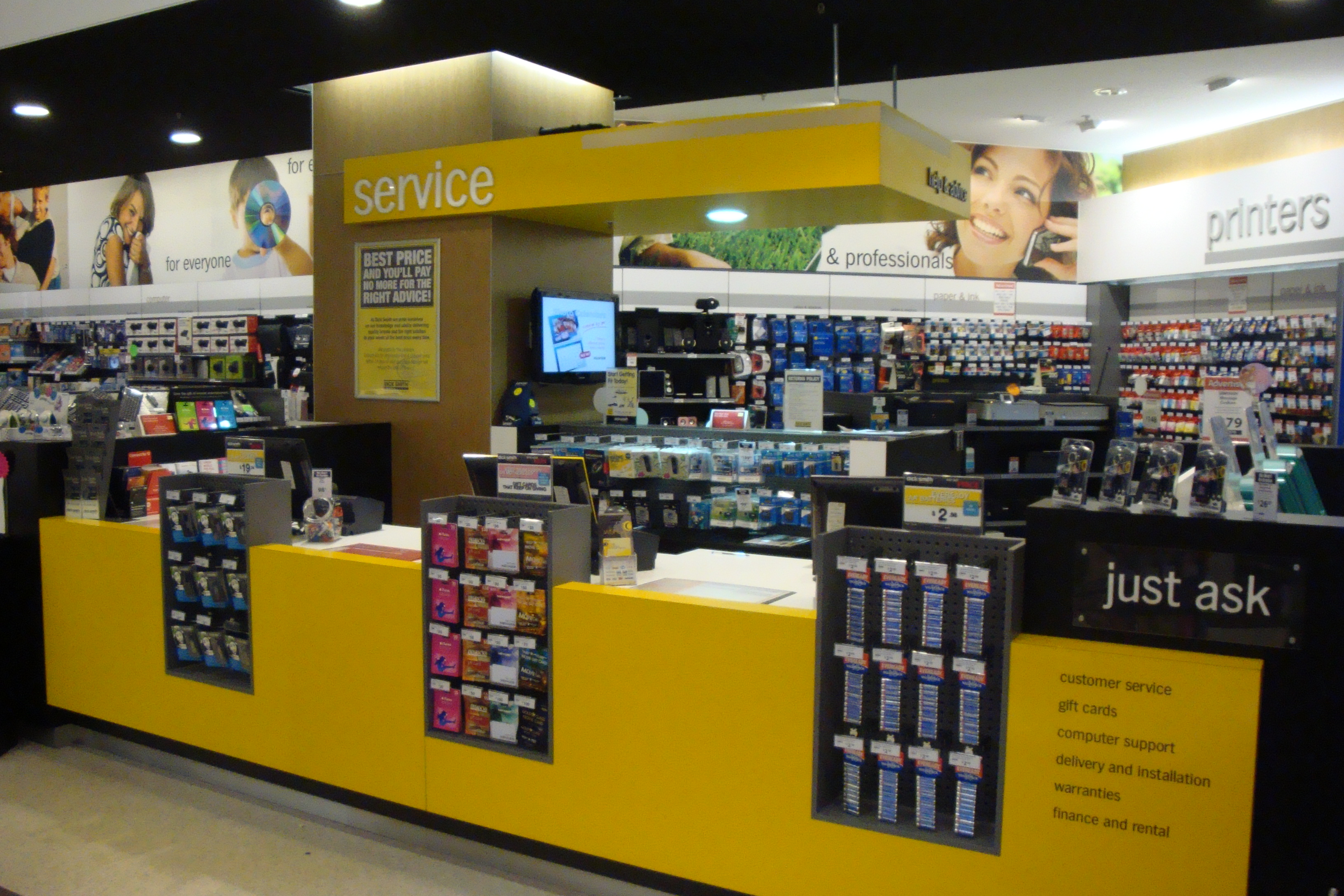
Inside the first Dick Smith concept store Hornsby DSE following its rebranding as Dick Smith Technology

Following further strategic review, the company decided to push forward with the new concept under the reworked "Dick Smith – Talk to the Techxperts" branding, merging all existing Dick Smith Electronics and Powerhouse stores under the same banner. In late 2008 the new Dick Smith logo and format was rolled out with many Powerhouse stores such as Macquarie Centre and Auburn being rebranded to fit the new unified company logo.

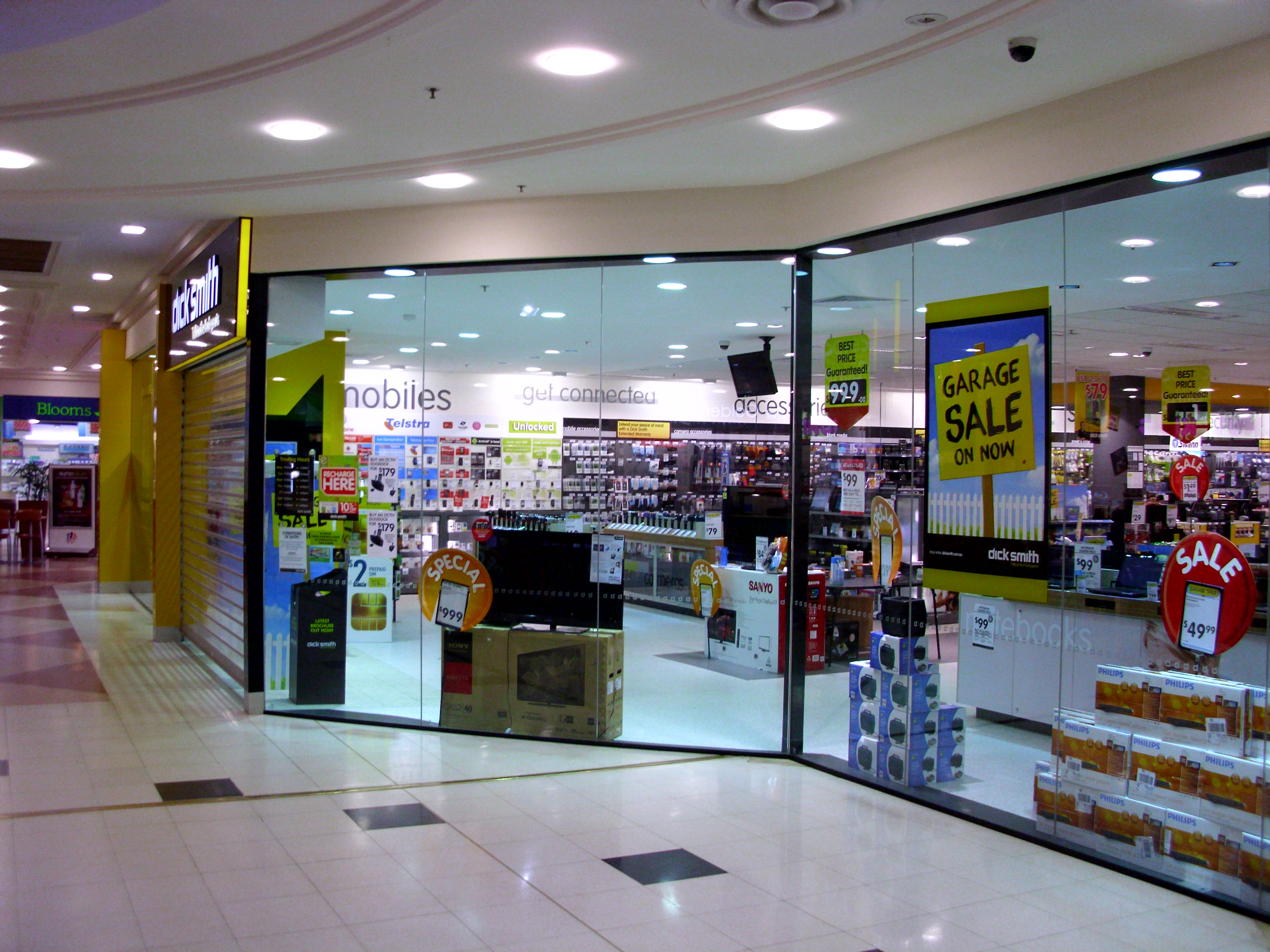
Newly branded Dick Smith outlet in the Sturt Mall, Wagga Wagga

"Large Format Stores" opened in Chadstone Shopping Centre and Bendigo, Marion, Perth, Innaloo, Rockingham, Hobart and Stockland Rockhampton under new "Dick Smith – Talk to the Techxperts" branding.

In March 2009, Woolworths CEO Michael Luscombe confirmed the end of Powerhouse as a separate entity, also adding that the company's third consumer electronics brand Tandy would be gradually phased out over the next three years as the stores' leases ended. This phase left "Dick Smith" as the sole brand in the parent company's consumer electronics division.

The mail-order catalogue so central to the company's success from the early days was last published in 2009, giving way to the online sales platform.

=== Acquisition by Anchorage Capital ===
On 31 January 2012, after nearly 30 years of ownership, Woolworths announced that after the results of a strategic review and a $300 million restructuring, it would close up to 100 Dick Smith stores and sell the business. The company was sold to Anchorage Capital Partners in September 2012, for an initial cash payment of $20 million and ultimate total price of some $115 million. It has been argued that Anchorage only put up $10 million in cash, the remainder of the funds being sourced from the business itself through liquidation of inventory, plant and equipment, and taking provision for future onerous lease payments, a process described as "the greatest private equity heist of all time". In November 2012, Nick Abboud was appointed CEO.

In December 2013, Dick Smith was floated by Anchorage on the Australian Securities Exchange (ASX), becoming a public company. At the time of the listing, the market capitalisation of the company was valued at $520 million, less than two years after Anchorage had purchased the company for $20 million. Anchorage initially retained 20% of the shares in the new company but had fully divested their holdings by September 2014.

==== Alliance with David Jones ====
From 1 October 2013, Dick Smith took over the operation of the home entertainment department in 30 David Jones retail stores in Australia and online. The venture traded under the banner "David Jones Electronics Powered by Dick Smith" and promoted televisions, computers, tablets, home office, audio-visual and other digital products, with employees and inventory transferred over to Dick Smith.

By the second half of 2014, sales were running at $1.4 billion per annum.

=== Fraud ===
Prior to bankruptcy, management used fraudulent accounting methods to acquire $125 million in loans falsely alleging it was needed to purchase stock for boxing day sales. CFO Michael Potts was found guilty and ordered to repay $43 million to the National Australia Bank in June 2021. Around the time of closing, it was widely considered one of the largest private-equity heists of all time, with Anchorage Capital ultimately turning $10m in to $520m in less than two years. (They added $10M from the Dick Smith business itself in order to pay the $20M purchase price). Multiple court cases and class actions resulted. The Australian Securities & Investments Commission was accused of failing to act, and chose not to publish their post mortem investigations.

=== Closure ===
A The Dick Smith Electronics store in Melbourne during the liquidation sale

On 4 January 2016, with the value of shares in Dick Smith Holdings having fallen by more than 80% since they were listed on the ASX in December 2013, a halt in trading was requested. The following day, Dick Smith Holdings Limited (and associated entities) was placed into administration by its major creditors National Australia Bank (NAB) and HSBC Bank Australia. McGrathNicol were appointed as administrators by the company's board but receivers Ferrier Hodgson were appointed by the creditors. CEO Nick Abboud stepped down on 12 January.

Having failed to secure a buyer for the stores, receivers Ferrier Hodgson announced, on 25 February 2016, that all 363 DSE stores in Australia and New Zealand would be closed, with the loss of 2,460 jobs.

On 15 March 2016 it was revealed that Kogan.com, the online retailer founded by Ruslan Kogan, had acquired the Dick Smith brand, trademarks, intellectual property, and its online business in Australia and New Zealand for an undisclosed price. The Dick Smith brand has been transitioned to an online-only store selling a wide variety of consumer items.

The last physical retail stores closed on 3 May 2016.

On 25 July 2016 Dick Smith Electronics' creditors placed what was then left of the company in liquidation. Creditors were expected to lose up to $260 million.

Though not connected with the company for 34 years, its founder Dick Smith expressed dismay at the closure and put it down to the "utter greed of modern capitalism".

== Outside Australia ==
=== Hong Kong ===
DSE's first foray offshore was the establishment Dick Smith Electronics (HK) Limited in Hong Kong in 1978. It operated a small buying office and one retail store, at two locations in Ashley Road, Tsim Sha Tsui, Hong Kong. The store targeted tourists generally and Australians, in particular, looking for tax-free DSE products. An international edition of the flagship catalogue was published in support of the operation. In the face of fierce competition from established local retailers and disappointing sales, the business closed in June 1980.

=== New Zealand ===
Dick Smith Electronics registered for business in New Zealand in 1981 and is believed to have opened a store the same year. In 1992, the company acquired and rebranded the retail business of David Reid Electronics, a similar chain that at one time consisted of about 30 stores. In some cases, this meant that for a time two Dick Smith stores operated in the same suburb.

In New Zealand, Dick Smith Electronics had over 75 locations. They included the "Powerhouse" stores, the first of which opened in Hamilton, followed by Manukau and Sylvia Park in Auckland, and Palmerston North. A third brand "Dick Smith Technology" store opened in Lower Hutt, following the same Powerhouse product range. Its e-commerce website had been using a search engine by SLI Systems that learns from what the users search for. The Powerhouse brand was discontinued in 2009.

=== United States ===
From 1980, DSE operated a small number of stores in the United States, in Northern California and Los Angeles, but had closed by the end of the decade.

== Sponsorships ==
DSE sponsored the Melbourne Stars in the T20 Big Bash League cricket, a number of tennis tournaments including the Hopman Cup, World Tennis Challenge, Brisbane International and the Sydney International.

The company was a sponsor of the National Rugby League nine-a-side tournament, the Auckland Nines and of the AFL club Richmond from 2008 until the end of 2011.

== See also ==
- Free Access Magazine
- Jaycar
