= Free Access Magazine =

Free Access Magazine is a free computer magazine distributed through major Australian consumer electronics retailers such Harvey Norman, Dick Smith Electronics and Myer. The magazine targets mainstream computer users and is designed to be easy to read. It covers PC and lifestyle technology.

== History and profile ==
Free Access Magazine was started by John Pospisil and Tom Crawley in 1997 in Sydney, Australia. The first issue of the magazine was issued in July 1998. It was distributed through major retail outlets, including Harvey Norman, Dick Smith Electronics and Myer.

The magazine became an online publication in October 2006.
