= Move (electronics store) =

- Type: Subsidiary
- Founded: 2014
- Defunct: 2016
- Fate: Liquidation of parent company
- Products: Fashion electronics
- Owner: Dick Smith Electronics

Move was an Australia chain of fashion electronics stores, owned by Dick Smith Electronics. The first store opened at Emporium Melbourne on April 16, 2014.

The stores closed in 2016 after Dick Smith Electronics entered receivership.
