= Silicon Chip =

Australian electronics magazine

- Silicon Chip cover, October 2014
- Publisher/Editor: Nicholas Vinen
- Categories: Electronics magazine
- Frequency: Monthly
- Publisher: Silicon Chip Publications
- Founded: 1987
- First issue: November 1987
- Country: Australia
- Based in: Collaroy, New South Wales
- Language: English
- Website: Silicon Chip
- ISSN: 1030-2662

Silicon Chip is an Australian electronics magazine. It was started in November, 1987 by Leo Simpson. Following the demise of Electronics Australia in 2000 and Diyode in 2024, it is the only hobbyist related electronics magazine remaining in Australia.

== Magazine ==
The magazine has features such as

- Projects to build
- Serviceman's Log
- Computer Features
- Vintage Radio
- Product Showcase
- Mailbag/Ask Silicon Chip
- Circuit Notebook (reader contributions)

The print version of Silicon Chip is produced and printed in Australia by Silicon Chip Publications Pty Ltd. The magazine is published monthly on the last Thursday of the month prior to the cover date.

Some time after Electronics Australia closed its doors, Silicon Chip Publications Pty Ltd purchased the titles Electronics Australia, Electronics Today (International), Radio, TV & Hobbies, Radio & Hobbies and Wireless Weekly, along with the copyright to original (non-submitted) material published in those magazines. The copyright of some submitted projects and articles for those old magazines technically still remains with the original authors. This is why Silicon Chip have not released Electronics Australia back-issues on CD, as they did with the older Radio TV & Hobbies. However they can provide an electronic copy of any Electronics Australia article for a price, which invalidates the previous reasoning. Except that copies are not provided in cases of articles where there is a question over the ownership of copyright.
