= EDUC-8 =

Early Australian hobby computer

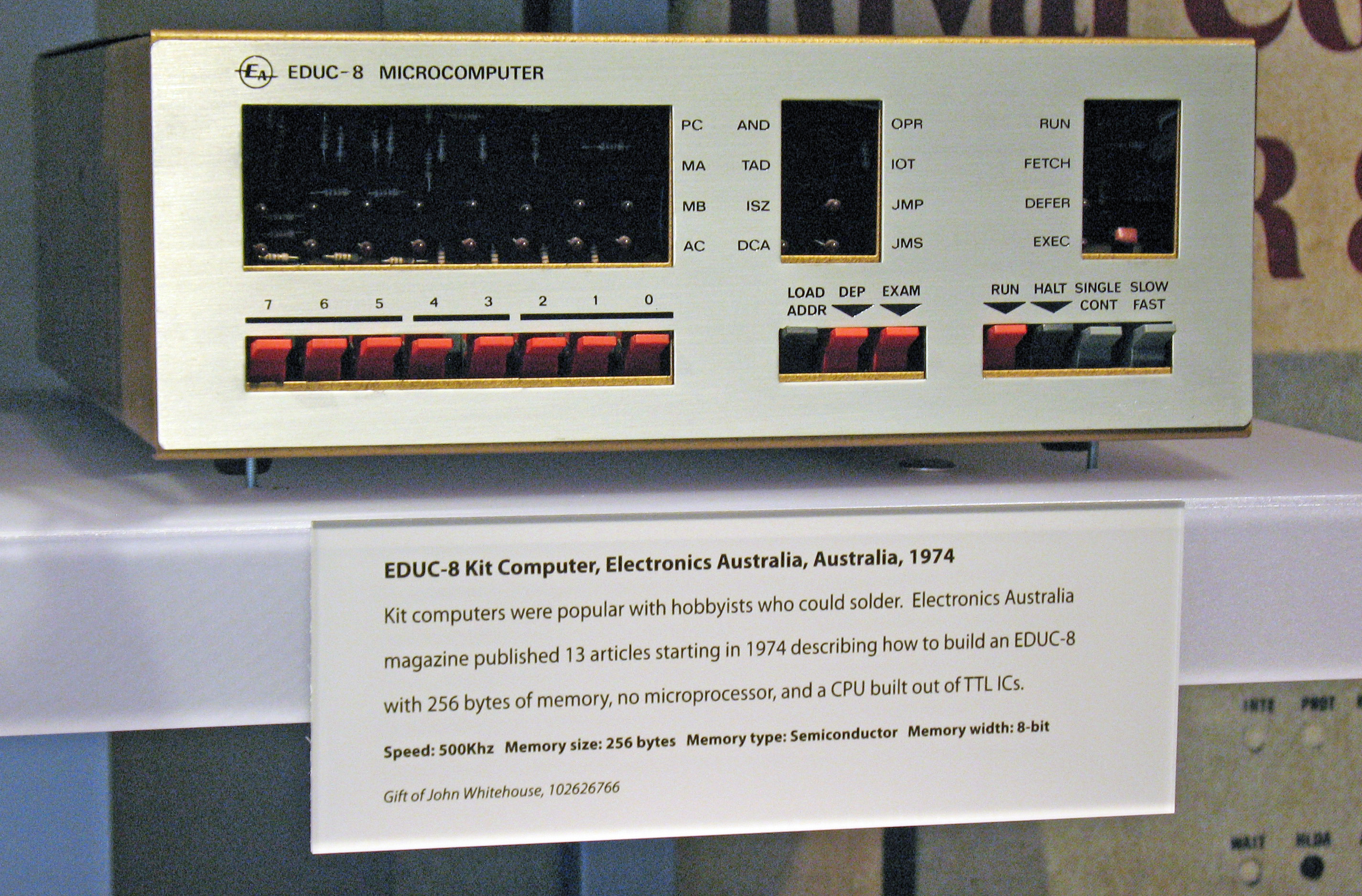
- EDUC-8 Microcomputer on display at the Computer History Museum.
- Manufacturer: Electronics Australia
- Type: microcomputer
- Released: August 1974; 51 years ago
- Memory: 256 bytes of RAM

The EDUC-8, pronounced "educate", is an early microcomputer kit published by Electronics Australia in a series of articles starting in August 1974 and continuing to August 1975. Electronics Australia initially believed that it was the first such kit, but later discovered that Radio-Electronics had just beaten it with their Mark-8 by one month. However, Electronics Australia staff believed that their TTL design was superior to the Mark-8, as it did not require the purchase of an expensive microprocessor chip.

The EDUC-8 is an 8-bit bit-serial design with 32 to 256 bytes of RAM. The internal clock speed is 500 kHz, with an instruction speed of approximately 10 kHz, due to the bit-serial implementation. The instruction set was a subset of the DEC PDP-8, though it was missing quite a few of the PDP-8’s instructions and some important flags. This was essentially an education machine designed to put people on a path to understanding how a computer worked and how to start programming what was at the time, a common computer in the market.

The EDUC-8 has front panel lights and switches to program the computer. Unlike the MITS Altair 8800, the EDUC-8 included two serial input and two serial output ports at the back of the computer. The later articles included a variety of peripherals, allowing the computer to interface to a keypad, octal display, paper tape loader, paper tape puncher, printer, keyboard, music player, teleprinter, magnetic tape recorder and alphanumeric display. The articles were collected into a book, where additional information was published detailing how to expand the number of I/O ports to 256, adding up to 32KB of additional memory, and using the computer to control various switches. When republishing the documentation that described the construction and programming of the EDUC-8 (refer Reference 1 below) the expansion material such as paper tape devices and printer was then included.

The designer Jamieson Rowe described the EDUC-8 as:

Perhaps the best way to start is by describing the computer as a scaled-down version of the Digital Equipment PDP-8 machine -at least, in terms of its instruction repertoire and basic console layout. It has the same eight basic types of instructions, and for convenience I have used the same mnemonic names and similar coding.

Like the PDP-8 this machine was equipped with the same register arrangement. Program counter, Memory Address, Memory Buffer, Accumulator and Switch Register which made programming largely the same as the original.
