= Texet Sales =

UK consumables company

- Headquarters: Manchester, United Kingdom

The Hira Company Ltd (incorporating Texet Sales Ltd) is a family-owned UK company based in Manchester, England specialising in the import and distribution of consumables.

Their subsidiary Texet was founded in the 1970s and focuses on calculators and electronic gadgets. It was partly responsible for driving Sinclair out of the pocket calculator market, often with devices manufactured in Far Eastern countries such as Hong Kong and South Korea. In 1983, the original Texet business went into receivership, and its assets and name were acquired by Hira Ltd.

The company still sells calculators and similar devices under the Texet name and- as of 2006- claimed to have 26% of the UK calculator market.
