= Electronics Australia =

- Categories: Electronics
- Frequency: Monthly
- Publisher: Federal Publishing Company
- First issue: April 1965; 61 years ago
- Final issue Number: March 2000; 26 years ago 432
- Company: FPC Magazines
- Country: Australia
- Based in: Sydney
- Language: English

Electronics Australia or EA was Australia's longest-running general electronics magazine. It was based in Chippendale, New South Wales.

== Publication history ==
It can claim to trace its history to 1922 when the Wireless Weekly magazine was formed. Its content was a mix of general and technical articles on the new topic of radio.

In April 1939 the magazine became monthly and was renamed Radio and Hobbies. As its name suggests, it was a more technical publication for hobbyists, but it also featured articles on television, optics, music and aviation. Nonetheless its base was radio, and it contained many how-to-build projects. The first editor was John Moyle, from 1947 to 1960.

With the advent of television, television was added to its title in February 1955, Radio Television & Hobbies, or RTV&H. During these years numerous how-to-build articles on high fidelity audio, amateur radio and even electronic organs and television sets were published. The growing fields of scientific, medical, computing and other applications of electronics necessitated a name change to Electronics Australia in April 1965 (being Volume 27, Number 1).

Electronics Australia published a number of innovative computer construction projects, including the Educ-8 in 1974, the Mini Scamp, the Dream 6800 and the Super-80 - a joint venture with Dick Smith Electronics.

Although many competitors came and went during the 1970s and 1980s, such as Electronics Today International, Australian Electronics Monthly, and Talking Electronics, Electronics Australia survived into the 2000s.

For a couple of years, more consumer electronics items were introduced, and continued to occupy more of the magazine, while the magazine's technical material occupied the rear pages. Possibly due to this reduction in importance of technical slant, several of the magazine's staff (including the Editor, Leo Simpson) left to start the magazine that would become its main rival, Silicon Chip, in 1987.

Under newly installed editor Graham Cattley, a change of name to Electronics Australia Today in April 2001 spelt the death knell. Most technical content was removed and EAT changed focus to become a fully consumer-oriented publication, although this consumer change was noticeable since April 2000, when the name was changed from Electronics Australia to simply EA, with the Electronics Australia name remaining a subtitle for several issues before it was dropped entirely. This was a new fresher consumer look, with square glued binding instead of the traditional stapled binding. Many long-time readers considered the name change from Electronics Australia to EA to be the end of the traditional Electronics Australia look and brand. Original readers and advertisers finally deserted in droves when the name was changed to EAT and the magazine failed to pick up new readers (there were already many established magazines covering consumer electronics). EAT lasted only six issues before it folded.

The last issue with Electronics Australia as the main title was published March 2000. There were 432 issues in all up until December 2000.

The rights to Electronics Australia are now owned by Silicon Chip. Silicon Chip have not released back issues on CD as they have done with Wireless Weekly and Radio TV&Hobbies due to not having contracts with most of the freelance article contributors over the years, who technically still own copyright on their respective articles and construction projects.

== List of editors ==
Name	Date
Florence McKenzie	1922
John Moyle	1947 - March 1960
Neville Williams	April 1960 - March 1971
Jamieson Rowe	April 1971 - November 1979
Leo Simpson	December 1979 - June 1987
Jamieson Rowe	July 1987 - August 1999
Graham Cattley	September 1999 - April 2001 (when it became EAT)

(incomplete)
