= List of home computers =

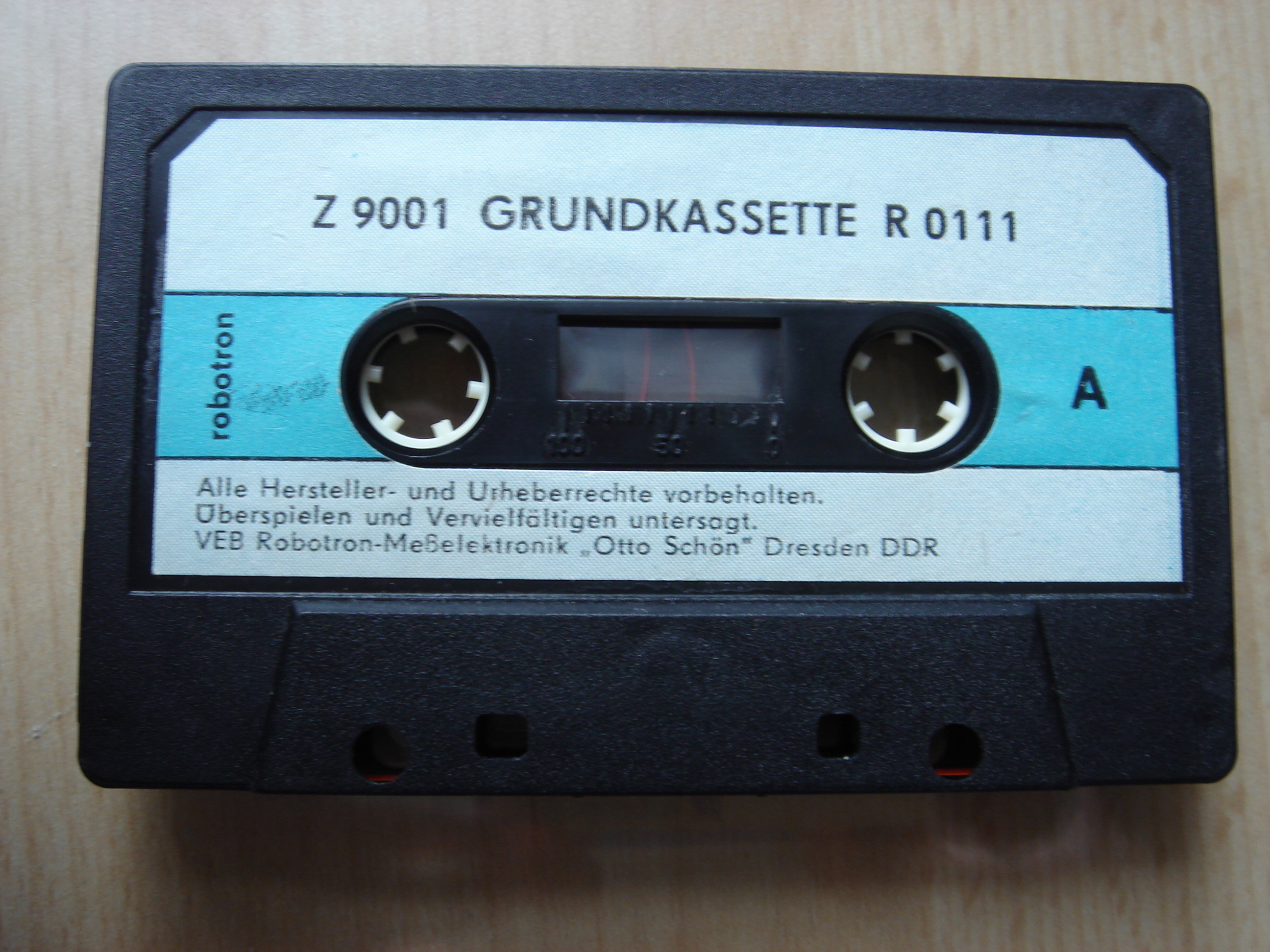
The cassette tape was a common low-cost and low-performance mass storage device for a generation of home computers.

Home computers were a class of microcomputer that existed from 1977 to about 1995. During this time it made economic sense for manufacturers to make microcomputers aimed at the home user. By simplifying the machines, and making use of household items such as television sets and cassette recorders instead of dedicated computer peripherals, the home computer allowed the consumer to own a computer at a fraction of the price of computers oriented to small business. Today, the price of microcomputers has dropped to the point where there's no advantage to building a separate, incompatible series just for home users.

While many office-type personal computers were used in homes, in this list a "home computer" is a factory-assembled mass-marketed consumer product, usually at significantly lower cost than contemporary business computers. It would have an alphabetic keyboard and a multi-line alphanumeric display, the ability to run both games software as well as commercial and user-written application software, and some removable mass storage device (such as cassette tape or floppy disk).

This list excludes smartphones, personal digital assistants, pocket computers, laptop computers, programmable calculators and pure video game consoles. Single-board development or evaluation boards, intended to demonstrate a microprocessor, are excluded since these were not marketed to general consumers.

Pioneering kit and assembled hobby microcomputers which generally required electronics skills to build or operate are listed separately, as are computers intended primarily for use in schools. A hobby-type computer often would have required significant expansion of memory and peripherals to make it useful for the usual role of a factory-made home computer. School computers usually had facilities to share expensive peripherals such as disk drives and printers, and often had provision for central administration.

== Attributes ==
Attributes are as typically advertised by the original manufacturer. Popular machines inspired third-party sources for adapters, add-on processors, mass storage, and other peripherals.

"Processor" indicates the microprocessor chip that ran the system. A few home computers had multiple processors, generally used for input/output devices. Processor speeds were not a competitive point among home computer manufacturers, and typically the processor ran either at its maximum rated speed ( between 1 and 4 MHz for most processor types here), or at some fraction of the television color subcarrier signal, for economy of design. Since a crystal oscillator was necessary for stable color, it was often also used as the microprocessor clock source. Many processors were second-sourced, with different manufacturers making the same device under different part numbers. Variations of a basic part number might have been used to indicate minor variations in speed or transistor type, or might indicate fairly significant alterations to the prototype's capabilities. In the Eastern Bloc countries, manufacturers made functional duplicates of Western microprocessors under different part number series.

TV indicates the factory configuration produces composite video compatible with a home TV receiver. Some computers came with a built-in RF modulator to allow connection to the TV receiver antenna terminals; others output composite video for use with a free-standing monitor or external RF modulator. Still others had built-in or proprietary monitors. Often a composite video monitor (monochrome or color) would be substituted for the family TV. Some standard types of video controller ICs were popular, but see the very detailed List of home computers by video hardware for a discussion of video capabilities of different models. Memory and TV bandwidth restrictions meant that typical home computers had only a few color choices and perhaps 20 lines of 40 characters of text as an upper limit to their video capabilities. Where the same model was sold in countries using PAL or NTSC television standards, sometimes there would be minor variations in the speed of the processor, because NTSC and PAL use different frequencies for the color information and the crystal for the video system was often also used for the processor clock.

Base mass storage was whatever came in the basic configuration. Some machines had built-in cassette drives or optional external drives, others relied on the consumer to provide a cassette recorder. Cassette recorders had the primary virtue of being widely available as a consumer product at the time. Typically a home computer would generate audio tones to encode data, that could be stored on audio tape through a direct connection to the recorder. Re-loading the data required re-winding the tape. The home computer would contain some circuit such as a phase-locked loop to convert audio tones back into digital data. Since consumer cassette recorders were not made for remote control, the user would have to manually operate the recorder in response to prompts from the computer. Random access to data on a cassette was impossible, since the entire tape would have to be searched to retrieve any particular item. A few manufacturers integrated a cassette tape drive or cassette-like tape mechanism into the console, but these variants were made obsolete by the reduction in cost of floppy diskette drives.

Floppy disk drives were initially very costly compared to the system purchase price. Plug-in ROM cartridges containing game or application software were popular in earlier home computers since they were easier to use, faster, and more reliable than cassette tapes. Once diskette drives became available at low cost, cartridges declined in popularity since they were more expensive to manufacture than reproducing a diskette, and had comparatively small capacity compared to diskettes. A few cartridges contained battery-backed memory that allowed users to save data (for example, game high scores) between uses of the cartridge.

Typically there were several models or variants within a product line, especially to account for different international video standards and power supplies; see the linked articles for variants and consequences of variations. "Compatibility" indicates some measure of compatibility with a parent type, however, sometimes incompatibility existed even within a product family. A "clone" system has identical hardware and is functionally interchangeable with its prototype; a few clone systems relied on illicit copies of system ROMs to make them functional.

== Manufacturers and models ==
Home computer models and manufacturers
Origin	Manufacturer	Model	Processor	Year	Video type	Mass storage	Video chip (see list)	Compatibility	Remarks	Ref
UK	Acorn Computers	Atom	6502	1980	TV	Cassette	6847			
UK	Acorn Computers	BBC Micro	6502	1981	TV, RGB, composite video	Cassette, diskette option	6845, SAA5050 Teletext		Optional processor boards; Several models, see article	
UK	Acorn Computers	Electron	6502	1983	TV, RGB, composite video	Cassette, cartridge option, diskette option	Custom ULA "Aberdeen"	BBC Micro		
UK	Acorn Computers	BBC Master	65SC12	1986	TV, RGB, composite video	Diskette, cassette, cartridge	6845, SAA5050 Teletext	BBC Micro	Several models, also sold as Olivetti Prodest PC128S	
UK	Acorn Computers	Archimedes	ARM RISC	1987	RGB Monitor	Diskette, hard drive			several models	
UK	Acorn Computers	A7000	ARM RISC	1995	RGB Monitor	Diskette, hard drive		Acorn Archimedes		
UK	Amstrad	CPC 464, 664, 6128	Z80	1984	dedicated mono or RGB monitor	cassette, diskette	6845 and custom LSI "Gate Array"		Several models	
UK	Amstrad	464 Plus, 6128 Plus	Z80	1990	dedicated mono or RGB monitor	cassette, diskette, cartridge	Custom ASIC	Amstrad CPC 464	Several models	
UK	Amstrad	PCW	Z80	1985	dedicated integrated monochrome	diskette			Several successive models	
UK	Amstrad	PC1512	8086	1986	dedicated mono or RGB Monitor	Diskette, hard drive		IBM PC	PC compatible aimed at the home market	
China	Tsinghua University and other department	CEC-I Zhonghua teaching machine	6502	1986	TV	cassette, 5.25-inch floppy		Apple	64 KB RAM, 32 KB ROM (BASIC, LOGO)	
USA	APF Electronics, Inc.	Imagination Machine	6800	1979	TV	Cassette, optional floppy, cartridge			Expansion pack for a video game console that provided programmability	
USA	Apple Computer	Apple II	6502	1977	Monitor, TV	Cassette, optional floppy			Several models, several descendants, and many third-party clones	
USA	Apple Computer	Apple IIe	6502	1983	Monitor, TV	Cassette, optional floppy		Apple		
USA	Apple Computer	Apple IIc	65C02	1984	Monitor, TV	floppy disk drive		Apple	Portable, but not integrated like a modern laptop	
USA	Apple Computer	Apple IIc Plus	65C02	1988	Monitor, TV	floppy disk drive		Apple	Portable, but not integrated like a modern laptop	
USA	Apple Computer	Apple II Plus	6502	1979	Monitor, TV	floppy disk drive		Apple		
USA	Apple Computer	Apple IIGS	65C816	1986	Monitor, TV	floppy disk, optional hard drive		Apple		
USA	Apple Computer	Macintosh	68000	1984	Monitor	diskette, optional CD ROM				
UK	Apricot Computers/Applied Computer Technology	Apricot F1	8088	1984	Monitor	floppy disk		MS-DOS	Ran MS-DOS but not IBM compatible; several descendant models	
Netherlands	Aster Computers	CT-80	Z80	1982	Monitor	floppy disk		TRS-80	Newdos-80 CP/M Videotex terminal, Various models	
USA	Atari, Inc.	Atari 8-bit computers	6502B, late 400/800s and XL/XEs use a Custom 6502 variant called "Sally"	1979–1987	TV	Cassette, optional floppy disk, cartridge	ANTIC+CTIA/GTIA custom LSI		Also used as cartridge video game consoles	
USA	Atari Corporation	Atari ST	68000	1985	Monitor, TV	Floppy disk, optional hard disk	Custom LSI		Several related models	
USA	Atari Corporation	Atari TT	68030	1990	Monitor	Floppy disk, hard disk	Custom LSI	Atari ST	Several related models	
USA	Atari Corporation	Falcon	68030 + 56001	1992	Monitor, TV	Floppy disk, hard disk	Custom LSI	Atari ST Compatibility modes	Some models has been modified and sold under license with C-Lab brand	
USA	Bally Consumer Products	Bally Brain video game/home computer	Z80	1979	TV	Cassette, cartridge			A video game console with programmability	
USA	Bally Consumer Products	Bally Astrocade	Z80	1977	TV	Cassette, cartridge			A video game console with programmability, several models and revisions	
Romania	Brasov Computer	CoBra	Z80	1986	Monitor	Cassette, diskette		ZX Spectrum	CP/M	
UK	Camputers	Lynx	Z80	1983	Monitor	Cassette	6845		Several related models	
Various	Various manufacturers	Various models	Z80	1983	TV	Cassette, optional floppy, cartridge	TMS 9918	MSX standard		
USA	Coleco	Adam	Z80	1983	Monitor, TV	Cassette (custom built-in), optional floppies	TMS9928A	Colecovision console, Applesoft BASIC, optional CP/M		
USA	Commodore	PET	6502	1977	Built-in monochrome monitor	Cassette			Several 6502 descendants, more or less compatible	
USA	Commodore	VIC-20	6502	1980	TV	Optional cassette, optional floppy, cartridge	VIC custom LSI		PET-style BASIC, extended	
USA	Commodore	Commodore 64	6510	1982	TV	Optional cassette, optional floppy, cartridge	VIC II custom LSI		Optional dual processor in cartridge could run CP/M plus version 3.0	
USA	Commodore	Commodore SX-64	6510	1982	Built-in color monitor	Built-in floppy, optional cassette, cartridge	VIC II custom LSI	Commodore 64	Portable with keyboard that attached to cover monitor and disk drive	
USA	Commodore	MAX Machine	6510	1982	TV	Optional cassette, cartridge	VIC II custom LSI	VIC-20		
USA	Commodore	Commodore 16 and 116	8501 (6502)	1984	TV	Optional cassette, optional floppy, cartridge	TED custom LSI			
USA	Commodore	Plus/4	8501 (6502)	1984	TV	Optional cassette, optional floppy, cartridge	TED custom LSI	Commodore 16		
USA	Commodore	Commodore 128	8502 (6502)/ Z80	1985	TV	Optional cassette, optional 5.25-inch floppy, optional 3.5-inch floppy, cartridge	VIC II and MOS 8563 custom LSI	C64 compatibility mode	Dual processor could run CP/M plus version 3.0	
USA	Commodore	Amiga	68000	1985	Monitor, composite video	Diskette, optional hard drive	Custom LSI		Several models with 680X0 family processors	
Hong Kong	Comx World Operations	Comx-35	RCA 1802	1983	TV	Cassette, optional floppy disk	CDP 1879			
Belgium	Data Applications International	DAI Personal Computer	8080	1980	TV	Cassette, optional floppy disk	Programmable Graphics Generator custom LSI			
Hong Kong	Vtech	VTech Laser 200	Z80	1985	TV	Cassette, optional floppy disk	6847		Also sold by Dick Smith as the VZ200 and by others under other names	
Hong Kong	EACA	Video Genie family	Z80	1980–1982	TV	Cassette, optional floppy disk		TRS 80 Model 1 (mostly)	Rebadged and sold by others, see article	
Hong Kong	EACA	Colour Genie	Z80	1983	TV	Cassette, optional floppy disk, cartridge	6845	TRS 80 Model 1 (mostly)	Rebadged and sold by others, see article	
Hong Kong	Rabbit	Rabbit RX83	Z80	1983	TV	Cassette	6847	GEM 1000	Rebadged and sold by others, see article	
Czechoslovakia	Didaktik	Alpha, Beta	Z80	1986	TV	Cassette, optional floppy disk		PMD 85		
Czechoslovakia	Didaktik	Gama	Z80	1987	TV	Cassette, optional floppy disk		ZX Spectrum	Also M and portable variants, see article	
UK	Dragon Data	Dragon 32/64	6809	1982	TV, composite video	Cassette, optional floppy disk	6847	Radio Shack Color Computer		
USSR	Dubna	Dubna 48K	Z80 (compatible)	1991	TV	Cassette, optional floppy disk	Custom LSI	ZX Spectrum		
USSR	Elektronika	BK-0010	PDP 11 (compatible)	1985	TV	Cassette, optional/homemade floppy disk	Custom LSI			
USSR	AGAT	AGAT-9	Native/Apple II compatible	1984	TV/Monitor	Floppy disk	Custom LSI	Agat computer	Agat computer	
Serbia	Elektronska Industrija Niš	Pecom 32, Pecom 64	RCA 1802	1985	TV	Cassette	CDP 1869	COMX-35		
France	Exelvision	EXL 100	TMS 7020	1984	Monitor	Cartridge, Cassette, Disquette optional	TMS 3556		Used infrared connection for keyboard and joystick	
USA	Exidy	Exidy Sorcerer	Z80	1978	Monitor	Cassette, optional 3rd party expansion to diskettes				
UK	Locurnals/Intelligent Software	Enterprise 64 and 128	Z80	1985	TV, monitor	Cassette,	Custom ASIC "Nick"			
Hong Kong	Lambda Electronics	Lambda 8300	Z80	1985	TV	Cassette,		ZX80, ZX81	ZX81 compatible also sold as PC8300, Power 3000 and BASIC 2000	
USA	Various manufacturers	Apple II clones	6502	1979	TV, monitor	Cassette, optional diskette		Apple II	Many anonymous or obscure companies made copies of the Apple II, some illegally duplicating the Apple ROM contents	
USA	Franklin Computer Corporation	Franklin ACE series	6502	1982	TV, monitor	Diskette, cassette		Apple II		
Japan	Fujitsu	FM Towns series	80386SX	1989	Monitor	CD ROM, optional hard drive		Semi Windows compatible	Almost a video game console	
Japan	Fujitsu	FM-7 series	6809	1982	TV	Diskette		Radio Shack Color Computer	Several models	
Belgium	GEM (Groupement européen d'études)	GEM 1000 also known as GEM 1000 Junior Computer, and the French Charlemagne 999	Z80	1985	TV, monitor	Cassette, cartridge	6847		French BASIC for the Charlemagne, but uses QWERTY	
UK	Grundy Business Systems	Grundy NewBrain	Z80	1982	TV, monitor, built-in 1-line display	Cassette, Floppy diskette		Radio Shack Color Computer BASIC	Several models	
Brazil	Gradiente	Gradiente Expert	Z80	1985	TV, RGB monitor	Cassette, cartridge, diskette expansion available		MSX compatible	Several models	
USA	Honeywell	Honeywell 316#Kitchen Computer	DDP 16 Minicomputer	1969	Binary lights	None offered (contemporary systems would have used paper tape)	No video		Honorary home computer, marketed but never sold.	
USA	IBM	IBM PC	8088	1981	Monitor	Cassette, floppy diskette, optional CD Rom	CGA, EGA, VGA			
USA	IBM	PCjr	8088	1984	Monitor, composite video	Cassette, floppy diskette, cartridge	VGA	IBM PC		
USA	IBM	IBM PS/1	8088	1990	Monitor	Floppy diskette, hard drive		IBM PC		
USA	Interact	Interact Home Computer	8080	1979	TV	Cassette				
USA	Intelligent Systems Corporation	Compucolor II	8080	1977	TV	Diskette (I: 8-track)				
USSR	Intercompex	Hobbit	Z80 compatible	1990	TV, monitor	Cassette, floppy drive		ZX Spectrum	Several models for export and home markets	
USSR	Iskra	Iskra-1030	8086 compatible	1989		floppy drive				
Croatia	Ivasim	Ivel Ultra	6502 compatible	1984		floppy drive		Apple II		
Croatia	Ivasim	Ivel Z3	6502 compatible	1983+	Built-in monitor	floppy drive		Apple IIe		
UK	Jupiter Cantab	Ace	Z80	1982	TV	Cassette, 3rd party diskette	custom ASIC		FORTH instead of BASIC	
Sweden	Luxor	ABC 80	Z80	1978	TV	Cassette, 3rd party diskette			also made in Budapest, ABC 800 office versions had disk drives	
USA	Mattel	Aquarius	Z80	1983	TV	Cassette, cartridge				
France	Matra	Matra Alice	6803	1983	TV	Cassette		Radio Shack TRS 80 MC 10		
UK	Memotech	Memotech MTX500, MTX512, RS128	Z80	1983	TV, monitor	Cassette, diskette, hard drive, cartridge				
Australia	Microbee Systems	MicroBee series	Z80	1983	TV, monitor	Cassette, later models floppy diskette,	6545		Several models	
Brazil	Comércio de Componentes Eletrônicos	CCE MC-1000	Z80	1985	TV, monitor	Cassette, cartridge	6847	GEM 1000	Probably based on Belgian GEM 1000 followed up by MC-4000	
Brazil	Microdigital Eletronica	TK82C series	Z80	1985	TV, monitor	Cassette, cartridge		ZX80, ZX81	TK90X Several models	
France	Micronique	Hector 1	8080	1979	TV	Cassette		Interact Home Computer		
UK	Miles Gordon Technology	SAM Coupé	Z80	1989	Monitor, composite video	Floppy diskette,	Custom ASIC			
Taiwan	Multitech	Microprofessor III	6502	1983	TV, Monitor	Floppy diskette, cassette		Apple IIe		
USA	Mindset Corporation	Mindset	80186	1984	Monitor	Floppy diskette		IBM PC semi-compatible		
USA	Montgomery Ward	CyberVision 2001	RCA 1802	1978	Monitor	Cassette				
Japan	NEC	NEC PC-100	8086	1983	Monitor	Floppy diskette,		MS-DOS	Various models, many too costly for home market	
Japan	NEC Home Electronics	PC-6000 series	Z80	1981	TV, Monitor	Cassette, cartridge			Several models	
Japan	NEC	PC-8000 series	Z80	1979	RGB Monitor	Cassette, later models with floppy diskettes,				
Japan	NEC	PC-8800 series	Z80	1981	RGB Monitor	Cassette, later models with floppy diskettes,			Several models, also called PC-88	
Japan	NEC	PC-9800 series	8086	1982	RGB Monitor	floppy diskettes, diskettes, CD ROM optional			Several models, also called PC-98	
USA	Radio Shack	TRS-80 Color Computer CoCo, Coco 2, Coco 3	6809	1980	Monitor	Cassette, floppy diskette, cartridge			Several models	
USA	Radio Shack	TRS-80 Model I	Z80	1977	Monitor (built in)	Cassette, optional floppy diskette			See List of TRS-80 clones. Later models aimed more at hobby/small business, but this one was priced like a home computer.	
USA	Radio Shack	TRS-80 MC-10	6803	1983	TV	Cassette,	6847		See also Matra Alice	
USA	Radio Shack	Tandy 1000 series	8088 (depends on model)	1987	TV, Monitor	Cassette, floppy diskette		IBM PC Jr	Several models in series	
USA	RCA	COSMAC VIP	RCA 1802	1977	Monitor	Cassette				
Germany	Schneider Computer Division	Euro PC	8088	1988	Monitor	Floppy diskette	Hercules, CGA	IBM PC XT	Several descendant models including 80286 and 80386SX processor and EGA, VGA adapters	
UK	Oric Int'l/Tangerine	Oric-1	6502	1983	TV, Monitor	Cassette, optional floppy drive	semi-custom ASIC (ULA)			
UK	Oric Int'l/Tangerine	Oric Atmos	6502	1984	TV, Monitor	Cassette, optional floppy drive	semi-custom ASIC (ULA)	Oric-1		
UK	Oric Int'l/Tangerine	Oric Telestrat	6502	1986	TV, Monitor	Cassette, optional floppy drive, ROM based Cartridge	semi-custom ASIC (ULA)	Oric-1		
Croatia	PEL Varaždin	Galeb	6502	1981	TV, Monitor	Cassette				
Croatia	PEL Varaždin	Orao	6502	1984	TV, Monitor	Cassette				
Netherlands	Philips	P2000	Z80	1980	TV, Monitor	Cassette, optional floppy diskette, cartridge	Teletext chip		Several models, disk models fairly costly by home computer standards	
Netherlands	Philips	G7480	Z80	1983	TV	Cassette, cartridge		Magnavox Odyssey 2	Home computer expansion module for G7400 game console	
Netherlands	Philips	VG5000	Z80	1986	TV, Monitor	Cassette				
Netherlands	Philips	Philips :YES	80186	1985	Monitor	Floppy diskette		IBM PC semi-compatible		
Bulgaria	Pravetz	Pravetz series 8, including -83, -83, -84, -8M/E/A/S.	CM630 (6502 clone)	1985	TV, Monitor	Cassette, floppy diskette		Apple II	Several models, company later made IBM PC compatibles.	
Bulgaria	Pravetz	Pravetz 8D	6502	1982	TV, Monitor	Cassette, floppy diskette		Oric-1/Atmos		
Bulgaria	Pravetz	IMKO-1	6502	1980	TV, Monitor	Cassette, floppy diskette		Apple II	High cost compared to later Western home computers	
New Zealand	Progeni Systems / Polycorp	Poly-1	6809	1981	Built-in colour monitor	Floppy diskette	SAA5050 Teletext			
Brazil	Prológica	Prológica CP-400	6809	1984	TV, Monitor	Cassette, floppy diskette		Radio Shack Color Computer		
East Germany	VEB Robotron	KC 85	Z80 compatible	1984	TV	Cassette			Theoretically available to consumers.	
East Germany	VEB Robotron	KC 87	Z80 compatible	1987	TV	Cassette, cartridge			Theoretically available to consumers	
East Germany	VEB Robotron	Z1013	Z80 compatible	1985	TV	Cassette			Order queue of one year and collection in person only.	
South Korea	Samsung	SPC-1000	Z80	1983	dedicated mono or RGB monitor	cassette				
South Korea	Samsung	SPC-1500	Z80	1987	dedicated mono or RGB monitor	cassette		Sharp X1		
Japan	Sega	SC-3000	Z80 compatible	1983	TV	Cassette, cartridge, optional floppy				
Japan	Sega	AI Computer	NEC V20	1986	TV	cartridge				
Japan	Sharp	MZ series	Z80 compatible	1979	TV	Cassette, cartridge, optional floppy			Many models in the series, escalating to small business systems	
Japan	Sharp	Sharp X1	Z80 compatible	1982	TV, dedicated monitor	Cassette, cartridge, optional floppy			Several models	
Japan	Sharp	X68000	68000	1987	Monitor	Floppy diskette, optional hard disk			Several models	
UK	Sinclair Research	ZX80	Z80	1980	TV	Cassette	Custom ASIC		Initially also available as a kit, and see MicroAce for an unlicensed knock-off	
UK	Sinclair Research	ZX81	Z80	1981	TV	Cassette	Custom ASIC	ZX80	See also List of ZX80/81 clones and Timex Sinclair	
UK	Sinclair Research	ZX Spectrum	Z80	1982	TV	Cassette, later models floppy diskette	Custom ASIC		See List of ZX Spectrum clones	
UK	Sinclair Research	Sinclair QL	68008	1984	TV, monitor	"Microdrive" tape	ZX8301 Custom ASIC		Spin-off to several related products, see List of Sinclair QL clones	
Japan	Sord Computer Corporation	Sord M200 Smart Home Computer	Z80	1977	TV	Floppy disk				
Japan	Sord Computer Corporation CGL Home Computers	Sord M5 CGL M5	Z80	1982	TV	Cassette, optional floppy disk				
USA	Spectravideo	SV-318	Z80	1983	TV	Cassette, floppy disk	Custom ASIC			
Taiwan	Tatung	Tatung Einstein	Z80	1984	dedicated monitor	floppy disk				
New Zealand	Technosys	Aamber Pegasus	6809	1984	TV, monitor	Cassette			Educational network version made	
USA	Texas Instruments	TI-99/4, TI-99/4A	TMS9900	1979	TV, monitor	Cassette, optional floppy disk drive	TMS9918		Several models, more common 4A in 1981; some compatibles made by others	
Czechoslovakia	Tesla	PMD 85	8080	1985	TV, monitor	Cassette				
Czechoslovakia	Štátny majetok Závadka š.p., Závadka nad Hronom	MAŤO	8080	1989	TV, monitor	Cassette		PMD 85	Also made as a kit	
France	Thomson	TO7	6809	1982	TV, monitor	Cassette, cartridge				
France	Thomson	MO5 aka Olivetti Prodest PC128	6809	1984	TV, monitor	Cassette, cartridge			Successor model MO6 in 1986, and others	
USA/ UK/ Portugal	Timex Sinclair	Timex Sinclair 1000 and 1500	Z80	1982	TV, monitor	Cassette, optional cartridge		ZX80, ZX81		
USA/ UK/ Portugal	Timex Sinclair	Timex Sinclair 2048	Z80	1984	TV	Cassette, cartridge	Custom ULA	ZX Spectrum		
Portugal	Timex Sinclair	Timex Computer 2048	Z80	1984	TV	Cassette, cartridge	Custom ULA	ZX Spectrum		
USA/ UK/ Portugal	Timex Sinclair	Timex Computer 2068	Z80	1983	TV	Cassette, cartridge	Custom ULA	ZX Spectrum	Several related models	
Portugal/ Poland	Timex Sinclair	Komputer 2086	Z80	1986	TV	Cassette, cartridge, optional floppy diskette	Custom ULA	Sinclair 2068		
Japan	Tomy	Tomy Tutor (US) /Grandstand Tutor (UK)	TMS9900	1986	TV	Cassette, cartridge, optional floppy diskette		TI-99/4A near-compatible		
USSR	Vector	Vector-06C	8080 compatible	1987	TV	Cassette, 3rd party cartridge and floppy diskette				
USA	Videobrain	VideoBrain Family Computer	Fairchild F8	1977	TV	Cartridge, optional cassette				
Hungary	Videoton	TVC	Z80	1986	TV	Cassette, floppy diskette				
Hungary	Microkey	Primo	Z80 (compatible)	1984	TV	Cassette				
Norway	West Computer AS	West PC-800	6502, Z80	1984	TV, monitor	Cassette, floppy diskette		Apple II, CP/M		
Origin	Manufacturer	Model	Processor	Year	Video Type	Mass storage	Video Chip (see list)	Compatibility	Remarks	Ref

== List of hobby, kit, or trainer computers ==
This type of microcomputer required significant electronics skills to assemble or operate. They were sometimes sold in kit form that required the user to insert and solder components in a printed circuit board. They may have had just blinking lights and toggle switches, or a hexadecimal display and a numeric keypad. While some units were possibly expandable to the "checkbook balancing/homework typing" stage, most were intended more for education on the use and application of microprocessors. See also Microprocessor development board, Single-board computer.

- Altair 8800
- Apple I and also Replica 1
- Applix 1616
- Compukit UK101
- Dick Smith Super-80 Computer
- Educ-8 non-microprocessor kit computer
- Elektor Junior Computer
- Elektor TV Games Computer
- Ferguson Big Board
- Galaksija, a build-it-yourself home computer that created a wave of enthusiasts
- Heathkit H8 and relations
- Heathkit H11
- Heath ET-100 8088 trainer
- Kenbak-1
- KIM-1
- LNW-80
- MK14
- Mark-8
- Micro-Professor MPF-I
- Nascom 1 and Nascom 2
- Newbear 77-68
- Powertran Cortex
- Processor Technology SOL 20
- PSI Comp 80 (computer)
- SCELBI
- Sinclair ZX80 kit
- Tangerine MICROTAN 65
- TEC-1
- Wave Mate Bullet
- Z 1013

== School computers ==
These were aimed at the class room, not the living room. Some types were popular in the centrally planned economies of eastern Europe where Western computers were scarce, or in the early days of computer education in Western schools. Popular home computers of the period were fitted with various types of network interfaces to allow sharing of files, large disk drives, and printers, and often allowed a teacher to interact with a student, supervise the system usage, and carry out administrative tasks from a host computer.

- Acorn Archimedes (and derivatives)
- Aster CT-80
- BBC Micro
- Commodore SuperPET/SP9000
- Compis
- IQ 151
- LINK 480Z
- Regency Systems R2C
- Research Machines 380Z Industrial and school systems
- Tiki 100
- TIM-011
- Unisys ICON

== Cardboard and demonstrator "computers" ==
Logic demonstrators illustrated some of the logical principles of computer circuits, but were incapable of automatic operation or non-trivial calculations. Some were literally cardboard, others used combinations of switches and lamps to show how logical operations worked. Some products demonstrated logical operations purely mechanically.

- CARDboard Illustrative Aid to Computation cardboard computer logic demonstrator
- Digi-Comp I, mechanical logic demonstrator
- Digi-Comp II, mechanical logic using marbles
- Geniac, non-electronic logic demonstrator
- Minivac 601, logic trainer that demonstrated computer circuits

== See also ==
- History of computer hardware in Eastern Bloc countries
- Homebrew Computer Club
- Homebuilt computer
- List of home computers by video hardware classified by video interface
- List of computers running CP/M contains a list of personal computers running CP/M. These were usually intended for small office use.
- List of Soviet computer systems includes many "home" systems as well as office and "big iron" systems.
- Market share of personal computer vendors
- Popular Electronics
- Simon (computer), a relay computer (demonstrator) from 1950
- SWTPC
- TV Typewriter
