= Poly-1 =

1980s desktop computer designed in New Zealand for educational use

- Poly-1 computer
- Developer: Neil Scott; Paul Bryant
- Manufacturer: Polycorp
- Type: Educational computer
- Released: 1981; 45 years ago
- Discontinued: 1989
- Operating system: FLEX
- CPU: Motorola 6809
- Memory: 64KB RAM
- Display: Philips 14-inch CRT, 40×24 characters, 240×204 or 480×204 pixels in 4 or 8 colors
- Graphics: Teletext SAA5050 with 8 colours
- Sound: Internal speaker
- Input: Keyboard

The Poly-1 was a desktop computer designed in New Zealand for educational use.

== Background ==
The Poly-1 was developed in 1980 by a team led by Neil Scott and Paul Bryant, who at the time were teaching electronics engineering at Wellington Polytechnic (now Massey University's Wellington campus), which the computer was named after. As with the Acorn BBC Micro in Britain, Scott and Bryant saw the increasing need for a fully integrated computer to serve the New Zealand school market, which had the blessing of then Education Minister Merv Wellington. After Scott and Bryant gathered a team of engineers and designers, DFC New Zealand Limited and Lower Hutt-based Progeni Systems — founded by Perce Harpham in 1968 — formed a joint venture, Polycorp, to market and build the Poly-1, which entered production in 1981.

A distinctive fibreglass casing was designed to house the computer and monitor as an all-in-one unit, in a similar fashion to the Commodore PET.

The Poly-1 came standard with a colour display and 64KB of RAM. A BASIC interpreter and a text editor were included, with the operating system being FLEX. The machine could display 40x24 character text (or teletext) or graphics in 240×204 or 480×204 resolution in 7 colors. There was no internal storage, but the computer could connect to a CP/M based server. The Proteus server was available as an accessory to make the Poly-1 network-capable, allowing up to 32 of the computers to be linked.

One of the earliest clients for the Poly in classroom networks was Rotorua Boys' High School, one of whose staff Derek Williams was seconded in 1984 to work as a computer programmer and software developer of educational applications for Progeni Systems Ltd on the FORGE Computer Learning System for New Zealand schools under the supervision of Emeritus Professor John Tiffin. FORGE was also used for training by the Victorian Fire Brigade in Australia, and for the first time, allowed New Zealand educators to design and deliver curricula on class computer networks.

There remains interest in the Poly with an ongoing Poly Preservation Project.

== Decline ==
Despite strong support from teachers for the Poly-1, the Muldoon Government reneged on a NZ$10,000,000 Ministry of Education agreement to purchase 1000 units over 5 years, after coming under pressure from Cabinet ministers and lobbyists who favoured economic deregulation. In particular, the then Minister of Regional Development, Warren Cooper, remarked that he and his colleagues "could see no reason why Government should spend money so that teachers could do even less work".

The Poly-1 cost up to several thousand dollars per unit, and aggressive undercutting from Apple Computer further weakened the Poly-1's place in the market. However, a sizeable consignment was still able to be sold to the Australian Defence Force and a number of local organisations.

A Poly 2 model with a separate keyboard and monitor, and Poly C designed for the Chinese market were produced, but in much smaller numbers. Plans to sell to China fell through after the Tiananmen Square protests of 1989. Additionally, by the late 1980s, the IBM PC was increasingly becoming dominant.

The Poly-1 was discontinued in 1989, and the following year Progeni was liquidated, after the collapse of DFC New Zealand Limited and the subsequent bailout of the Bank of New Zealand, to which Progeni still owed debts.

== Specifications ==
- CPU: Motorola 6809 with 6840 clock
- Networking: Motorola 6854 Proteus, max 32 interconnected

== See also ==
- Aamber Pegasus
