= Mullard SAA5050 =

Character generator chip for implementing the Teletext character set

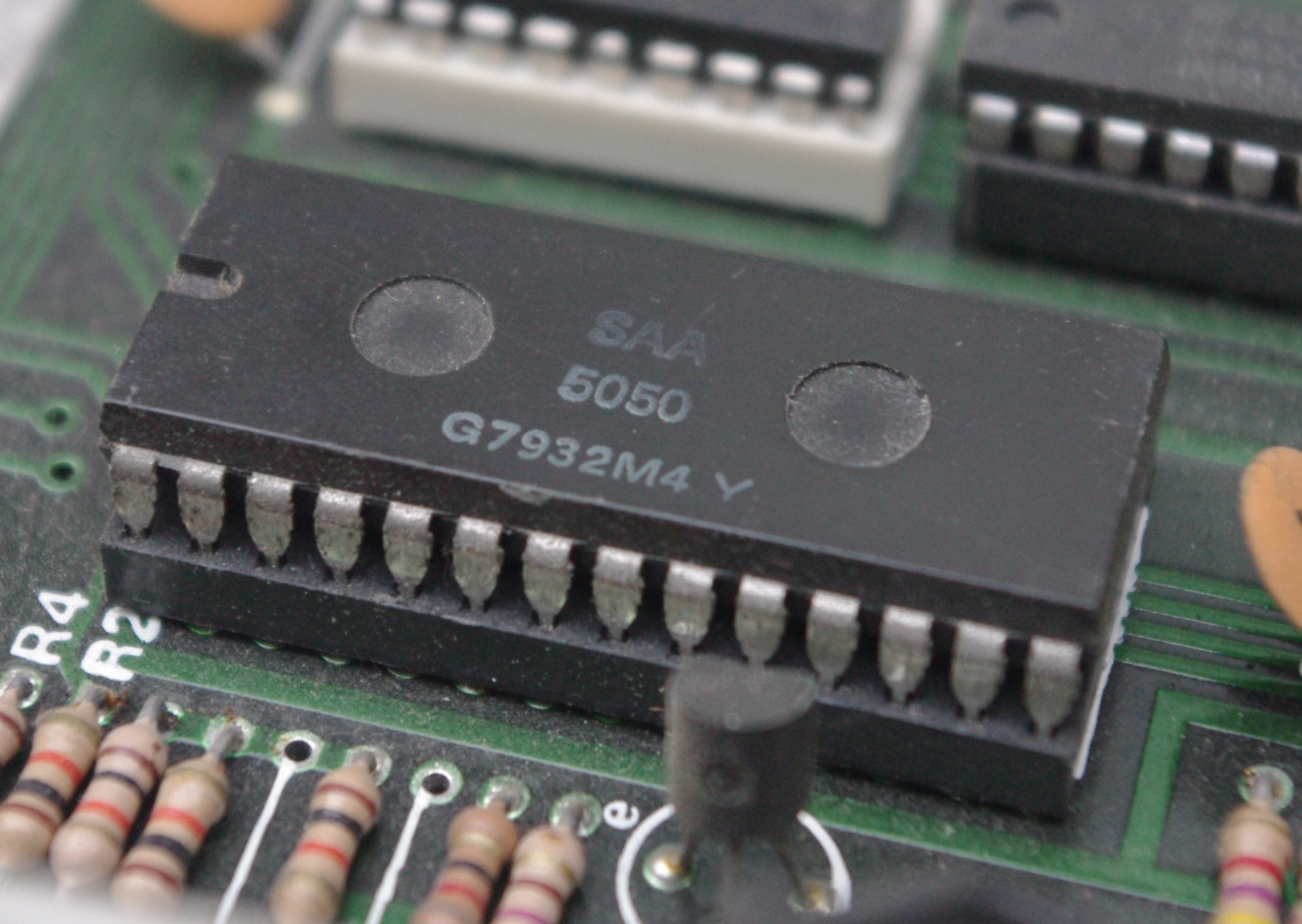
A 1979 SAA5050 in a VDU card for Acorn Eurocard systems

The Mullard SAA5050 was a character generator chip for implementing the Teletext character set.

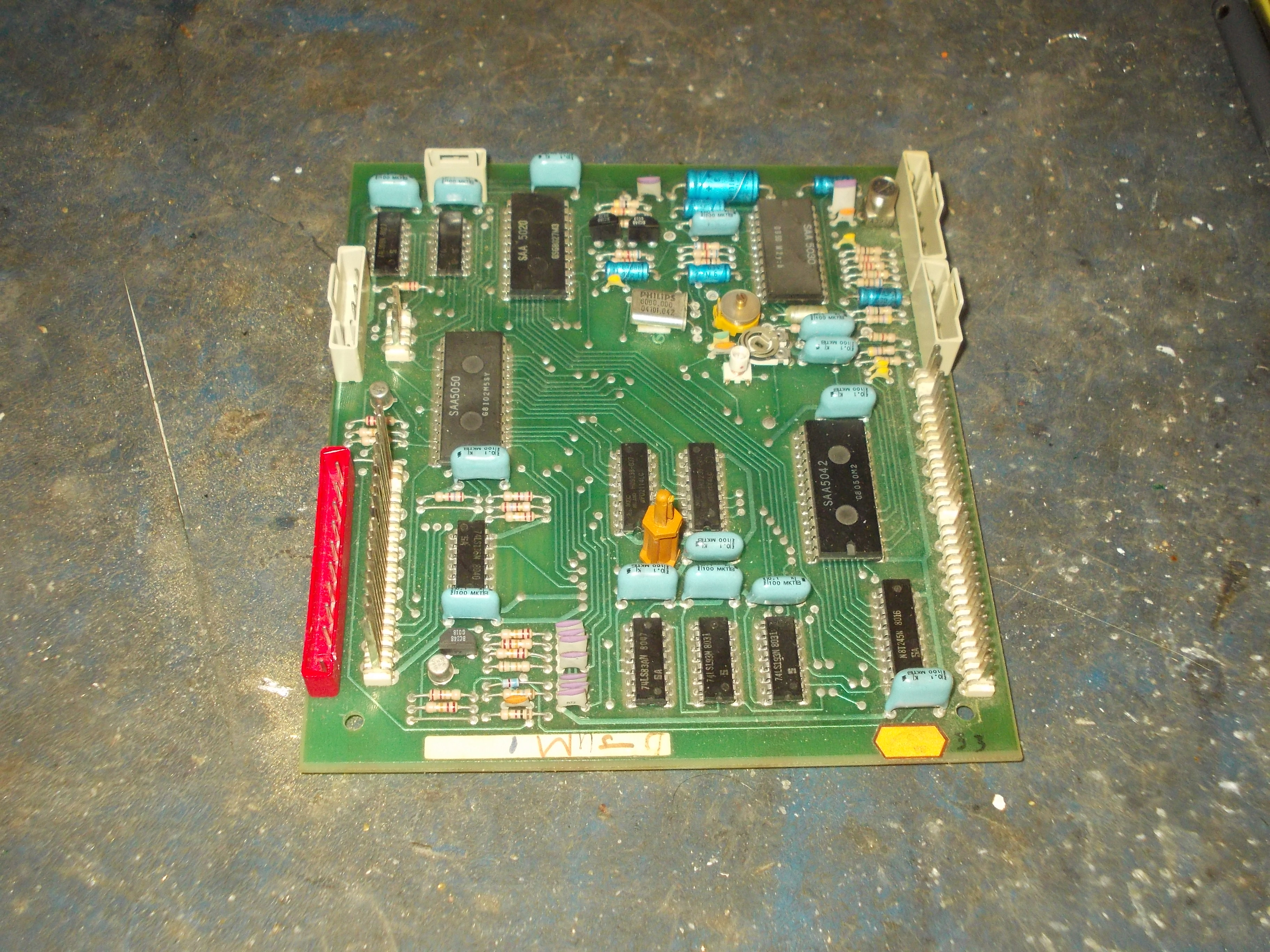
Printed circuit board used in a Philips Viewdata unit, featuring a SAA5050 character generator.

The SAA5050 was used in teletext-equipped television sets, viewdata terminals, Prestel adapters like the AlphaTantel, and microcomputers, most notably on computers like the Philips P2000 (1980), Acorn System 2 (1980), BBC Micro (1982), Malzak and Poly-1.

This chip was also manufactured by Mullard for Philips.

== Operation ==
The chip generated appropriate video output for a 7-bit input character code representing the current character on the text line, while keeping track of the effect of any of the various control characters defined by the teletext standard that had previously occurred in that text line, which could be used to change the foreground and background colour, switch to or from the alternate block graphics character set, or various other effects.

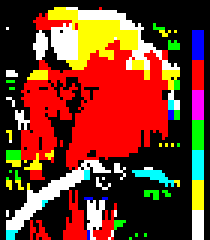
Level 1 teletext block characters and colours

Full-screen resolution generated by the SAA5050 was 480 × 500 pixels, corresponding to 40 × 25 characters. Each character position therefore corresponded to a 12 × 20 pixel space. Internally each character shape was defined on a 5 × 9 pixel grid that was loosely based on the Signetics 2513 character ROM chip. This was then interpolated by smoothing diagonals to give a 10×18 pixel character, with a characteristically angular shape, surrounded to the top and to the left by two pixels of blank space. This gave a particularly stable and flicker-free arrangement on interlaced displays.

The alternate set of 2 × 3 block graphic characters were created on the same 12 × 20 pixel grid, so that the top two blocks were each 6 × 6 pixels, the middle two blocks each 6×8 pixels, and the bottom two blocks again 6 × 6 pixels (or two fewer in each direction, if the "separated graphics" control character had been sent).

	0	1	2	3	4	5	6	7	8	9	A	B	C	D	E	F
2	NBSP	🬀	🬁	🬂	🬃	🬄	🬅	🬆	🬇	🬈	🬉	🬊	🬋	🬌	🬍	🬎
3	🬏	🬐	🬑	🬒	🬓	▌	🬔	🬕	🬖	🬗	🬘	🬙	🬚	🬛	🬜	🬝
6	🬞	🬟	🬠	🬡	🬢	🬣	🬤	🬥	🬦	🬧	▐	🬨	🬩	🬪	🬫	🬬
7	🬭	🬮	🬯	🬰	🬱	🬲	🬳	🬴	🬵	🬶	🬷	🬸	🬹	🬺	🬻	█

The pixels were usually displayed with a 1.33:1 or 1.2:1 aspect ratio to give a full display close to the standard 4:3 TV aspect ratio, effectively a 400 × 300 or 480 × 400 display.

== Versions ==
Compared to other alternative chips, the SAA5050 implemented the original World System Teletext teletext standard (Level 1), which had no provision to set black for the foreground text colour. Some alternative chips at the time did allow this, as became formalized in the 1981 CEPT videotex standard.

In addition to the UK version, several variants of the chip existed with slightly different character sets for particular localizations and/or languages. These had part numbers SAA5051 (German), SAA5052 (Swedish), SAA5053 (Italian), SAA5054 (Belgian), SAA5055 (U.S. ASCII), SAA5056 (Hebrew) and SAA5057 (Cyrillic).

The SAA5050 was later superseded by the SAA5243 CCT chip, integrating a similar teletext character generator with all previously separately implemented functions such as decoding, timing and video generation. It was controlled through I^{2}C.

== See also ==
- Teletext character set
- Viewdata
- Character generator
- AlphaTantel
- Philips P2000
- Acorn System 2
- BBC Micro
- Poly-1
