= Colour Genie =

Computer from the 1980s

EACA EG2000 Colour Genie
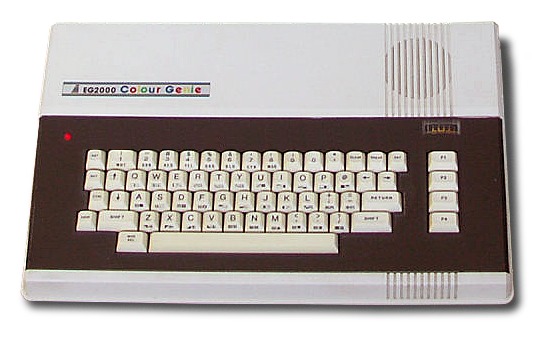
- EG2000 Colour Genie computer
- Manufacturer: EACA
- Released: August 1982; 43 years ago
- Introductory price: £200 (equivalent to £713 in 2025)
- Discontinued: 1983
- Operating system: 16 KB ROM containing LEVEL II BASIC
- CPU: Zilog Z80, 2 MHz
- Memory: 16 KB RAM, expandable to 32 KB
- Display: PAL composite or RF out; 40×24 text, 16 colours; 160×96 graphics, 4 colours
- Graphics: Motorola 6845
- Sound: AY-3-8910
- Input: 63-key typewriter style Keyboard with 4 programmable function keys
- Power: 5V DC, +12V DC and -12V DC
- Predecessor: Video Genie

The EACA EG2000 Colour Genie was a computer produced by Hong Kong–based manufacturer EACA, and introduced in Germany in August 1982 by Trommeschläger Computer Service and Schmidtke Electronic.

It followed their earlier Video Genie I and II computers and was released around the same time as the business-oriented Video Genie.

The LEVEL II BASIC was compatible with the Video Genie I and II and the TRS-80, except for graphic and sound commands; most of the routines for Video Genie I BASIC commands were left over in the Colour Genie's BASIC ROM. Programs were provided to load TRS-80 programs into the Colour Genie. Colour Genie disks could be read in a TRS-80 floppy disk drive and vice versa, editing the pdrive commands.

The original Video Genies had been based upon (and broadly compatible with) the then-current TRS-80 Model I. As the Colour Genie was descended from this architecture, it was incompatible with Tandy's newer TRS-80 Color Computer which – despite its name – was an entirely new and unrelated design based on an entirely different CPU, and thus incompatible with the TRS-80 Model I and derivatives such as the Color Genie.

About 190 games were published for the system in English and German.

An 80 column card was produced.

Modern emulators for this system exist.

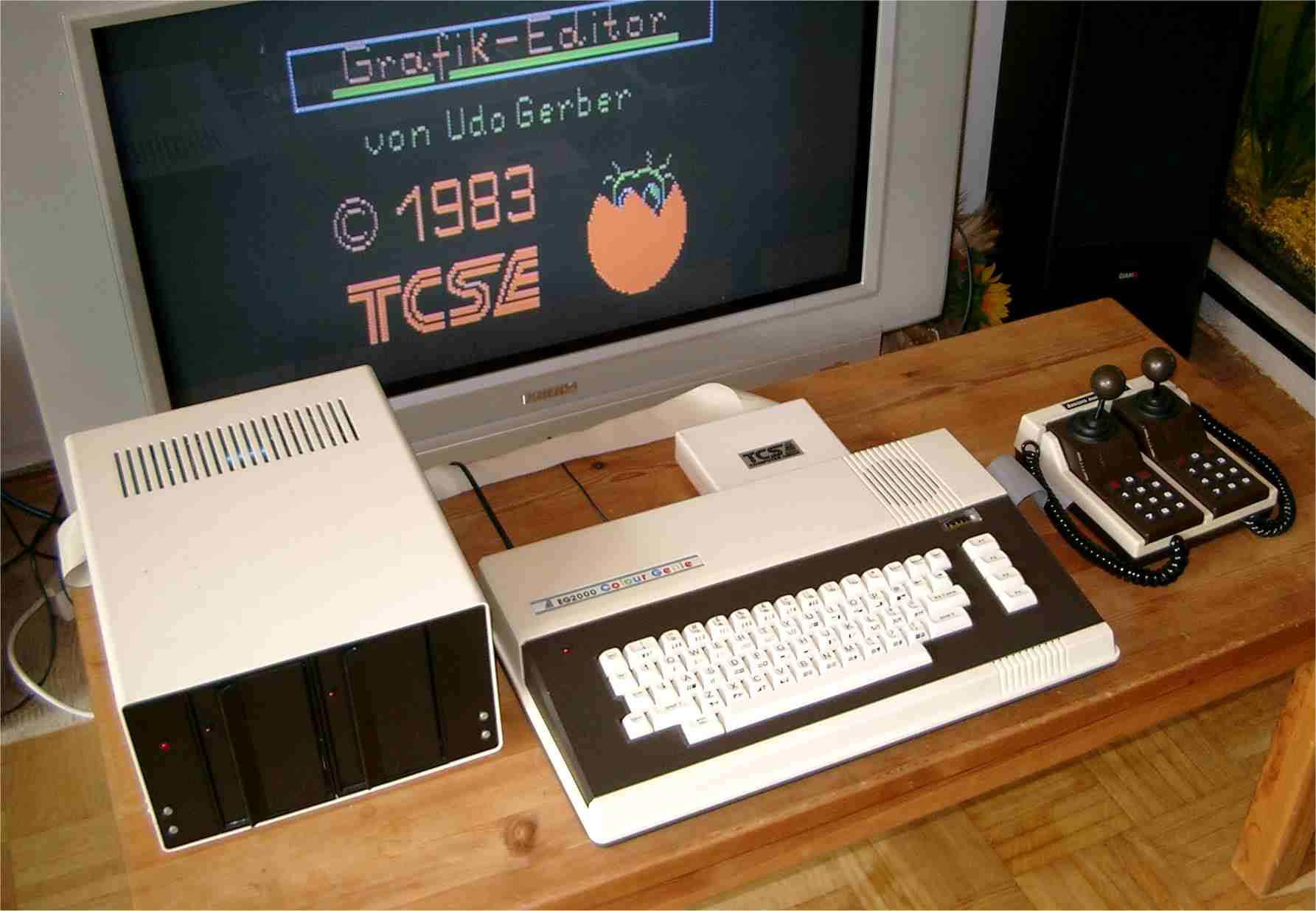
A Colour Genie computer

== Technical specifications ==
=== Central Processing Unit ===
Z80 running at 2.2 MHz. Usually using the NEC D780 (an unlicenced Japanese clone) or the SGS Z80 (a European second source for Zilog).

=== Internal hardware ===
- Video Hardware
  - Motorola 6845 CRTC
  - 40 × 24 text (original ROMs) or 40 × 25 text (upgraded ROMs), 16 colours, 128 user defined characters
  - 160 × 96 graphics (original ROMs) or 160 × 102 graphics (upgraded ROMs), 4 colours x up to 4 pages
- Sound Hardware
  - General Instruments AY-3-8910
  - 3 sound channels, ADSR programmable
  - 1 noise generator, usable on each of 3 sound channels
  - 2 8-bit wide I/O ports

=== I/O ports and power supply ===
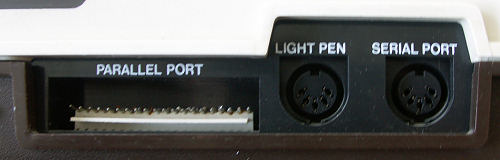
EACA EG2000 Colour Genie ports

- I/O ports:
  - Composite video out and audio out (cinch plugs)
  - Integrated RF modulator antenna output, which also carries sound, to TV
  - Cartridge expansion slot (slot for edge connector with Z80 CPU address/data bus lines and control signals, as well as GND and voltage pins; used for ROM cartridges or the floppy disk controller
  - 1200 baud tape interface (5 pin DIN)
  - RS-232 port (5 pin DIN)
  - Light pen port (5 pin DIN)
  - Parallel port for printer or joystick controller

=== External hardware options ===
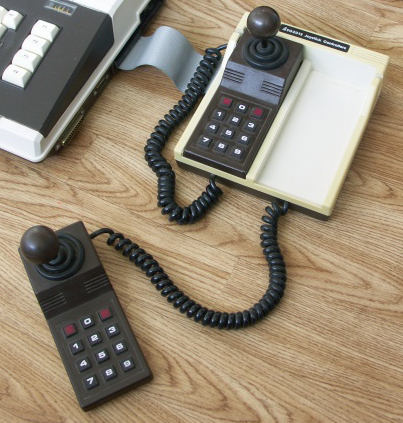

- Floppy disk controller with floppy disk station.
  - Supported up to 4 drives (5.25 inch).
  - Support for 90 KB SS/SD up to 720 KB DS/DD drives.
- Cassette recorder
- EPROM cartridge of 12 KB
- EG2013 Joystick Controller
  - 2 Analogue joysticks with keypad

== Games ==
There are 144 (Note: This number is always up to date by this script.) games on this list.

| Name | Year | Publisher |
|---|---|---|
| 3D Haunted House | 1983 | Ipswich Software Factory |
| A10 Bomber | 1983 | Ipswich Software Factory |
| Air Raid | 1983 | Kwerty Software |
| Airaid | 198? | Kwerty Software |
| Aliens | 198? | Kwerty Software |
| Andromeda | 1982 | TCG |
| Andromeda 16k ver. | 1982 | TCS Trommeschläger Computer Studio |
| Andromeda 32k ver. | 1982 | TCS Trommeschläger Computer Studio |
| Astronaut | 1984 | TCS Trommeschläger Computer Studio |
| Backgammon | 1983 | JD Tronics |
| Bak-Pak | 1984 | Arcade Games |
| Bang Bang | 1983 | Gumboot Software |
| Blitz | 1983 | MCE |
| Blastaroids | 1983 | Algray Software |
| Botschaft | 1985 | SBS Scholz Baeumner Schaffarzik |
| Bumm Bumm | 198? | TCS Trommeschläger Computer Studio |
| BängBäng - 2 player Gun fight | 1983 | TCS Trommeschläger Computer Studio |
| CIA-Agent | 1985 | SBS Scholz Baeumner Schaffarzik |
| Chess Machine | 1984 | Hubben Software Verlag |
| Chomper | 198? | Kansas Software |
| Chopper | 198? | TCS Trommeschläger Computer Studio |
| Colour Frog | 1983 | TCS Trommeschläger Computer Studio |
| Colour Genie Chess | 1984 | Gumboot Software |
| Colour Genie Flugsimulator | 1984 | TCS Trommeschläger Computer Studio |
| Colour Genie Golf | 1983 | Gumboot Software |
| Colour Genie Poker | | Gumboot Software |
| Colour Kong 16k ver. | 1983 | TCS Trommeschläger Computer Studio |
| Colour Kong 32k ver. | 1983 | TCS Trommeschläger Computer Studio |
| Colour Quest 1: Find the Diamond of Balmarlon | 1983 | Gumboot Software |
| Colour Quest 2: The Vegan Incident | 1983 | Gumboot Software |
| Colour Quest 3: Enchanted Gardens | 1983 | Gumboot Software |
| Colour Quest 4: Camelot Adventure | 1983 | Gumboot Software |
| Colour Quest 5: Shipwreck | 1983 | Gumboot Software |
| Colour Quest 6: Fishing Quest | 1983 | Gumboot Software |
| Colour Schach | 1983 | TCS Trommeschläger Computer Studio |
| Cosmic Attack | 198? | Kansas Software |
| Death Cells | 1983 | Kwerty Software |
| Deathstar | 1983 | Algray Software |
| Defender | 198? | Goldau Softwareproduction, Andreas |
| Dig Boy | 1983 | TCS Trommeschläger Computer Studio |
| Die Juwelen des Grafen Dracula | 198? | Cooperated Software |
| Disastrous Villa | 1985 | SBS Scholz Baeumner Schaffarzik |
| Droids | | Arcade Games |
| Double Agent | 1983 | Algray Software |
| Eagle | 1983 | TCS Trommeschläger Computer Studio |
| Eatman | 1983 | Molimerx, Ltd. |
| Eis | 1983 | TCS Trommeschläger Computer Studio |
| Eliminator | 1984 | TCC |
| Enchanted Gardens | 1983 | Gumboot Software |
| ExReversic | 1983 | TCS Trommeschläger Computer Studio |
| Exterminator II - The Mad Menagerie | 1984 | Algray Software |
| Exterminator Part 1: The Birds | | Algray Software |
| Fast Food | 1983 | CC Computer Studio |
| Firebird | 1983 | Hubben Software Verlag |
| Flying Bytes | 1984 | Arcade Games |
| Fortress Of Evil | | Algray Software |
| Galactic Attack | 1983 | Microbyte Software |
| Genie Trek | | Gumboot Software |
| Geniepede | 1983 | Ipswich Software Factory |
| Genmon | | Algray Software |
| Gobble Garden | 198? | Kwerty Software |
| Gobbledygook | | Gumboot Software |
| Gorilla | 1983 | Hubben Software Verlag |
| Grand Prix | 1985 | Gumboot Software |
| Grabit | | Kwerty Software |
| Hamlet | | JD Tronics |
| Hangman | | Kwerty Software |
| Haunted House | | Gumboot Software |
| Hektik | 1984 | Arcade Games |
| Helikopter | 1983 | Hubben Software Verlag |
| Horror Castle | 198? | SBS Scholz Baeumner Schaffarzik |
| House of Death | 1985 | SBS Scholz Baeumner Schaffarzik |
| Im Reich der Fraggels | 198? | SBS Scholz Baeumner Schaffarzik |
| Invaders from Space | 1983 | Molimerx, Ltd. |
| Invasion aus dem Weltraum | 1982 | TCS Trommeschläger Computer Studio |
| Jet Set Billy | 1984 | Arcade Games |
| Joker Poker | 1983 | TCS Trommeschläger Computer Studio |
| Jumbo | 1984 | Gumboot Software |
| King | 1983 | TCS Trommeschläger Computer Studio |
| Kniffel | 1985 | TTS |
| Kong | 1983 | Algray Software |
| Labyrinth of Fear | 1983 | Algray Software |
| Länder-Quiz | 1984 | TCS Trommeschläger Computer Studio |
| Life | 1983 | TCS Trommeschläger Computer Studio |
| Lunar Lander | 1983 | TCS Trommeschläger Computer Studio |
| Mad Menagerie | | Algray Software |
| Madtree | 1983 | TCS Trommeschläger Computer Studio |
| Maestro | | Algray Software |
| Mampf Man II | 1983 | TCS Trommeschläger Computer Studio |
| Martian Rescue | 1983 | Ipswich Software Factory |
| Maze Chaser | 198? | Superb Software |
| Maze Chaser | 198? | Superb Software |
| Micronopoly | 1983 | JD Tronics |
| Millipede | 1984 | Gonzalo |
| Mord im Zeppelin | 198? | SBS Scholz Baeumner Schaffarzik |
| Motten | 1982 | TCS Trommeschläger Computer Studio |
| Mysterious Adventures #1: The Golden Baton | 1982 | Molimerx, Ltd. |
| Mysterious Adventures #2: The Time Machine | 1982 | Molimerx, Ltd. |
| Mysterious Adventures #3: Arrow of Death Pt.1 | 1982 | Molimerx, Ltd. |
| Mysterious Adventures #6: Circus | 1982 | Molimerx, Ltd. |
| Mysterious Tavern | 198? | SBS Scholz Baeumner Schaffarzik |
| Netzo | 1983 | TCS Trommeschläger Computer Studio |
| Orgel | 1982 | TCS Trommeschläger Computer Studio |
| Othello | | JD Tronics |
| Pac Boy | 1984 | Hubben Software Verlag |
| Palace of Ming | 1984 | Cooperated Software |
| Panik | 1982 | TCS Trommeschläger Computer Studio |
| Peng | 198? | TCS Trommeschläger Computer Studio |
| Plato | 198? | Gumboot Software |
| Puckman | 1983 | JD Tronics |
| Punter | 1984 | Gumboot Software |
| Q*Man | 1984 | Arcade Games |
| Quandry | 1984 | Omega Software |
| Quasimodo | 1984 | Kingsoft GmbH Germany |
| Racing | 1984 | Gumboot Software |
| Racing Driver | 1982 | Molimerx, Ltd. |
| Rockfall | | MCE |
| Saug | 1983 | TCS Trommeschläger Computer Studio |
| Schiff des Grauens | 198? | SBS Scholz Baeumner Schaffarzik |
| Skramble | 1983 | Algray Software |
| Space Attack | 1984 | TCC |
| Space Fighter | 1984 | Molimerx, Ltd. |
| Spell A Picture 1+2 | 1983 | Gumboot Software |
| Super-Basic | 198? | Hubben Software Verlag |
| Swag! | 1985 | Arcade Games |
| Tank Race Intercept | | Kwerty Software |
| Tausendfuss | 1983 | TCS Trommeschläger Computer Studio |
| Ten Little Indians | 1984 | Molimerx, Ltd. |
| Terry's Travels | 1983 | Gumboot Software |
| The Compiler | | Gumboot Software |
| The Graphics Master | | Algray Software |
| The Input Module | | Gumboot Software |
| The Word | | JD Tronics |
| Toad Mania | 1983 | Gumboot Software |
| To Hell And Back | 1986 | Battle-Soft |
| Trash-Man | 1983 | Schmidtke Electronic |
| Triton Battle | 198? | Schmidtke Electronic |
| Uttpac | | Algray Software |
| Vortex | 1984 | Hubben Software Verlag |
| Windscale | 1983 | MCE |
| Wolftracks | | Gumboot Software |
| Wordy | 198? | Gumboot Software |
| What's My Rhyme? | 1984 | Gumboot Software |
| Zeichensätze | 1983 | TCS Trommeschläger Computer Studio |
