= CCE MC-1000 =

Brazilian home computer

MC-1000 Color Computer
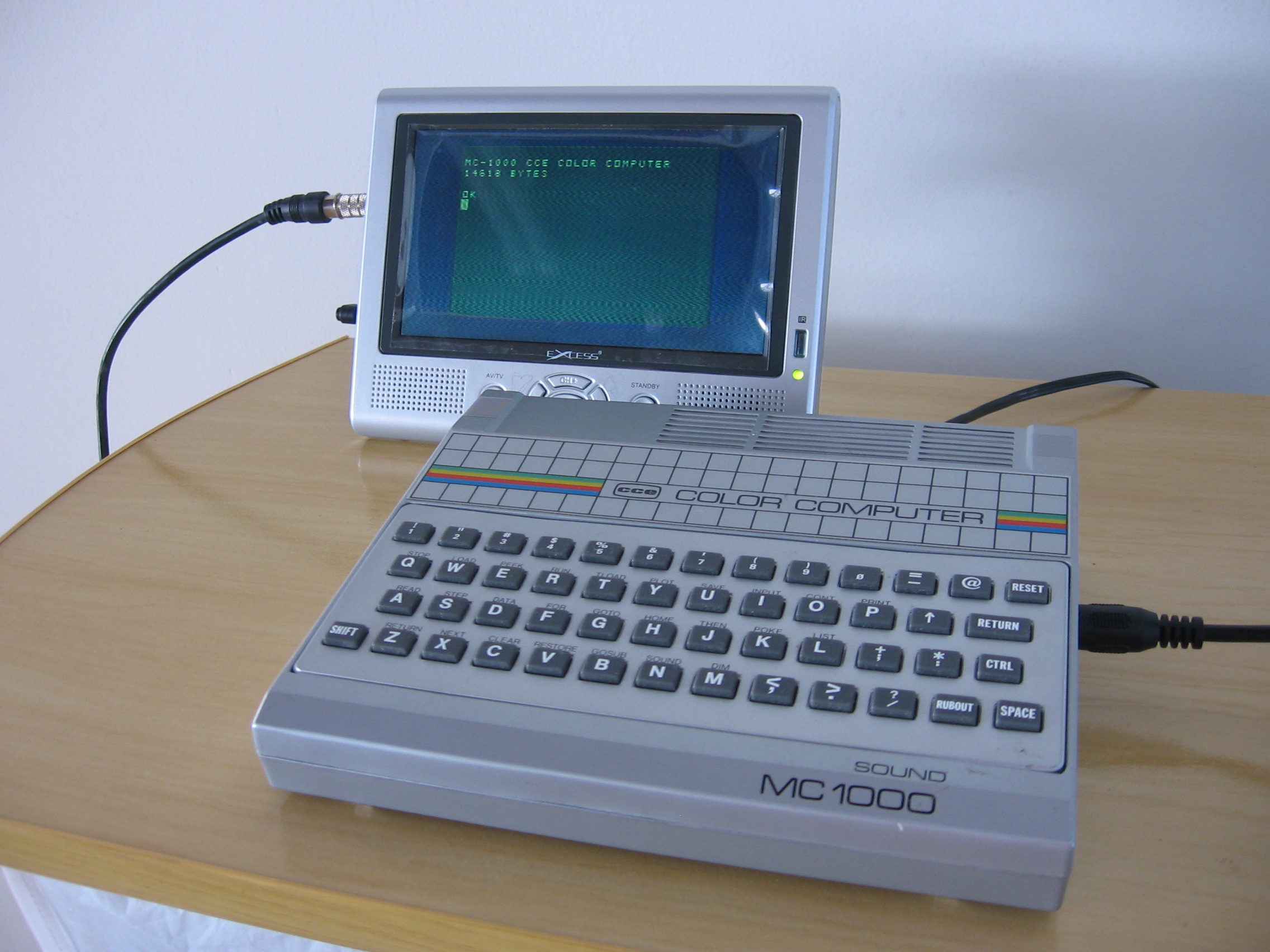
- Manufacturer: CCE (Indústria e Comércio de Componentes Eletrônicos)
- Type: Home computer
- Released: 1985
- Introductory price: Cr$ 1.1 million
- Discontinued: 1986
- Media: Cassette tape
- Operating system: BASIC
- CPU: Zilog Z80A @ 3.57 MHz
- Memory: 16 KB RAM (expandable to 64 KB)
- Display: 32×16 text in 8 colors; 128×64, 128×96, 128×192, 256×192 graphics with 2 background and 3 foreground colors
- Graphics: MC6847
- Sound: AY-3-8910
- Input: Keyboard

The MC-1000 Color Computer was a home computer produced in Brazil by CCE (Indústria e Comércio de Componentes Eletrônicos) and released in February 1985.

The machine shares some hardware heritage with the GEM 1000/Charlemagne 999 and the Rabbit RX83. Like the ZX Spectrum, BASIC commands were typed by pressing a single key.

It was not popular due to outdated technical specifications and lack of compatibility with established 8-bit systems of the time.

== History ==
The GEM 1000 Junior Computer, also known as Charlemagne 999 in Belgium and sold by Vidéo Direct International (VDI), was a low cost toy home computer for children from 5 years upwards, produced by Taiwan based Gem International Corporation and introduced in 1983. It was part of a family consisting of the GEM-2000 Family Mini-Computer, GEM-3000 Family Super Computer and the GEM-4000 Professional Computer.

The GEM 1000 had 16 KB of RAM. BASIC commands were typed by pressing a single key using a dialect similar to Applesoft BASIC. The Charlemagne 999 used French instead of English keywords.

The Rabbit RX83, produced by Rabbit Computers of Hong Kong had 2 KB of RAM, limiting the display to 32×16 characters in 8 colors or 128×64 graphics with 2 background and 3 foreground colors. It was launched at the 1983 edition of the Consumer Electronics Show with a price of just US$99.

The MC-1000 Color Computer was similar to these machines but released years later in 1985, when the Brazilian market was already saturated with cheap machines offering similar features. As such, it did not attract much attention even though it was touted as a "Brazilian computer".

The fact that it was not a clone of popular 8-bit systems (like the Apple, TRS-80 or the Sinclair Spectrum) did not contribute to its popularity. In addition to poor design and having a chiclet keyboard, the MC-1000 had only 16 KB of RAM which was small by the standards of the time.

The machine was commercialized up to 1986.

== Technical specifications ==
- CPU: Zilog Z80A, 3.57 MHz
- Memory: 16 KB RAM expandable to 64 KB; 8 KB ROM; up-to 6 KB VRAM
- Keyboard: 50-key rubber Chiclet keyboard
- Display: Motorola MC6847 (32×16 text in 8 colors; 128×64, 128×96, 128×192, 256×192 graphics with 2 background and 3 foreground colors)
- Sound: AY-3-8910 (3 voices and white noise)
- Ports: cassette recorder interface (1200 bit/s), TV output connector, joystick

== Emulation ==
Like similar early home computers, the MC-1000 Color Computer can be emulated on modern machines.

== Video games ==
10 games are known to exist for CCE MC-1000, all released in Brazil.

- Aventura
- Batalha Aeronaval
- Batalha de Matemática
- Guerra de Robos
- Invasores do Espaço
- Jipe de Guerra
- Jogo da Forca I
- Jogo da Forca II
- Jogo de Memória
- Othello
