= Philips P2000 =

Early home computer

P2000
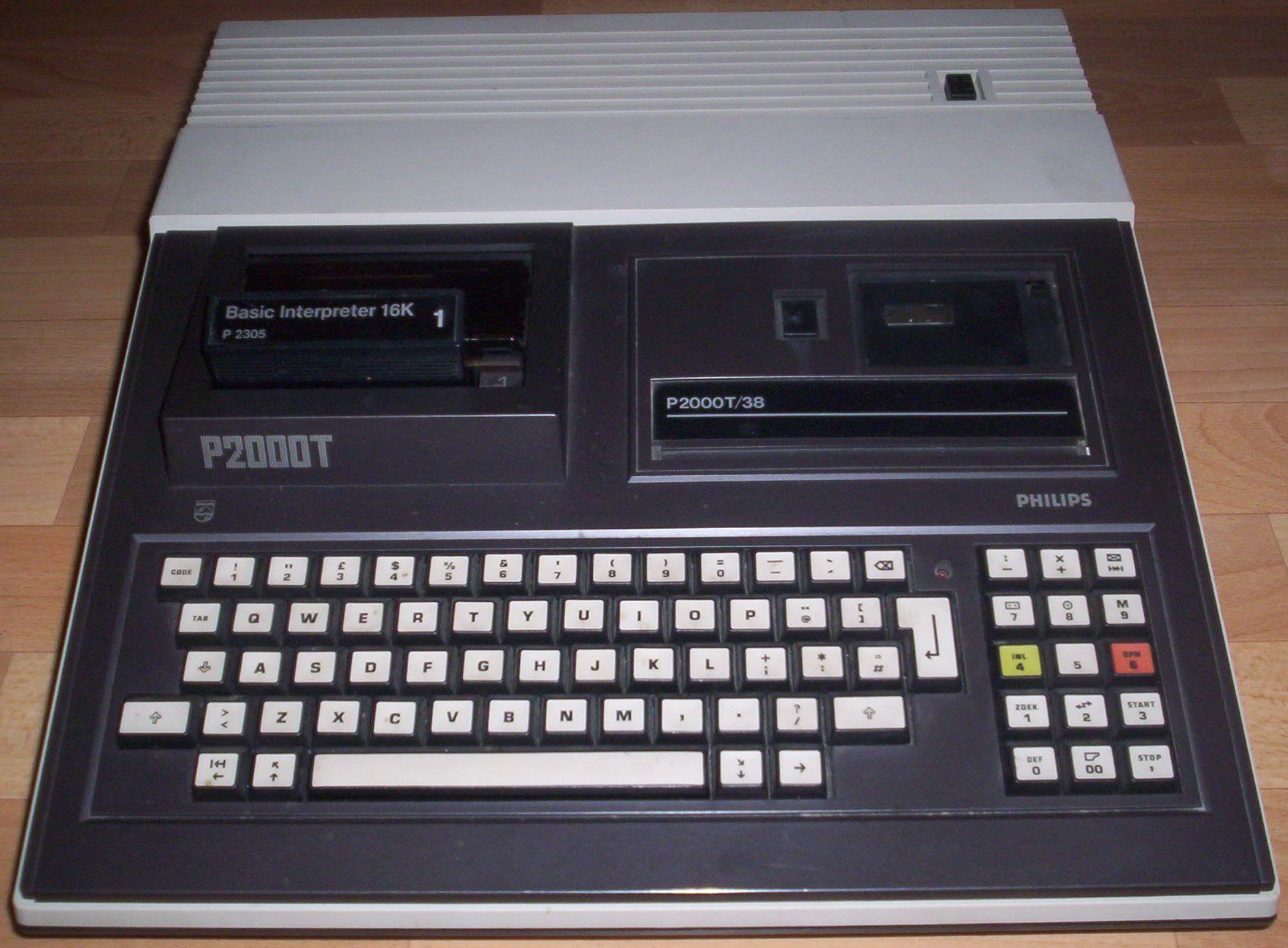
- Philips P2000T
- Manufacturer: Philips Austria
- Type: Home computer
- Released: March 1980
- Introductory price: 3000 guilders (equivalent to 2725 EUR in 2015)
- Operating system: 4 KB ROM containing BASIC and JWSDOS, CP/M with extra card + 12 KB Cartridge
- CPU: Zilog Z80 @ 2.5 MHz
- Memory: 16 KB RAM, expandable to 48 KB
- Display: Text mode 40 × 25, 7 Colors
- Graphics: Mullard SAA5050 Teletext chip
- Sound: Beeper, 1 channel
- Connectivity: 2 cartridge slots T version: TV aerial, RGB, Serial; M version: Monochrome composite video, FDD interface, Serial

The Philips P2000T home computer was Philips' first real entry in the home computer market in 1980, after the Philips Videopac G7000 game system (better known in North America as the Magnavox Odyssey2) which they already sold to compete with the Atari 2600 and similar game systems.

The P20 series had other models like the P2000M and P2000C, described below.

The P20 systems can be emulated with the MESS software, and since 2015 they are part of MAME. Other emulators also exist.

== P2000T ==
The P2000T was a Z80-based home computer that used a Mullard SAA5050 teletext display chip to produce the video picture and a small Mini-Cassette recorder for 42 kilobytes of mass storage capacity. The Mini-Cassette was treated as a floppy drive from the user's perspective, using the automatic search for a program (CLOAD command) or free space (CSAVE). A command to display the directory of the cassette was also implemented.

Philips used components they already produced for other markets (television sets and dictation machines) to quickly design a small computer system. It was partially designed by professor Dieter Hammer. Philips used the ROM cartridge system from their Videopac G7000 game system. One of these cartridges contained Microsoft BASIC.

Although the teletext video chip permitted a quick entry into the home computer market, it was a major weakness of the P2000T. Using the teletext standard allowed it to support eight colors and rudimentary semigraphics, but unlike later entries in the home computer market which also supported a teletext display (such as the BBC Micro and Oric Atmos), the P2000T did not also have a high resolution mode. Consequently few games were developed for the P2000T.

As a result, the P2000T had only limited success, and Philips later replaced it with their MSX machines. The machine did gain popularity in Netherlands, especially in the areas of science, education, and data communications (videotex).

Initially, in 1981, the computer cost 3000 guilders (€2725 in 2015's money). In 1984 the price was lowered to 1200 guilders (€967 in 2015's money).

== P2000M ==
The P2000M version came with an additional 80-column 512 x 256 graphic mode card. It shipped with built-in monochrome monitor cabinet also housing a dual 5¼-inch floppy disk drive. It could run CP/M or Microsoft BASIC applications, depending on the cartridge used. It was incompatible with the P2000T due to the way it handled display of special characters (color, "graphics mode"), which made most P2000T games unplayable.

== P2000C ==
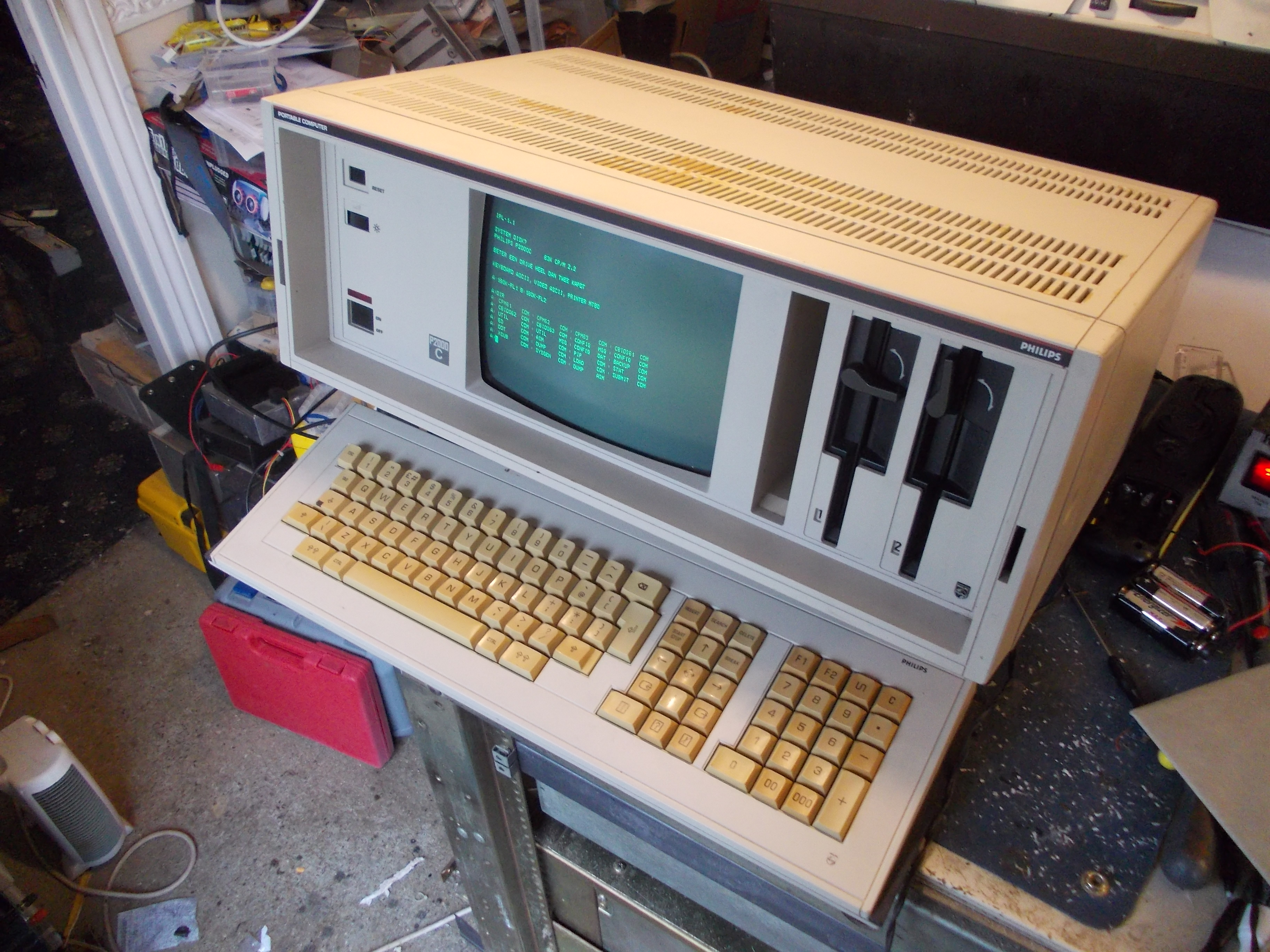
Philips P2000C

The P2000C version, introduced in 1982, was portable, and could run CP/M in 80-column {{512 x 256 graphic mode at 4 MHz CPU speed.
