= Ei Niš =

Serbian company

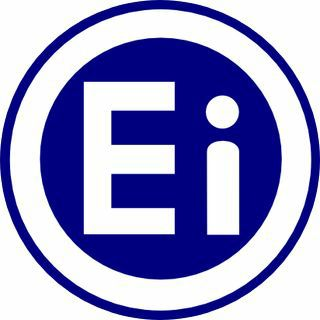
- Official logo

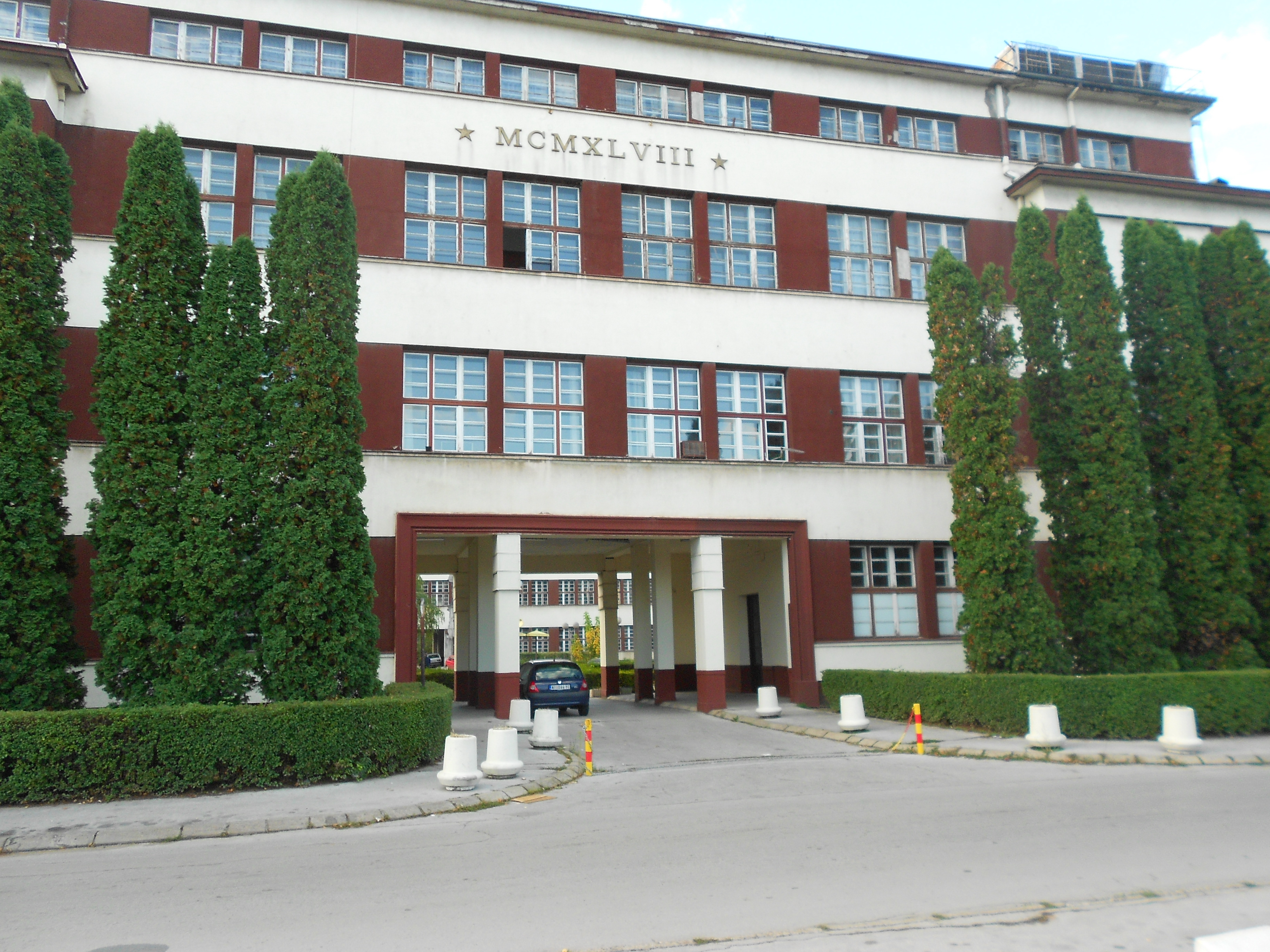
- Headquarters building in Niš
- Type: Joint-stock company
- Industry: Electronics
- Founded: 21 June 1991; 35 years ago (Current form); First founded in 1948
- Fate: Bankruptcy procedure
- Headquarters: Bulevar Svetog cara Konstantina Rd 80-86, Niš, Serbia
- Key people: Predrag Kosovac (Trustee)
- Products: Röntgen machines, acoustic equipment, electronic machine elements
- Number of employees: 1 (2016)
- Website: www.eicorp.rs

Ei Niš (full legal name: Holding-Korporacija Elektronska industrija a.d. Niš) or Electronics Industry Niš, is a holding company with headquarters in Niš, Serbia. The company has operated from 1948 until it declared bankruptcy in 2016.

== History ==
It originated in 1948 from the foundation of the Institute for the Production of Radio Sets and X-ray Machines, "RR Niš." In the 1970s and 1980s it was one of the greatest Yugoslavian companies employing over 10 thousand people. However, during the 1990s most of the company business collapsed, due to the war in Yugoslavia, lack of investing in research and sanctions the country was facing.

During the 2000s, the company manufactured acoustic equipment, electronic tubes including cathode-ray tubes, printed plates, electronic machine elements, hydraulics, pneumatics, appliances, air-conditioners, medical equipment, roentgen machines, TV sets, radio receivers, and semiconductors. It was one of the few remaining makers of electronic vacuum tubes.

In 2016, after decades of insolvency, it declared bankruptcy before regional Business Court.

Elektronska Industrija Niš works in partnership with other European companies, such as Alcatel (telephony), Honeywell, Bull, Silicon graphics (computers), Sagem, Siemens, Hellige, or even ITT or Philips.

== Operations ==
The most successful period of business was from 1965 to 1980. At that time, EI had plants in Nis, Belgrade, Svrljig, Žitoraža, Aleksinac, Đevđelia (Macedonia), Serbia (Croatia), about 50 factories with 28,000 workers and an annual gross product of about 700 million dollars. At that time, the electronic industry had a large range of consumer products for domestic needs, the military and export. Appliances and devices were produced in large series: radios, loudspeakers, amplifiers, sound systems, computers, electric meters, washing machines, dishwashers, ordinary irons, televisions, telephones, telephone exchanges, HF devices, radio stations, railway signaling, traffic lights and accompanying equipment, special purpose devices for the needs of the army and militia, printed electronic circuits, industrial electronics, auto electronics, X-ray devices, medical devices, color cathode ray tubes, electronic tubes, air conditioners, cardboard packaging, plastic goods, ferromagnetic materials, resistors, capacitors, mechanical parts of devices, semiconductor elements.

Ei had spread plants into all Yugoslav republics and managed to develop full production process, most of all, semiconductor production.

The subsidiaries that have operated within the holding company Ei under various names and in various organizational forms are:

- EI Acoustics Svrjig
- EI Machine Shop Nis
- EI Household Appliances Nis
- EI Auto Service Nis
- EI Beokom Belgrade
- EI VEP Nis (or EI Vakum Electronic Products Nis)
- EI VF Zemun (later privatized to "VF Holding" AD)
- EI Ekos Eds Nis
- EI Ekos Nis
- EI Exim Belgrade
- EI Expocom Belgrade
- EI Elbas Zemun
- EI Electromedicine Nis
- EI Electrical Products Nis
- EI Elkom Zemun (or EI Avala Zemun)
- EI Elmag Nis
- EI Energy and Maintenance Zemun
- EI Eurostand Nis
- EI Protection Nis
- EI Industrial Electronics Nis
- EI Informatics Nis ("Technicom Informatics" Nis)
- EI Irin Nis
- EI Research and Development Institute Belgrade (now IRITEL)
- EI Jugorendgen (or EI X-ray Machine Factory)
- EI Ceramics Djevđelija
- EI Color Cathode Tubes Nis
- EI Commerce Nis
- EI Components Nis
- EI Measuring Devices Nis
- EI Metal Nis
- EI Nikola Tesla Zemun
- EI Nit Nis
- EI Opek Nis
- EI Pack Aleksinac
- EI Pionir Zemun
- EI Plastics Nis
- EI Semiconductors Nis
- EI Trade Nis
- EI Professional Electronics Nis
- EI Pupin Zemun
- EI Radio Tubes Nis
- EI Computers Nis
- EI Components Nis
- EI October 7 Nis
- EI Service Network Belgrade
- EI Sigraph Nis
- EI Owl Nis (after privatization by HDS Nis)
- EI Standard (or EI UIT Nis)
- EI Television Nis
- EI Test Nis
- EI Transport and Trade Nis
- EI Service Nis
- EI Factory of Electric Hand Tools Zemun
- EI Machinery and Equipment Factory Nis EI Machine Parts Factory Nis
- EI Radio Receiver Factory Nis (or EI Radio Acoustics)
- EI Signal Devices Factory Belgrade
- EI Specific Elements Factory Nis
- EI Femid Bela Palanka
- EI Ferit Zemun
- EI Hanivel Nis
- EI Chegar Nis
- EI SKO Nis or EI Internal Bank Nis
- EI Printed Circuits Nis

== Sponsorships ==
Ei agreed with local club FK Radnički Niš on sponsorship deal during 80s. The club peaked in the early 80s when it reached the UEFA Cup semifinals after already being near very top in the Yugoslav league for few year.

== Products ==
Ei managed to develop full spectrum of electronics production, but it was mostly know in the market by loudspeakers, amplifiers, sound systems, computers, electric meters, washing machines, dishwashers, ordinary irons, televisions, telephones, telephone exchanges.

EI products included the computers Pecom 32, Pecom 64, as well as the Lira series, starting with the Lira 512.

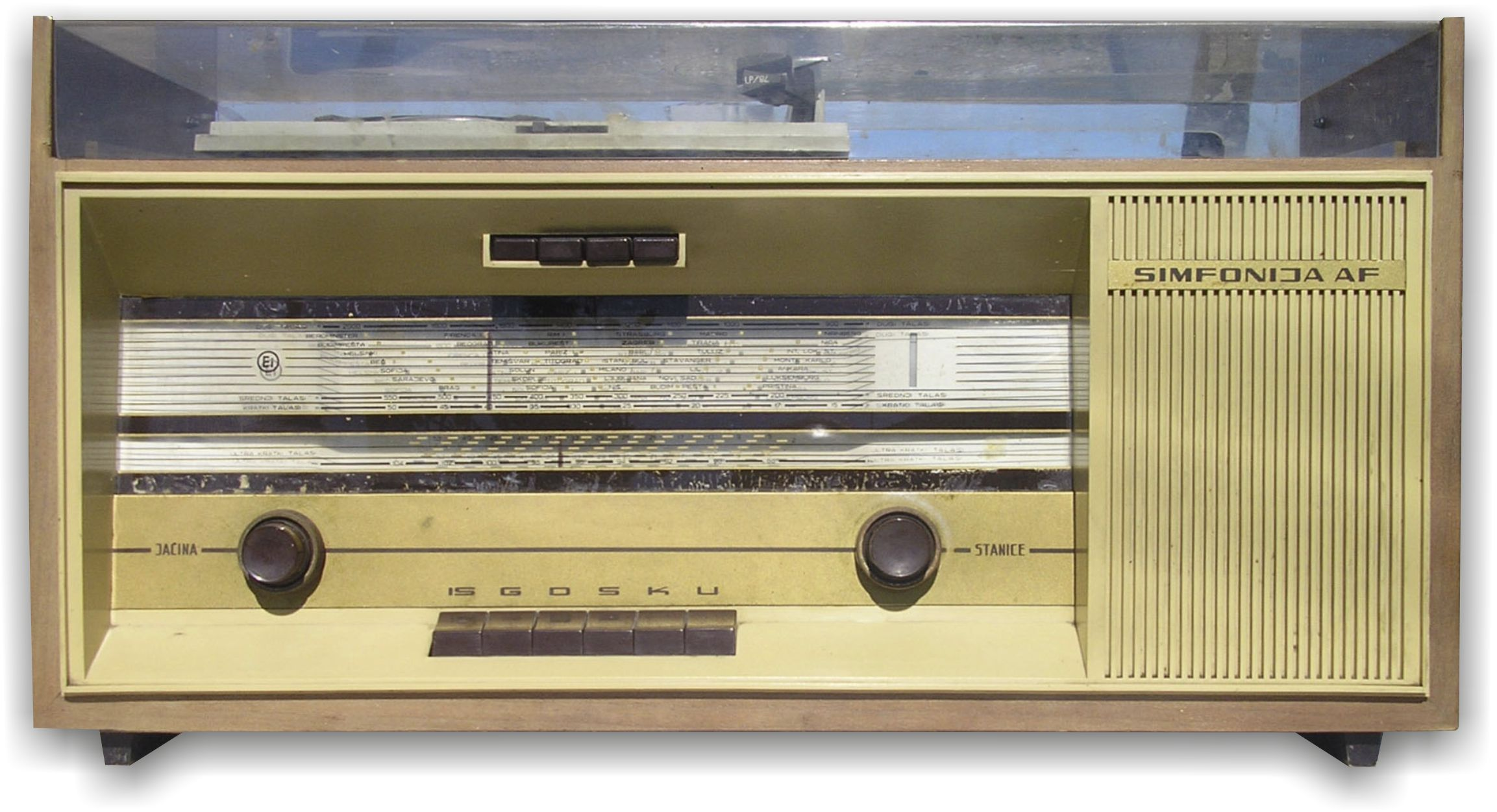
"Simfonija AF" – vacuum tube radio with record player (ca. 1970)

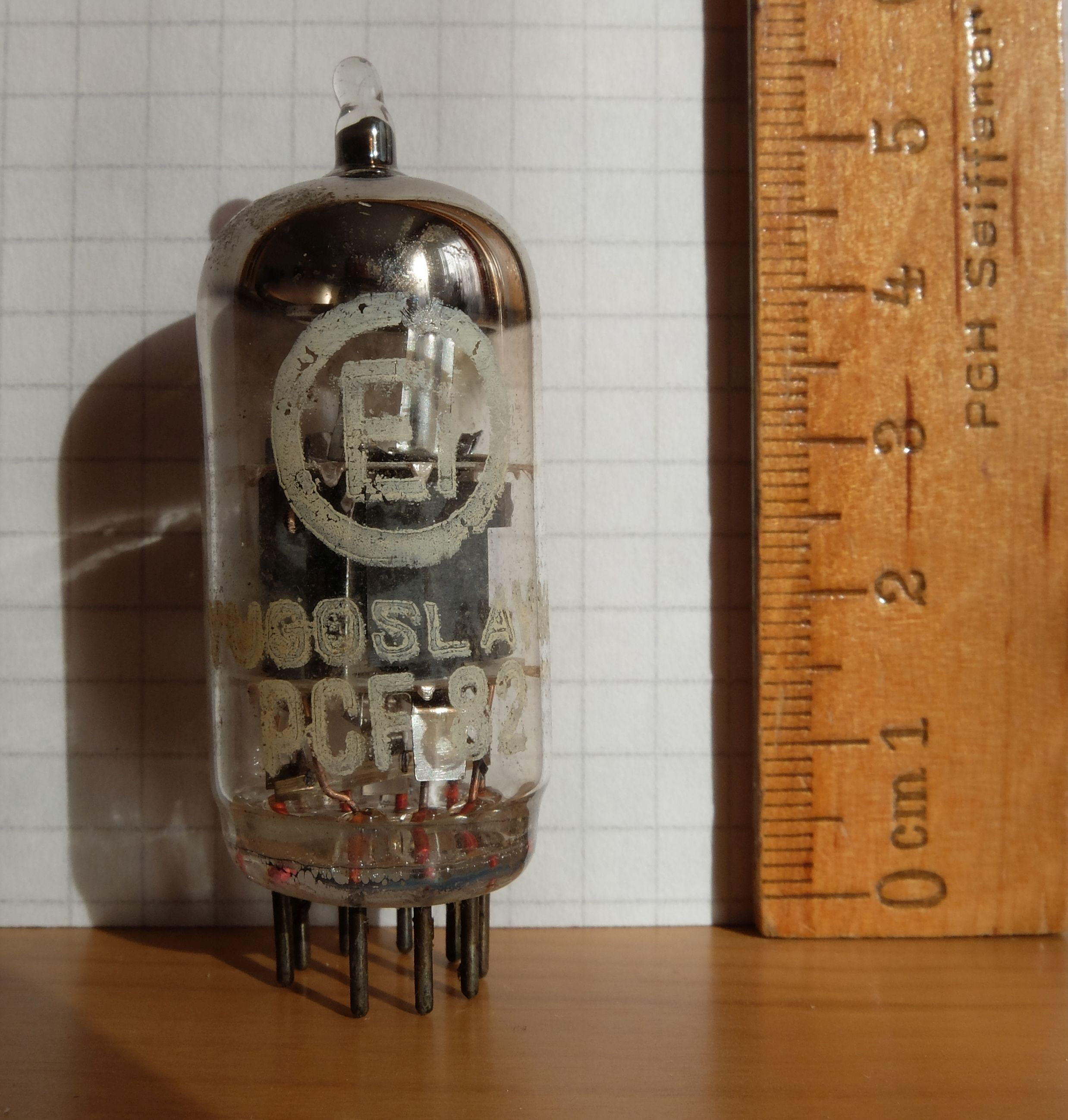
Ei PCF82 vacuum tube

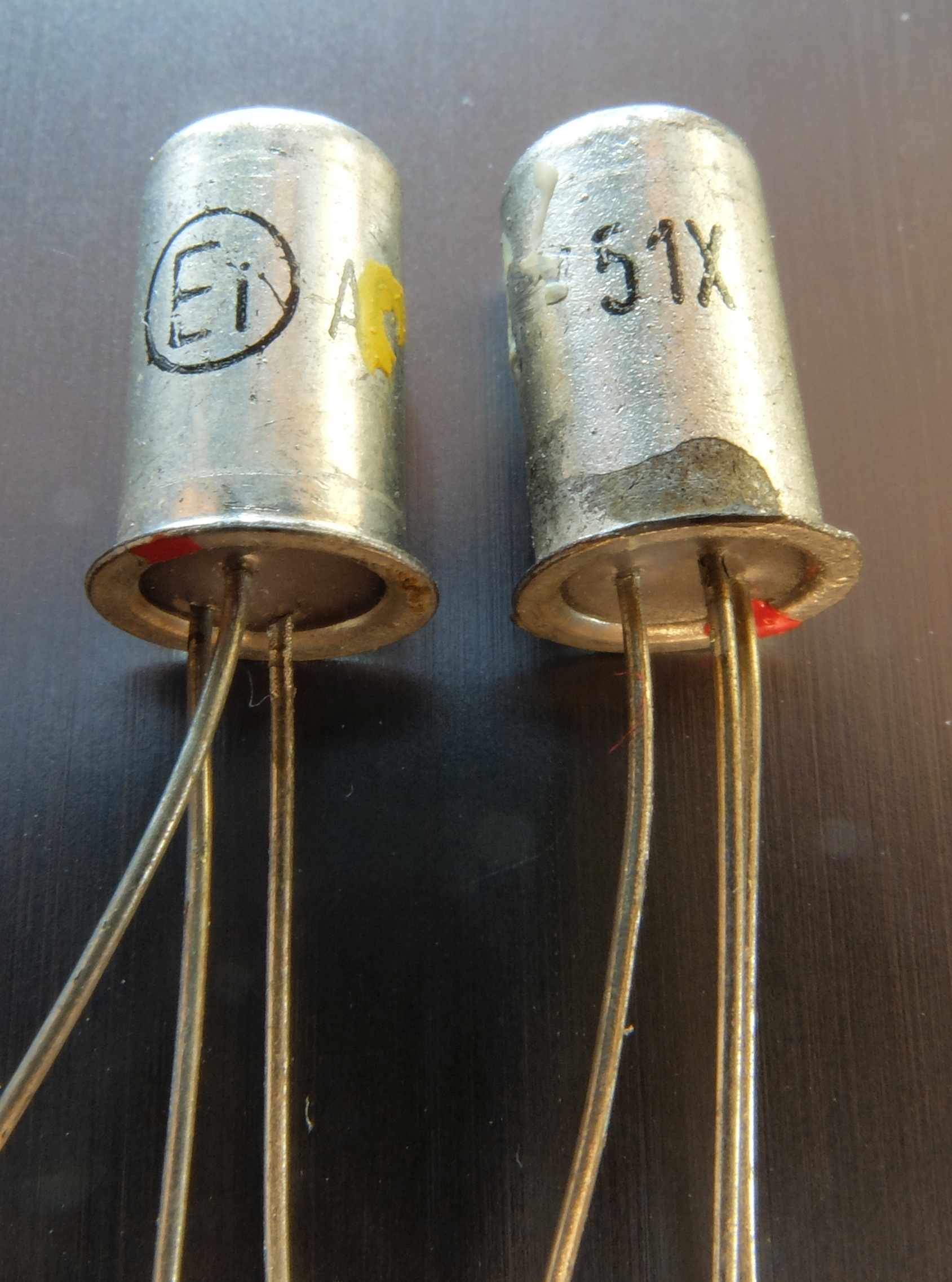
Ei ACY51X transistor

== See also ==
- History of computer hardware in Yugoslavia
- List of computer systems from Yugoslavia
- List of companies of the Socialist Federal Republic of Yugoslavia
