= GEM 1000 =

Belgian home computer

- Also known as: Charlemagne 999
- Developer: GEM International Corporation
- Type: Computer
- Released: 1983
- Operating system: BASIC
- CPU: Zilog Z80A @ 3.57 MHz
- Memory: 16 KB
- Removable storage: Cassette tape
- Display: 32×16 text in 8 colors; 128×64, 128×96, 128×192, 256×192 graphics with 2 background and 3 foreground colors
- Graphics: MC6847P
- Sound: AY-3-8910
- Input: 50 key QWERTY keyboard
- Marketing target: Children
- Related: CCE MC-1000, Rabbit RX83

The GEM 1000 Junior Computer, also known as Charlemagne 999, was a 1983 microcomputer sold in Belgium by Vidéo Direct International (VDI). It was a low cost toy home computer for children from 5 years upwards, produced by Taiwan based GEM International Corporation. It was part of a family consisting of the GEM-2000 Family Mini-Computer, GEM-3000 Family Super Computer and the GEM-4000 Professional Computer.

The GEM 1000 used a Z80A CPU running at 3.57 MHz, had 16 KB of RAM, and a chiclet 50 key QWERTY keyboard. BASIC commands were typed by pressing a single key using a dialect similar to Applesoft BASIC. The Charlemagne 999 model used French instead of English keywords.

The computer had a reported price of 7000 BEF in early 1984.

== Related machines ==
A similar machine, the Rabbit RX83 produced by Rabbit Computers of Hong Kong, was launched at the 1983 edition of the Consumer Electronics Show with a price of just US$99. Nevertheless the Rabbit only had 2 KB of RAM, limiting the display to 32×16 characters in 8 colors or 128×64 graphics with 2 background and 3 foreground colors.

Another computer based on the GEM 1000 was the Brazilian CCE MC-1000.

== Technical specifications ==
- CPU: Zilog Z80A, 3.57 MHz
- Memory: 16 KB RAM expandable to 64 KB; 8 KB ROM;
- Keyboard: 50-key chiclet keyboard
- Display: Motorola MC6847P (32×16 text in 8 colors; 128×64, 128×96, 128×192, 256×192 graphics with 2 background and 3 foreground colors)
- Sound: AY-3-8910 (3 voices and white noise)
- Ports: cassette recorder interface, TV output connector, joystick
