= Video Genie =

Series of computers produced by EACA

Video Genie System
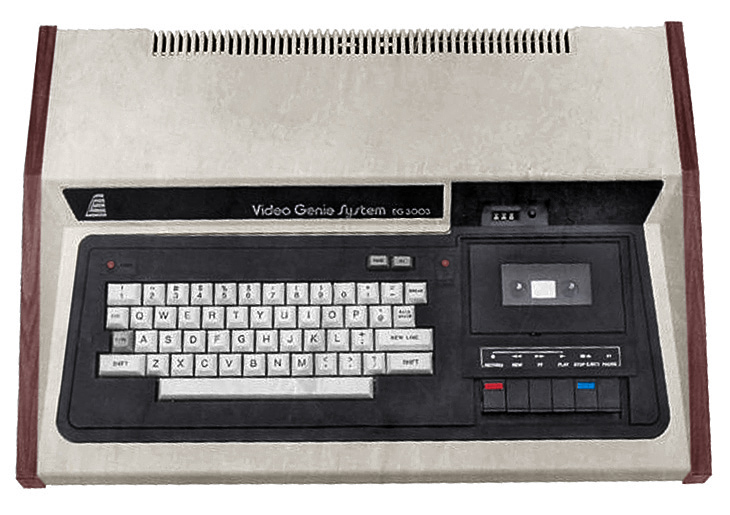
- The first version of the Video Genie System, including the right-hand Shift key that was replaced in later versions.
- Also known as: EG3003
- Manufacturer: EACA
- Released: 1980; 46 years ago
- Operating system: Microsoft LEVEL II BASIC
- CPU: Zilog Z80 @ 1.76 MHz
- Memory: 16 KB, expandable to 64 KB
- Removable storage: Cassette tape
- Display: Composite or RF monochrome TV; 64×16 / 32×16 characters; 128×48 semigraphics
- Input: 51-key keyboard

Video Genie (or simply Genie) is a discontinued series of computers produced by Hong Kong–based manufacturer EACA during the early 1980s. Computers from the Video Genie line are mostly compatible with the Tandy TRS-80 Model I computers and can be considered a clone, although there are hardware and software differences.

There are five machines in this series: Video Genie System (first version and second version), Genie I, II and III.

Although the Video Genie name was used in Western Europe, the machines were sold under different names in other countries. The Video Genie System was sold as the Dick Smith System 80 MK I in Australia and New Zealand. Likewise, the Genie II was sold as the Dick Smith System 80 MK II. In North America, the Video Genie System was sold as the Personal Microcomputers, Inc PMC-80 and the Genie II as the PMC-81. In South Africa, the Video Genie System was sold as the TRZ-80, a name similar to its rival.

In early 1983, the related Colour Genie machine was released by EACA.

== Video Genie series ==
=== Video Genie System (EG3003 first version) ===
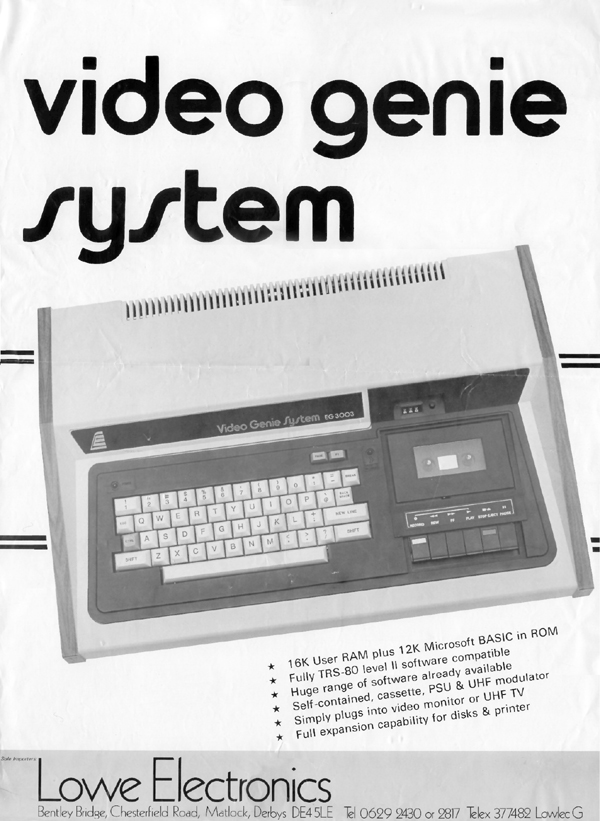
Video Genie - poster for first version.

This is the first version of the machine, released in early/mid 1980. It has only a 51-key keyboard and is missing the CLEAR and Tab ↹ keys, as compared to the Tandy TRS-80 Model I.

=== Video Genie System (EG3003 second version) ===
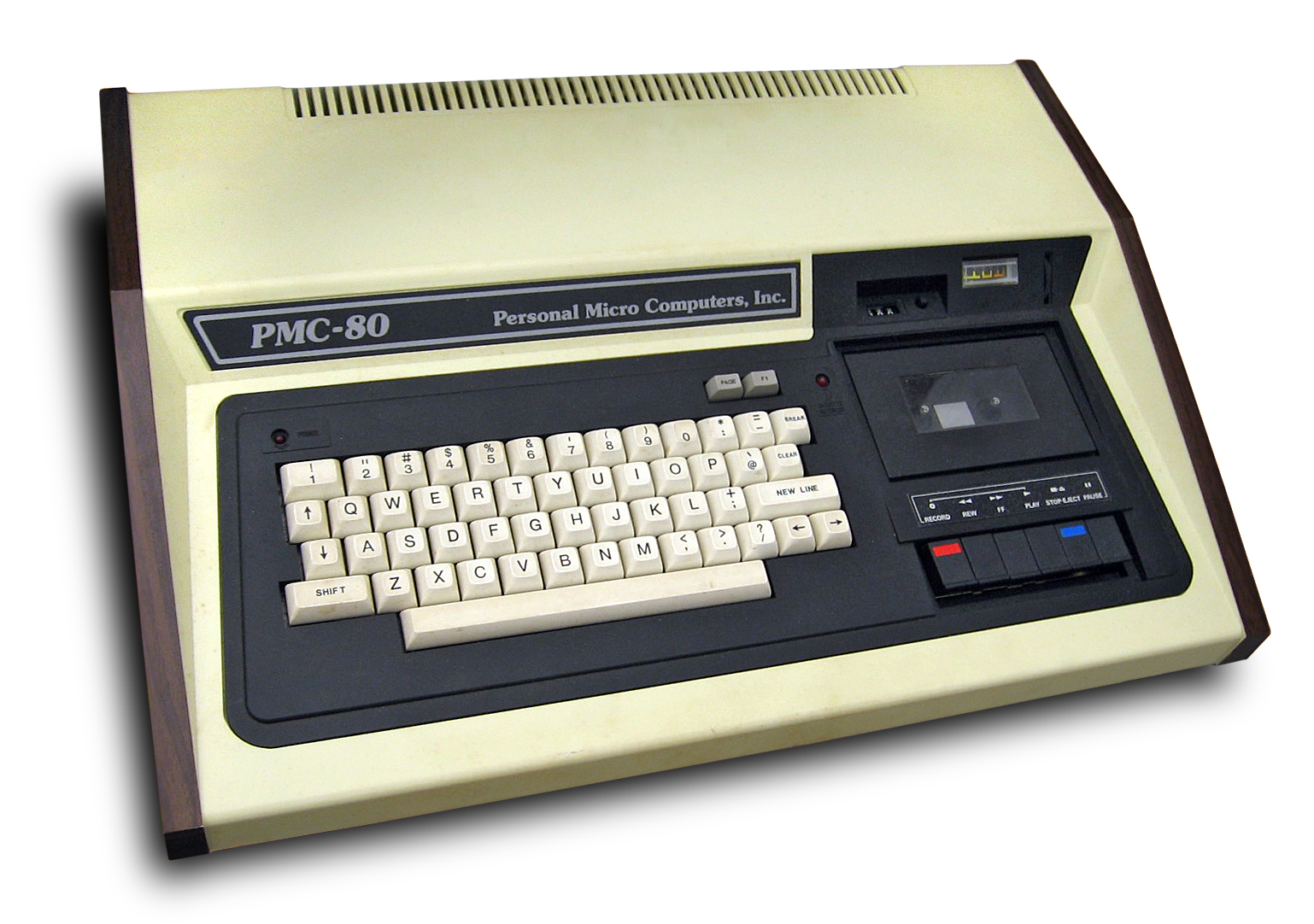
PMC-80, a rebadged Video Genie distributed in North America by Personal Microcomputers, Inc.

The second version of the machine was released in late 1980 and has a corrected keyboard, but sacrifices the right ⇧ Shift key. This version also includes a cassette-player VU-meter and volume control, a very helpful feature in loading software from cassettes.

=== Genie I (EG3003 third version) ===
The third version, introduced in late 1981 was named Genie I, and features inbuilt lowercase with drivers in the ROM extension. This ROM also contains an improved keyboard driver and a machine language monitor.

=== Genie II (EG3008) ===
The Genie II, also introduced in late 1981, has a 19-key keypad instead of the internal cassette deck. Also the keyboard was updated, adding the missing right shift key, making the keyboard 53+19 keys. It was intended for use with floppy drives, in conjunction with the EG3014 Expander.

=== Genie III (EG3200) ===
The Genie III, introduced in mid 1982, was a more business-oriented machine with CP/M-compatibility.

== Features ==
- CPU: Zilog Z80, at 1.76 MHz
- Video: Monochrome
  - 64×16 / 32×16 uppercase text
  - 128×48 block graphics
  - Composite video output, cable included
  - RF TV signal output, cable included
- 16 KB RAM, expandable to 48 KB
- 12 KB ROM containing Microsoft LEVEL II BASIC
- Storage: Built-in 500 baud cassette deck
  - Cable for using an external cassette deck included
- Built in power supply

== Peripherals ==
=== EG3014 Expander ===
The EG3014 Expander add-on corresponds to the Tandy TRS-80 Model I Expansion Interface. It has a Centronics printer port and a single density floppy interface for up to 4 single-sided or 3 double-sided drives. It also has sockets for adding two 16K banks of RAM (making it possible to expand to 48K RAM) and edge connectors for the EG3020 RS-232 interface and EG3022 S-100 bus interface. The EG3014 can also be expanded with the EG3021 double density kit.

=== EG3016 Parallel Printer Interface ===
Centronics printer port add-on.

== Lawsuit ==
In early 1981, Tandy Corporation sued Personal Microcomputers Inc., EACA's American subsidiary which sold the computers as the PMC-80 and -81. Tandy cited patent and copyright infringement of the TRS-80's microcode and ROM code, as well as trademark infringement with the "-80" branding. PMC maintained their innocence, charging that Tandy had not informed the company of copyright infringement before launching the suit and that Tandy was trying to eliminate competition. The two companies supposedly settled out of court.

== Reception ==
InfoWorld in April 1981 favorably reviewed the PMC-80. It reported that the computer was compatible with all tested software and several S-100 boards in the expansion interface, and found the integrated datacassette recorder to be very reliable. While criticizing the absence of a right shift key, the magazine concluded that "[t]he PMC-80 is a well-built alternative ... if you are considering buying a TRS-80 Model III, the PMC-80 ... costs less and has essentially the same performance and the bonus of S-100 expansion possibilities". A BYTE writer in January 1983 stated that "of all the business machines at the" Personal Computer World show, the EACA Genie III was "the one that caught my eye. Like the IBM Personal Computer, it is newsworthy not because it's innovative but because it carefully combines the best features of other computers".

== See also ==
- Colour Genie
