= DFC New Zealand Limited =

DFC New Zealand Limited was a state-owned enterprise that existed from 1964 to 1991, to provide venture capital and financial advice to industry.

== History ==
The Development Finance Corporation was established in 1964 as a joint venture between the New Zealand Government, the Reserve Bank of New Zealand, and the major trading banks of the time. In 1973, the Kirk Labour government assumed full control.

DFC operated two venture capital funds: the Applied Technology Programme and the Small Business Venture Capital Fund, which were both later merged into a single DFC Ventures fund.

Under the State Owned Enterprises Act 1986, it was corporatised as DFC New Zealand Limited. In 1988 it was sold to the National Provident Fund and Salomon Brothers.

DFC New Zealand Limited was placed into statutory management in 1989 and liquidated in 1991, after ill-fated investments in property speculation saddled it with a mountain of bad debts.

A successor of sorts, the New Zealand Venture Investment Fund, was established in 2001. Another, the Provincial Growth Fund, followed in 2017.
