= EACA =

EACA Industries Ltd
- Industry: Computer hardware
- Founded: 1972
- Defunct: 1983
- Fate: Wound Up
- Headquarters: 13 Chong Yip Street, Kwun Tong, Hong Kong
- Key people: Eric Chung Kwan-yee
- Products: Video Genie, Genie I, II, III, Colour Genie

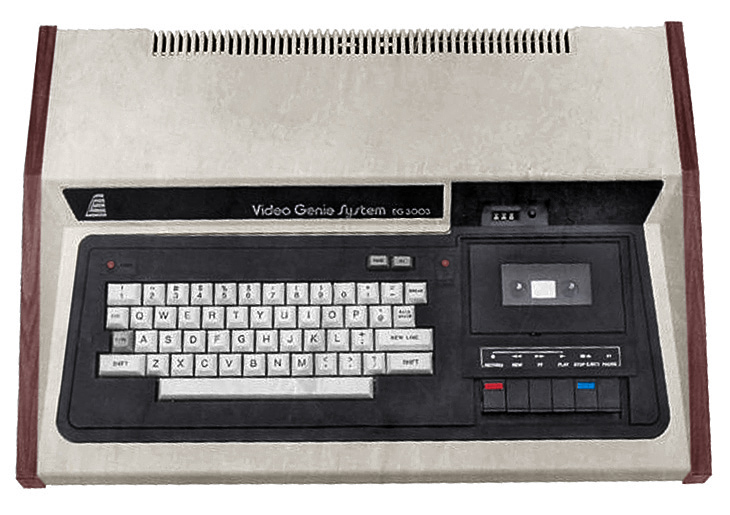
Video Genie (original version)

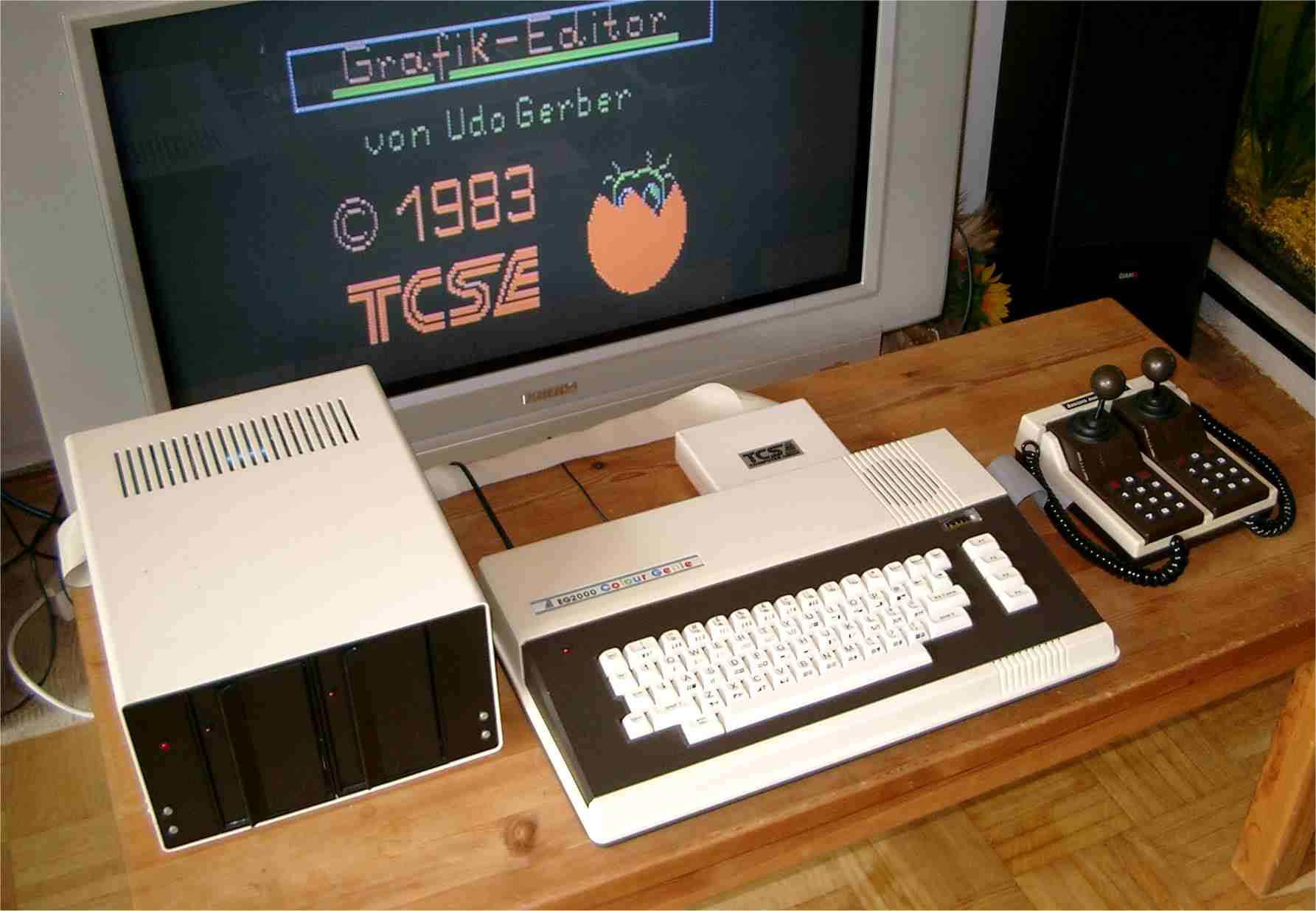
Colour Genie system including peripherals (with non-contemporary monitor)

EACA International Ltd was a Hong Kong manufacturer active from 1975 to 1983, producing Pong-style television video games, and later producing thousands of personal computers.

== Products ==
The company's products included the Video Genies I, II and III, (which were Tandy TRS-80 Model I-compatible) and the Colour Genie. Along with Radio Shack clones, they also produced Apple II computer compatible machines. In Australia and New Zealand the TRS-80 Model 1 clones were sold as the Dick Smith System 80. In the United States, the clones were marketed under EACA's Personal Microcomputers Inc. (PMC) subsidiary as the PMC-80. Tandy Corporation sued PMC (and EACA by extension) in early 1981, citing patent and copyright infringement of the TRS-80's microcode and ROM code, as well as trademark infringement with the "-80" branding. PMC maintained their innocence, charging that Tandy had not informed the company of copyright infringement before launching the suit and that Tandy was trying to eliminate competition. The two companies supposedly settled out of court.

== History ==
The EACA group of companies was established in December 1972 by Eric Chung Kwan-yee (alias Chung Bun), a businessman of humble beginnings from mainland China who stole into the then British colony from Guangzhou as a young man.

Just as distributors were promoting a new 16-bit machine in late 1983, the heavily indebted group went into liquidation at the hands of receivers.
