= Pecom 32 =

1985 home computer

- Developer: Elektronska Industrija Niš
- Type: Home computer
- Released: 1985; 41 years ago
- Media: Compact Cassette
- Operating system: BASIC 3, Assembler
- CPU: CDP 1802B 5V7 @ 2.813 MHz
- Memory: 36 kB (32 KB available to user)
- Display: VIS (CDP1869 + CDP1870)
- Graphics: 40 x 24 characters, semigraphics 240 x 216, 8 colors
- Sound: 8 octaves plus effects
- Related: Pecom 64

Pecom 32 is an educational and/or home computer developed by Elektronska Industrija Niš of Serbia in 1985. A few games and programs exist for the system.

== Specifications ==
- CPU: CDP 1802B 5V7 clocking at 2.813 MHz
- ROM: 16 KB with BASIC 3, optional 16 KB upgrade containing enhanced editor and assembler
- Primary memory: 36 KB (32 KB available to user)
- Secondary storage: cassette tape
- Display: 8-colours, text mode 24 lines with 40 characters each; pseudo-graphics 240 x 216 mode using user-defined characters
- Sound: 8 octaves plus effects (probably AY-3-8912)
- I/O ports: cassette tape storage, composite and RF video, RS-232 and expansion connector

== See also ==
- Pecom 64
