= Pecom 64 =

1985 home computer

- Developer: Elektronska Industrija Niš
- Type: Home computer
- Released: 1985; 41 years ago
- Media: Compact Cassette
- Operating system: BASIC, Assembler
- CPU: CDP 1802B 5V7 @ 2.813 MHz
- Memory: 32 kB
- Display: VIS (CDP1869 + CDP1870)
- Graphics: 40 x 24 characters, 240 x 216 equivalent resolution using semigraphics, 8 colors
- Sound: Two channels
- Related: Pecom 32

Pecom 64 was an educational and/or home computer developed by Elektronska Industrija Niš of Serbia in 1985. Modern emulators for the system exist, along with software preservation efforts.

== Specifications ==
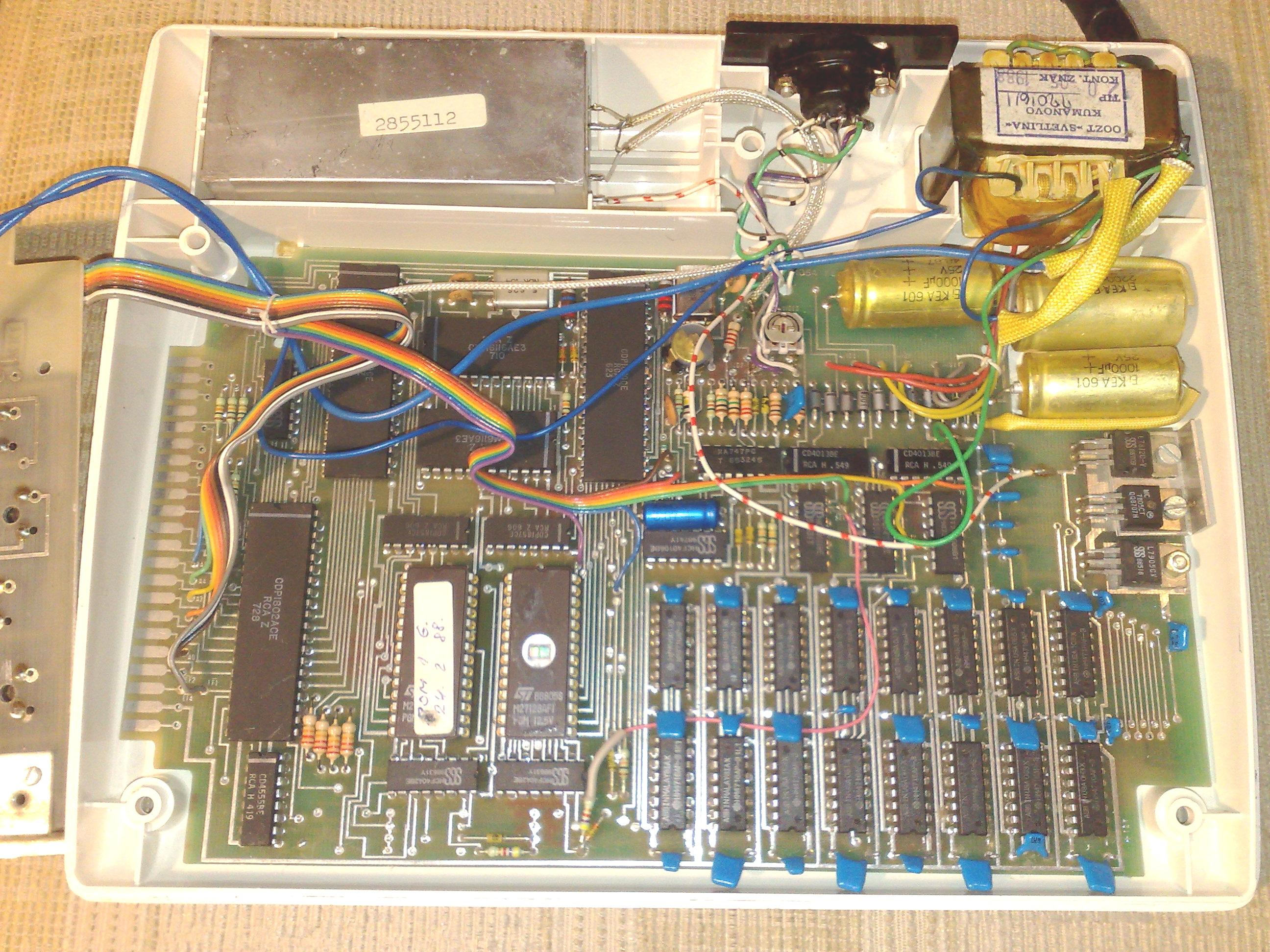
Pecom 64 PCB

The machine had the following specifications:

- CPU: CDP 1802B 5V7 running at 2.813 MHz
- ROM: 16 KB, with optional 16 KB upgrade containing enhanced editor and assembler
- RAM: 32 KB
- Secondary storage: cassette tape
- VIS: (Video Interface System) CDP1869 / CDP1870
  - Text modes: 40 columns x 24 lines
  - Character set: 128 Programmable characters
  - Character size: 6x9 pixels
  - Graphics modes: None, but the character-set was re programmable (semigraphics) to simulate a 240x216 High Resolution display
  - Colours: A total of 8 foreground colours are available (with a limited choice of 4 per character and 1 per line of that character) and 8 background colours (defined for the whole screen).
- Sound: 2 channels: one for tone generation with a span of 8 octaves, and 1 for special effect/white noise. Volume programmable in 16 steps.
- I/O ports:cassette tape storage, composite and RF video, RS-232 and expansion connector
- Power supply: 220V AC, 0.02 A, 4.5 W (built-in transformer)

== See also ==
- Pecom 32
- Very similar HW and BASIC as used in the Comx-35
