= History of computing in Poland =

The history of Polish computing (informatics) began during the Second World War with breaking the Enigma machine code by Polish mathematicians. After World War II, work on Polish computers began. Poles made a significant contribution to both the theory and technique of world computing.

In the State Institute of Mathematics, established in 1948 (from 1952 at the Polish Academy of Sciences), it was decided to start prospective work on the construction of at least one machine comparable to the American ENIAC. For this purpose, the Mathematical Apparatus Group of this Institute (pol. Grupa Aparatów Matematycznych, GAM) was established. The first engineering employee of GAM was Leon Łukaszewicz, and shortly after he was joined by his fellow students, Romuald Marczyński and Krystyn Bochenek. Logician and statistician Henryk Greniewski became the head of GAM. There were no resources to build such a computer - neither technical facilities, nor electronic equipment, nor experience. The only chance was given by the enthusiasm and alleged talent of a few newly promoted engineers.

== Polish computer hardware designs in 1958-1986 ==
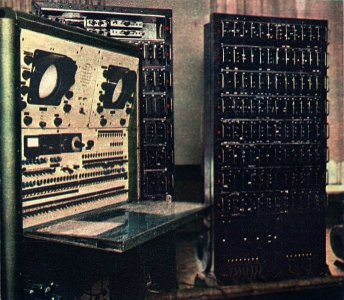
XYZ, a Polish computer developed in 1958.

=== Odra ===
Some of the earliest computers created in Poland were the first Odra computers. They were manufactured at the Elwro manufacturing plant in Wrocław, (the brand name comes from the Odra River that flows through the city of Wrocław) and exported to other communist countries. The production started in 1959–1960. The last series of Odra computers—the Odra 1300—consisted of three models: the Odra 1304, 1305, and the 1325. The hardware was developed by Polish teams to run the software for the above machines provided by the British company ICL. The Odra 1300 models were designed to be ICL 1900 compatible.

=== K-202 ===
K-202 was 16-bit minicomputer built by Jacek Karpiński in 1971. It was faster and cheaper than most of the world's production at this time, and more advanced than IBM PC released decade later, but the mass production was never started because of political reasons and dependence on western parts; it was not compatible with the ES EVM standard.

=== Meritum ===
Produced by Mera-Elzab, Meritum I and II models were created in 1983 and 1985 respectively. Based on U880DA CPU (Zilog Z80 clone), with 16 and 48KB RAM, were based on the TRS-80 computer. They were intended primarily for scientific, engineering and office applications.

=== Elwro Junior ===
Elwro 800 Junior (1986) and Elwro 804 Junior PC (1990) were ZX Spectrum clones intended for schools, and for home use respectively. The 804 model had a 3.5" disk drive built in; the drive was available as an accessory for 800 (the alternative mass storage being a tape recorder). The computers used the Z80A CPU, 64KB RAM and 24KB ROM. The ROM contained either CP/J (a variant of CP/M) operating system, or Spectrum-compatible BASIC.

=== Cobra 1 ===
The Cobra 1 was a 8-bit home and industrial microcomputer based on the Zilog Z80A processor, intended to be assembled by the end user. It was not a clone of an existing computer. The diagram and description of the computer were published in a series of articles in the Polish magazine Audio Video between 1984 and 1986.

=== Mazovia ===
Mazovia was a Polish clone of IBM PC/XT.

== Polish computer scientists ==
- Grzegorz Rozenberg - researcher in fields of natural computing, formal language and automata theory, graph transformations, and concurrent systems. He is referred to as the guru of natural computing.
- Janusz Brzozowski - known for his contributions to mathematical logic, circuit theory, and automata theory, focused on regular expressions and on syntactic semigroups of formal languages.
- Andrew Targowski - contributed to the areas of enterprise computing, societal computing, information technology impact upon civilization, information theory, wisdom theory, and civilization theory.
- Jacek Karpiński - main creator of K-202, contributed to areas of machine learning algorithms, techniques for character and image recognition.
- Jan Węglarz - one of creators of Elwro 800 Junior, currently specializing in operations research.
- Zenon Kulpa - known for his work on diagrammatic representation and diagrammatic reasoning.

Pawlak Machine, a model of computation invented by Zdzisław Pawlak.

== The largest Polish IT companies ==
- CD Projekt Red - is a video game developer, publisher and distributor based in Warsaw.
- Goodram - the largest Polish manufacturer of RAM, flash drive and SD cards.

== Polish Information Processing Society ==
The Polish Information Processing Society (also known as Polish Informatics Society) is the oldest Polish organization that associates professionals from the computing industry. They act for their environment, as well as the social and economic environment. As part of its statutory activities, the Polish Informatics Society speaks on behalf of the surrounding community in the most important issues related to computerization, is consulted in legislative processes, and conducts certification and appraisal activities. They also organize a series of conferences, meetings and thematic workshops aimed at improving competences and integrating IT specialists. They are also working to increase general digital skills in society. They effectively promote Poland by showing the global successes of their computer scientists and unique digital technology products created in Poland.

== See also ==
- History of computer hardware in Yugoslavia
- Computer systems in the Soviet Union
- History of computing in Romania
- History of computer hardware in Bulgaria
