= History of computing in Romania =

The first efforts to build electronic computers in Romania began at the Institute of Atomic Physics (IFA), where the first computer in Romania of the 1st generation (with electronic tubes) was developed, during 1954 to 1957, under the leadership of Victor Toma (honorary member of the Romanian Academy), with the name CIFA-1, within the Electronics Section of IFA, under the scientific direction of academician Tudor Tănăsescu. The experimental model CIFA-1 was followed by several improved versions and related systems, including tube-based replicas and later transistorized computers such as CIFA-10X and CET-50X.

With the development of CIFA-1 in 1957, Romania became one of the earliest countries to design and build an electronic digital computer, being widely regarded as the eight country in the world to achieve this milestone.

The construction of CET-500, the first fully transistorized Romanian computer, represented another major milestone in Romanian computing. With its completion, Romania became the 11th country in the world to build a fully transistorized computer.

Other first and second-generation electronic computers were made in Timişoara, under the name MECIPT (Electronic Computing Machine of the Timişoara Polytechnic Institute) – MECIPT-1 in 1961, MECIPT-2 in 1965 and MECIPT-3 in 1967–1974 (unfinished), being built by a team including Wilhelm Löwenfeld, Iosif Kaufmann, Vasile Baltac, Dan Farcaş, Gavril Gavrilescu and Ştefan Măruşter.

This was followed in Cluj by the DACICC series (an acronym for Dispozitiv Automat de Calcul al Institutului de Calcul din Cluj, “Automatic Computing Device of the Institute of Computing in Cluj”): the DACICC-1, completed in 1963, and the DACICC-200, completed in 1968. The machines were developed under the direction of academician Tiberiu Popoviciu by engineers M. Bocu, Gh. Farkas, B. Azzolla, I. Juhasz, M. Rosmann, T. Mureșan, D. Beloiu, M. Mușteanu, and M. Pătru, together with mathematicians E. Muntean, L. Negrescu, T. Rus, S. Hannes, V. Costea, St. Nițchi, W. Schuster, S. Laslău-Popescu, and M. Mitrov. DACICC-1 was the first Romanian computer using transistors (although it was not fully transistorized) and the first Romanian computer to use ferrite-core internal memory. DACICC-200 was the first Romanian computer to feature an operating system and compiler, as well as hardwired arithmetic instructions.

== Timeline ==
- CIFA-1 (1954–1957) (1st generation) (Bucharest) "The Atomic Physics Institute Computer", the first electronic computer in Romania, built under the guidance of Victor Toma. It features: 1,500 electronic tubes; 50 operations per second.
- MARICA (1959) (electromagnetic relays) (Cluj-Napoca) “Automatic Relay Machine of the Computing Institute of the Academy”, an experimental relay computer built by M. Rossman at the Computing Institute of the Romanian Academy.
- In the same year, CIFA2 (generation 1) (Bucharest) was built at the Institute of Atomic Physics, under the guidance of Victor Toma.
- MECIPT-1 (1957-1961) (1st generation) (Timișoara) "Electronic Computing Machine of the Timișoara Polytechnic Institute", built at the Timișoara Polytechnic by a team consisting of Wilhelm Löwenfeld and Iosif Kaufmann. It is considered the second electronic computer built in Romania, and the first electronic computer built at a Romanian university. Features: 2,000 electronic tubes; magnetic drum memory with 1,024 31-bit words (approximately 4 KB); 50-70 operations per second.
- CIFA3 (1961) (generation 1) (Bucharest), built at the Institute of Atomic Physics under the direction of Victor Toma.
- CIFA-101 (1962) (1st generation) (Bucharest), built at the Institute of Atomic Physics under the guidance of Armand Segal. Features: 50-2,000 operations per second; internal memory: 4k words of 4 bits each.
- Also in 1962, CIFA4 (1st generation) (Bucharest), built at the Institute of Atomic Physics under the guidance of Victor Toma.
- DACICC-1 (1959-1963) (1st generation) (Cluj-Napoca) (Automatic Computing Device of the Cluj Computing Institute). Considered the third electronic computer built in Romania, it was developed under the leadership of academician Tiberiu Popoviciu by a team consisting of engineers Gh. Farkas , M. Bocu , B. Azzolla, I. Juhasz and M. Rossmann, and mathematicians E. Muntean, L. Negrescu and T. Rus. DACICC-1 had two notable features:
  - it was the first electronic computer in the country to have transistors (but not completely transistorized)
  - it was the first electronic computer in the country to have ferrite-based internal memory.

Other features: a 100 kHz clock frequency, allowing up to 2,000 additions per second. It remained in operation for nearly a decade and was used to solve numerous practical problems. Its use also contributed to the emergence of the so-called Cluj School of Numerical Analysis and Approximation Theory.

- CET500 (1964) (2nd generation) (Bucharest), "Transistorized Electronic Computer": built at the Institute of Atomic Physics under the guidance of Victor Toma. Features:
  - the first fully transistorized computer built in Romania.
  - with CET500, Romania became the 11th country in the world to build a fully transistorized computer.
  - 5,000 operations per second.
- CIFA102 (1964) (1st generation) (Bucharest) built at the Institute of Atomic Physics, under the guidance of Armand Segal. Features: 50-2,000 operations per second; internal memory: 4k words, 4 bits.
- MECIPT-2 (1963-1965) (2nd generation) (Timișoara) ("Electronic Computing Machine of the Timișoara Polytechnic Institute"), built at the Timișoara Polytechnic by a team lead of Wilhelm Löwenfeld , Iosif Kaufmann and Vasile Baltac . Characteristics: 10000 operations per second.
- CET501 (2nd generation) (Bucharest) (“Transistorized Electronic Computer”): built at the Institute of Atomic Physics, under the direction of Victor Toma. Features: 12,000 operations per second.
- DACICC-200 (1963–1968) (2nd generation) (Cluj-Napoca) ("Automatic Computing Device of the Cluj Computing Institute"). It was built under the leadership of Tiberiu Popoviciu by a team of engineers consisting of M. Bocu, Gh. Farkas, I. Juhasz, T. Mureșan, D. Beloiu, M. Mușteanu, and M. Pătru, with software developed by the mathematicians E. Muntean, Șt. Nițchi, L. Negrescu, T. Rus, S. Hannes, V. Costea, W. Schuster, S. Laslău Popescu, and M. Mircu. DACICC-200 was the first Romanian computer to feature an operating system and a compiler (DACICC-FORTRAN). Before the production of licensed computers in Romania, it had the country's most advanced capabilities, and some of its features even surpassed those of the first licensed computers, including a performance of 200,000 operations per second and 24-bit floating-point numbers, compared with 16-bit floating-point numbers on the IRIS computers. It also featured advanced capabilities for its time, including hard-wired floating-point arithmetic (providing direct floating-point instructions rather than slower emulated ones), modular memory, instruction overlap (overlapping the preparation of one instruction with the execution of the previous one), and functional parallelism between memory modules, a feature comparable to techniques later used in multiprocessor parallel computers.
- MECIPT-3 (1967–1974) (2nd generation) (Timișoara), built at the Timișoara Polytechnic Institute but never completed. It was intended to be equipped with 4 Ki words of 38-bit ferrite-core memory.

== HC family ==
The Romanian computers HC family (HC 85, HC 85+, HC 88, HC 90, HC 91 and HC 2000) were clones of the ZX Spectrum produced at ICE Felix from 1985 to 1994. HC 85 was first designed at Institutul Politehnic București by Prof. Dr. Ing. Adrian Petrescu (in laboratory), then redesigned at ICE Felix (in order to be produced at industrial scale). Their operating system was a BASIC interpreter.

== aMIC ==
aMIC (microcomputer) was a Romanian microcomputer designed by Prof. Adrian Petrescu at Institutul Politehnic București in 1982, later produced at Fabrica de Memorii in Timișoara.

== MARICA and DACICC ==
MARICA and the DACICC family (DACICC-1 and DACICC-200) were Romanian computers produced in 1959–1968 at T. Popoviciu Institute of Numerical Analysis, Cluj-Napoca.

== Felix series ==
Felix PC was a Romanian IBM-PC compatible produced at ICE Felix in 1985–1990.

Felix C was a family of Romanian computers produced by ICE Felix from 1970 to 1978. They were similar to IBM/360; their operating system was SIRIS.

Felix M was a family of Romanian mini and microcomputers in 1975–1984.

== CoBra ==
CoBra was a Romanian personal computer produced at I.T.C.I Brașov, in 1986.

== Independent ==
Independent minicomputer series was a series of Romanian minicomputers, manufactured from 1983 to 1989. They were compatible with DEC-PDP 11–34, running RSX-11M operating system. They were produced at ITC Timișoara, with memory chips also produced in Timișoara.

== See also ==
- Electronics industry in the Socialist Republic of Romania
- History of computer hardware in Yugoslavia
- Computer systems in the Soviet Union
- History of computing in Poland
- History of computer hardware in Bulgaria
