= Cobra 1 =

- Type: Microcomputer
- Released: 1984
- Operating system: Machine code monitor
- CPU: Zilog Z80A
- Memory: 16–48 KB RAM + 2 KB ROM
- Storage: Cassette tape

Cobra 1 was a Polish 8-bit home and industrial microcomputer based on a Zilog Z80A processor, designed by Andrzej Sirko. It was intended to be assembled by the end user.

The diagram and description of the computer were published in a series of articles in the Polish magazine Audio Video, starting with Issue 1/84. Since the magazine was only published quarterly, the design was already obsolete by the time the series was finished in 1986.

Although the Cobra 1 used the Zilog Z80A as its CPU, its design was original and not compatible with existing systems. This is in contrast to other Polish microcomputers of the time, such as the Meritum (based on the TRS-80) or the Elwro 800 Junior (a clone of the ZX Spectrum).

Sirko initially wanted state-owned enterprises to produce computer components for user assembly, but this was ignored by the authorities, and anyone who wanted the computer had to build it entirely themselves.

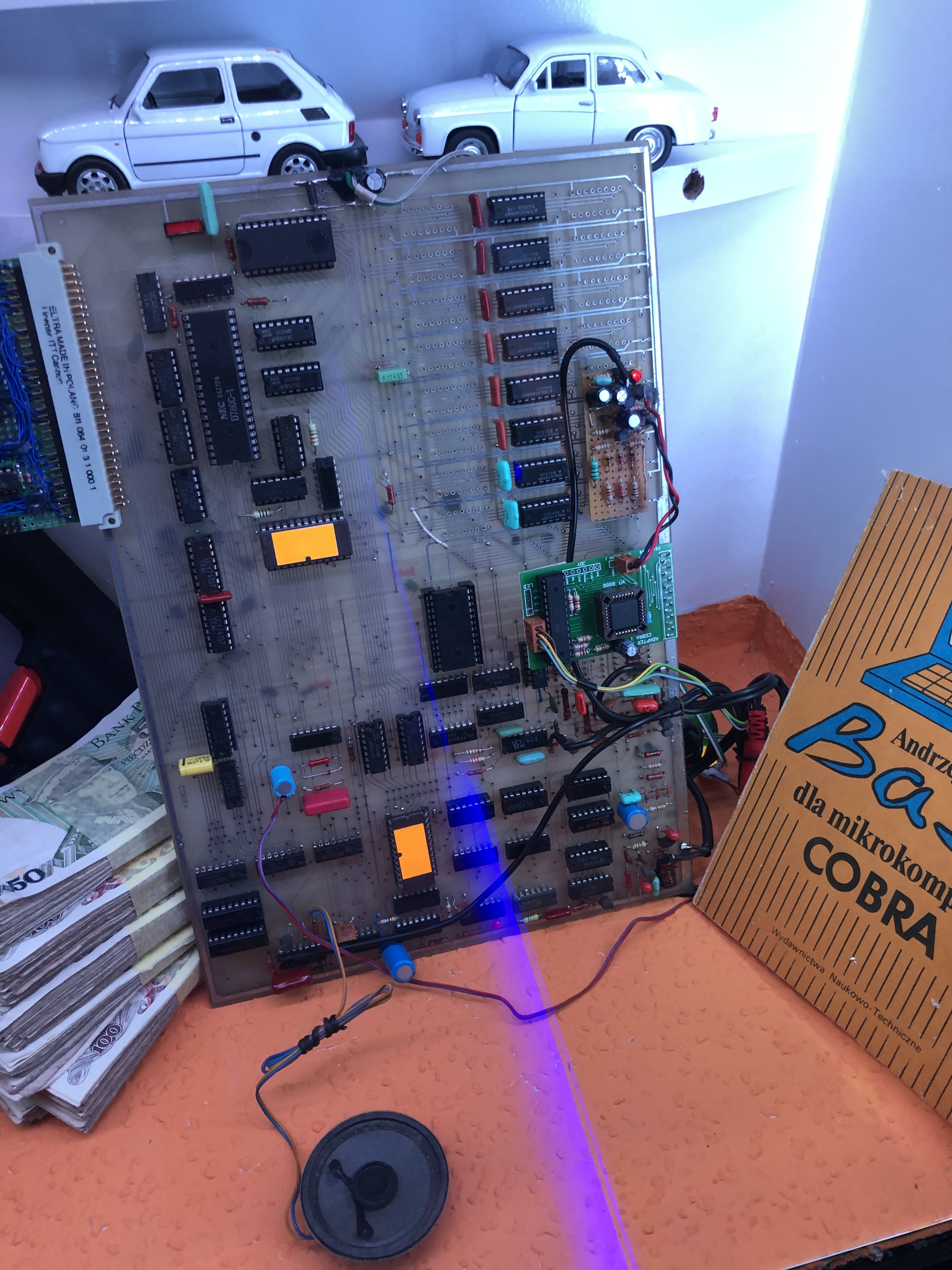
Original Cobra 1 microcomputer motherboard from the 1980s, from the Pixel Mania collection in Władysławowo, Poland

== Specifications ==
- Processor: Zilog Z80A 3.25 MHz
- Memory:
  - RAM: 4116 systems: 16–48 KB; 4164 systems: 16–64 KB
  - Fixed EPROM: 2 KB
- Graphics:
  - Character mode only — set of 64 characters, expandable to 256
  - Text: 32×24 characters, each character 8x8 pixels
  - Colors: black and white, expandable to 8 brightness levels
- Sound: 1 channel
- Ports: PIO 1x74S412 (support for keyboard and cassette tape recorder)
- Input/output
  - Basic:
    - Reed switch keyboard
    - Monitor: TV
    - Mass storage: cassette tape, read/write speed of 300 and 1200 bits per second
  - Additional:
    - Printer port:
      - D-100
      - Seikosha GP-500A
      - Teleprinter
    - Mass storage: 5¼″ 360 kB floppy drive
- Software:
  - Operating system: machine code monitor in permanent memory
  - Programming languages: BASIC, assembly language, machine code
- Date of development: 1984–1986 (described in eight articles, with later additions)
- Developed by Andrzej Sirko and supplemented by readers
- Cost of a computer with 16 KB memory at 1984 prices: PLZ 32,000 (approx. PLN 3,050 or US$727 in 2017)

== See also ==
- History of computing in Poland
- History of computer hardware in Eastern Bloc countries

== Bibliography ==
- Audio Video Issues 1/1984–1988
- Sirko, Andrzej (1986). Basic dla komputera Cobra 1 [BASIC for the Cobra 1 Computer] (in Polish). Warszawa: Wydawnictwo Naukowo Techniczne. ISBN 83-204-0822-9.
