= Felix MC =

The Felix MC was a Romanian microcomputer developed in 1974 at the Politehnica University of Bucharest by professors Adrian Petrescu, Trandafir Moisa, and Nicolae Țăpuș, and subsequently manufactured in series by ICE Felix. It was among the earliest microcomputers produced in the Eastern Bloc.

The laboratory model was designated MC3; ICE Felix took it over for technological redesign and brought it into production as the Felix MC-8. Approximately 100 units were manufactured over the roughly two years of production.

In recognition of the novelty of the development, the Romanian Academy awarded the team the Premiul Traian Vuia (Traian Vuia Prize).

== Hardware ==
The central processing unit was based on the Intel 8008 processor and was built on a single board. Since the 8008 was manufactured in PMOS technology and had a low level of integration, extensive additional logic was required to generate the signals needed by the processor and peripherals. The processor operated at 500 kHz with a two-phase clock and required +5 V and −9 V power supplies. It provided interrupt inputs as well as synchronisation and ready signals for memory and peripherals.

As PROM/EPROM chips were unavailable at the time, there was no way to permanently store monitor or loader programs. To load a program from punched tape, a bootstrap loader first had to be entered manually via the front panel (equipped with switches, pushbuttons, and LEDs). The front panel also allowed test programs for individual system modules to be entered and executed step by step.

== Software ==
Software for the Felix MC-8 was developed both on the microprocessor system itself and as cross-software on the Felix C-256 mainframe. On the microprocessor system, the following were available:

- monitor;
- assembler;
- library for accessing files on magnetic cassette;
- various application programs.

The cross-software on the Felix C-256 comprised a monitor, assembler, and simulator. Most applications for the Felix MC-8 were developed using the Felix C-256's development tools.

| Specification | Felix MC-8 |
|---|---|
| Processor | Intel 8008, 500 kHz |
| Type | Microcomputer |
| Production | 1974–1977 |
| Units produced | approx. 100 |
| Peripherals | alphanumeric console, electric typewriter, mini-printer, punched tape, magnetic cassettes |
| Price | 400,000 lei (1975) |

== See also ==
- History of computing in Romania
