= History of computer hardware in Eastern Bloc countries =

The history of computing hardware in the Eastern Bloc is somewhat different from that of the Western world. As a result of the CoCom embargo, computers could not be imported on a large scale from Western Bloc.

Eastern Bloc manufacturers created copies of Western designs based on intelligence gathering and reverse engineering. This redevelopment led to some incompatibilities with International Electrotechnical Commission (IEC) and IEEE standards, such as spacing integrated circuit pins at 1/10 of a 25 mm length (colloquially a "metric inch") instead of a standard inch of 25.4 mm. This made Soviet chips unsellable on the world market outside the Comecon, and made test machinery more expensive.

== History ==
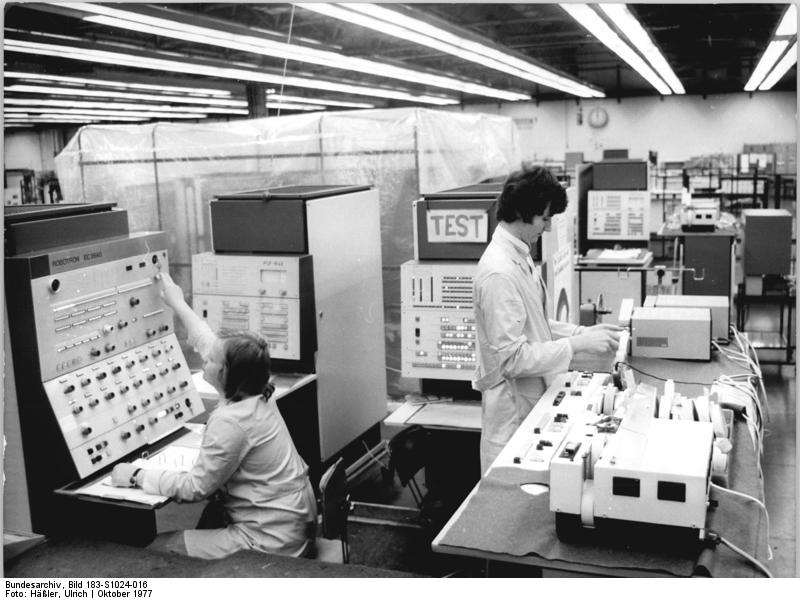
The ES-1040 mainframe in Dresden, East Germany

By the end of the 1950s most COMECON countries had developed experimental computer designs, yet none of them had managed to create a stable computer industry.

In October 1962 the "Commission for Scientific Problems in Computing" (Комиссия Научные Вопросы Вычислительной Техники, КНВВТ) was founded in Warsaw and modelled after the International Federation for Information Processing.

Computer design and production began to be coordinated between the Comecon countries in 1964, when the Edinaya Sistema mainframe (Unified System, ES, also known as RIAD) was introduced. The project also included plans for the development of a joint Comecon computer network.

Each COMECON country was given a role in the development of the ES: Hungary was responsible for software development, while East Germany improved the design of disk storage devices. The ES-1040 was successfully exported to countries outside the Comecon, including India, Yugoslavia and China. Each country specialized in a model of the ES series: R-10 in the case of Hungary, R-20 in Bulgaria, R-20A in Czechoslovakia, R-30 in Poland and R-40 in East Germany.

Nairi-3, developed at the Armenian Institute for Computers, was the first third-generation computer in the Comecon area, using integrated circuits. Development on the Nairi system began in 1964, and it went into serial production in 1969.

In 1969 the Intergovernmental Commission for Computer Technology was founded to coordinate computer production. Other cooperation initiatives included the establishment of joint Comecon development facilities in Moscow and Kiev. The R-300 computer, released in 1969, demonstrated the technical and managerial skills of VEB Robotron, and established a leading role for East Germany in the joint development efforts. The relative success of Robotron was attributed to its greater organizational freedom, and the profit motive of securing export orders. In 1970, Cuba produced its first digital computer, the CID-201.

By 1972 the Comecon countries had produced around 7,500 computers, compared to 120,000 in the rest of the world. The USSR, Czechoslovakia, East Germany, Poland, Bulgaria and Romania had all set up computer production and research institutes. Collaboration between Romania and the other countries was limited, due to the autarkic policies of Nicolae Ceaușescu.

The availability of western computing hardware differed considerably between communist countries; in the early 1970s they were most common in Czechoslovakia, where a licensing agreement was signed with the French Groupe Bull. Non-Soviet Eastern European countries had more access to Western technology, which allowed them to manufacture more sophisticated computer equipment.

In 1983 the representatives of the national academies of sciences of the Comecon countries met in Sofia to discuss the development of a new generation of computer systems. In June 1985 the “Conception of a new generation of computer systems” was approved in Prague, with the objective of creating a socialist response to the Japanese fifth generation computer initiative. The document planned the development of the IT industry in socialist countries up to the year 2010.

In 1985 Ukrainian researchers managed to reverse-engineer the ZX Spectrum chip and built a hardware clone using readily available parts. Over 50 different versions of the Spectrum were created in Eastern Bloc countries over the next few years, including the Hobbit, Baltica, Pentagon, Scorpion, Leningrad, Didaktik (Czechoslovakia), Spectral (East Germany) and Cobra (Romania).

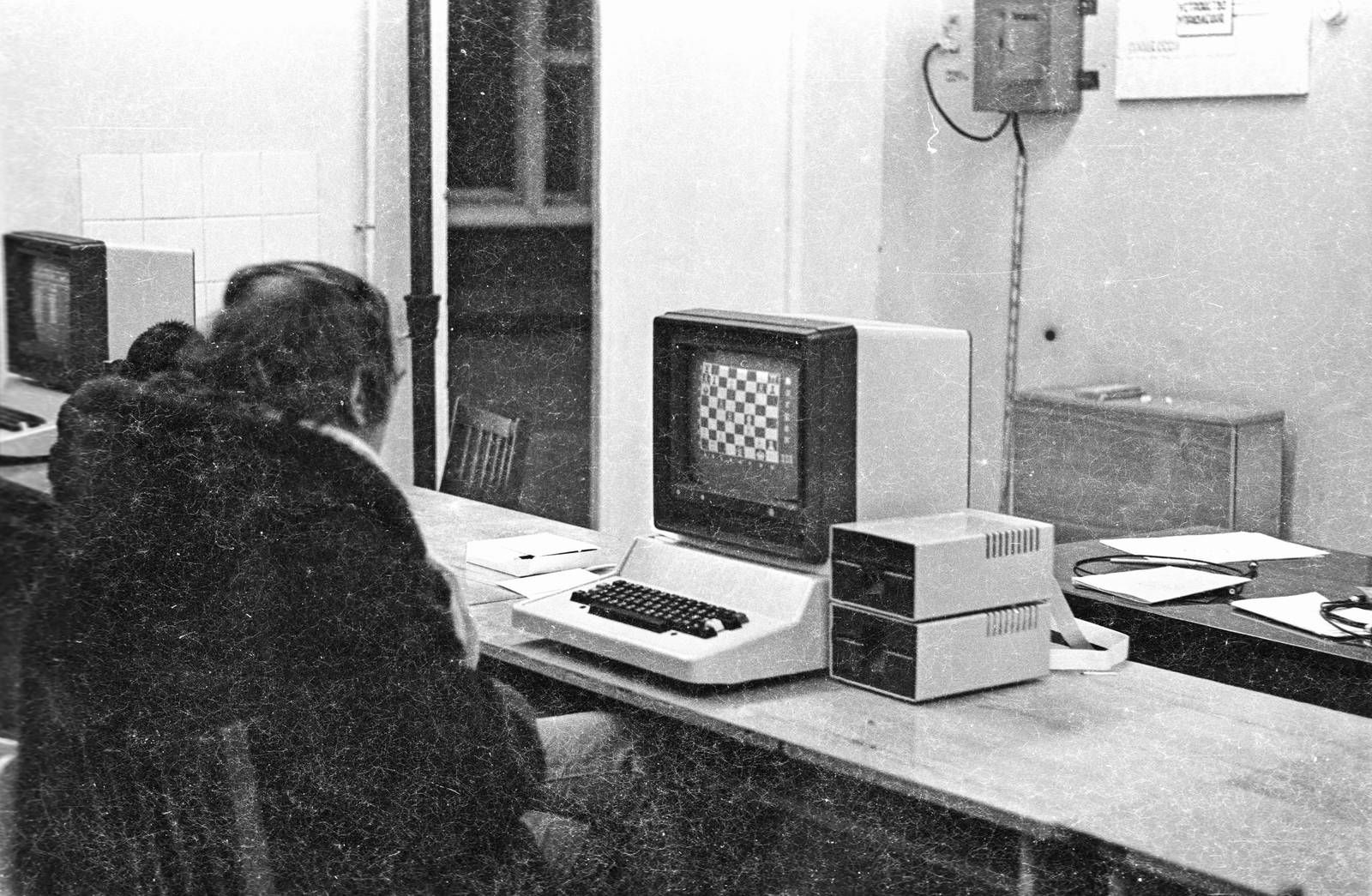
A Bulgarian-made Pravetz computer

In 1985 the computer industry of Bulgaria exported computer hardware to over 20 countries, manufacturing personal computers, word processing terminals and memory tapes and disks. At its peak, the country provided 40% of computers in the Comecon area.

After the collapse of Comecon in 1989, the computer hardware sector in its former member countries could not compete with foreign manufacturers, and virtually disappeared. Tens of thousands of IT scientists and engineers migrated to Western Europe for employment, not always in fields related to their expertise.

== Unified System project ==
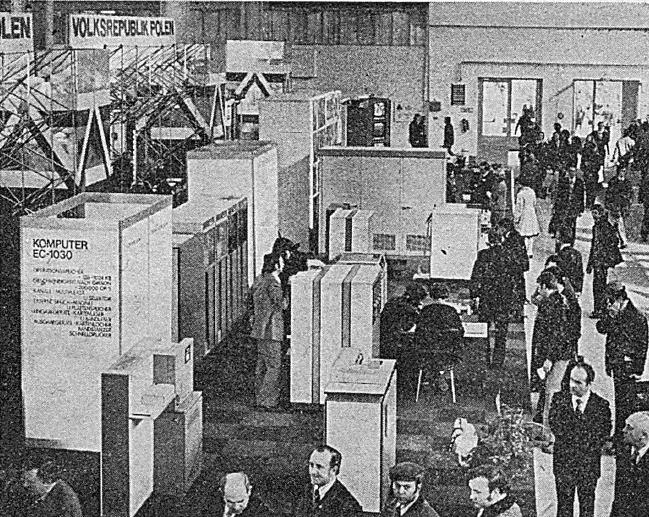
ES 1030 at the Leipziger Messe, 1975

ES EVM (ЕС ЭВМ, Единая система электронных вычислительных машин, meaning "Unified System of Electronic Computers") was a series of clones of IBM's System/360 and System/370 mainframes. The objective of the project, which was also known as Ryad ('series'), was to create a general purpose computer for the Soviet Union and Eastern Europe. Initially announced as a Soviet venture in 1967, in 1969 it became an international project, involving Bulgaria, Czechoslovakia, East Germany, Hungary and Poland. Romania and Cuba joined the project in 1973.

The first models entered serial production in 1972. According to CIA sources, by 1975 the Comecon countries had managed to build only 10% to 15% of the anticipated number of ES computers. Production continued until 1995. The total number of ES EVM mainframes produced was more than 15,000.

In the period from 1986 to 1997, a series of PC-compatible desktop computers, called ПЭВМ ЕС ЭВМ (Personal Computers of ES EVM series), was also produced; the newer versions of these computers are still produced under a different name on a very limited scale in Minsk.

== Small Machines System project ==
SM EVM (СМ ЭВМ, Система Малых ЭВМ, meaning "System of Small Electronic Computers") was an intergovernmental program for creating minicomputers, run by the Ministry of Instrument Making. The program initially included two major architectural lines based on DEC PDP-11 architecture and HP 2100 architecture. Later the program included a family of DEC VAX compatible computers and Multibus based microcomputers. Minicomputers developed within the framework of the program were intended for use as computer based control systems, measuring and computing systems and workstations for CAD systems. As in the case of ES EVM, the program began as a Soviet venture and in 1974 became an international project involving Bulgaria, Czechoslovakia, Cuba, East Germany, Hungary, Poland and Romania.

== TPA ==
TPA (Tárolt Programú Analizátor, meaning "Stored-Program Analyser") was a Hungarian product line of computers. It could not be referred as a computer, though, as computers were meant to be produced by the Soviet Union. The project started based on the freely available manuals of DEC PDP-8 in 1966 and products made available in 1968. TPAs were 100% software compatible with their original counterparts. The project remained highly popular for about 25 years. PDP-11 compatible TPAs appeared in 1976, VAX-11 compatibles in 1983.

Due to CoCom restrictions 32 bit computers could not be exported to the Eastern Bloc. In practice 32-bit DEC computers and processors were available. Those were rebranded as TPA.

== See also ==
- History of computer hardware in Bulgaria
- History of computing in Poland
- History of computing in Romania
- History of computing in the Soviet Union
- History of computer hardware in Yugoslavia
