= ICE Felix =

- Type: State enterprise
- Industry: Information technology
- Founded: 1970
- Headquarters: Bucharest, Romania
- Products: Computers, electronic systems

ICE Felix (Fabrica de Calculatoare Electronice FELIX, "FELIX Electronic Computer Factory") is a Romanian computer manufacturer based in Bucharest, founded in 1970. Over several decades, the company was the central computer manufacturer of Romania, producing a range of computer families spanning mainframes, minicomputers, microcomputers, home computers, and IBM PC-compatible systems—a breadth of production unusual among Eastern Bloc computer manufacturers. By the 1980s, Romania was the second-largest producer of electronic computing systems in the Eastern Bloc after the Soviet Union.

== History ==
=== Founding and license manufacturing ===
ICE Felix was founded in 1970 to manufacture electronic systems based on imported licenses. In its founding year, the company acquired licenses from the Dutch firm Friden and the French Compagnie internationale pour l'informatique (CII). It also maintained long-term cooperation agreements with American companies including Ampex, Pertec, Data Products, and Centronics.

=== Romania's independent path ===
Unlike the other Comecon states, Romania under Nicolae Ceaușescu pursued a largely independent technology policy. Cooperation with the other Comecon countries in computing remained limited. Romania joined the Unified System (ESER) in 1973, but continued to develop its own computer family at ICE Felix in parallel, based on Western licenses rather than the IBM System/360 architecture that underpinned the ESER programme. The Felix C mainframes were architecturally derived from the French IRIS computers of the CII, which in turn were based on the American SDS Sigma 7.

=== Expansion ===
From the mid-1970s, ICE Felix began manufacturing mini- and microcomputers. The Felix MC, a microcomputer based on the Intel 8008 developed in 1974 at the Politehnica University of Bucharest, was among the earliest microcomputers in the Eastern Bloc. The CORAL minicomputer series was based on the PDP-11 architecture.

From the mid-1980s, home computers of the HC series were added, based on the ZX Spectrum and produced for approximately ten years. ICE Felix also manufactured IBM PC-compatible systems (Felix PC) and the CoBra, another ZX Spectrum-compatible home computer.

=== After 1989 ===
After the fall of the Iron Curtain, ICE Felix established partnerships with international companies including IBM, Advantech, Sun Microsystems, DEC, Logitech, and Hewlett-Packard. Like the rest of the Eastern European computer industry, however, ICE Felix was unable to compete with Western manufacturers.

In March 2008, the company sold several plots of land and buildings in the Pipera district of Bucharest for 6 million euros. The company was 45.68% owned by the Authority for State Asset Recovery (AVAS), 23.58% by Felix IT, and 12.23% by the investment fund SIF Oltenia. In 2004, ICE Felix employed approximately 200 people; revenue in 2006 was approximately 3.1 million lei.

== Products ==
Computer family	Type	Period	Architecture/basis
Felix C	Mainframe	from early 1970s	CII IRIS / SDS Sigma 7
Felix MC	Microcomputer	from 1974	Intel 8008
Felix FC	Invoicing/accounting computer		
Felix M	Microcomputer		
CORAL	Minicomputer		PDP-11 architecture
HC series	Home computer	c. 1985–1994	ZX Spectrum-compatible
CoBra	Home computer		ZX Spectrum-compatible
CUB / CUB-Z	Office computer		Intel 8080 / Z80
Felix PC	Personal computer	from 1985	IBM PC-compatible
PC series	Personal computer	from late 1980s	x286, x386, Pentium

== See also ==
- Unified System of Electronic Computers – the mainframe programme of the socialist states
- Kombinat Robotron – the central computer manufacturer of the GDR
- Pravetz – the main computer brand of Bulgaria
- History of computing in Romania
