= Tănăsescu =

Tănăsescu is a Romanian surname that may refer to:

- Florin-Teodor Tănăsescu (born 1932), Romanian electrical engineer
- Ion Tănăsescu (chemist) (1892–1959)
- Ion Tănăsescu (surgeon) (1875–1954)
- Mihai Tănăsescu (born 1956)
- Tudor Tănăsescu (1901–1961)
