= HC (computer) =

Romanian home computer

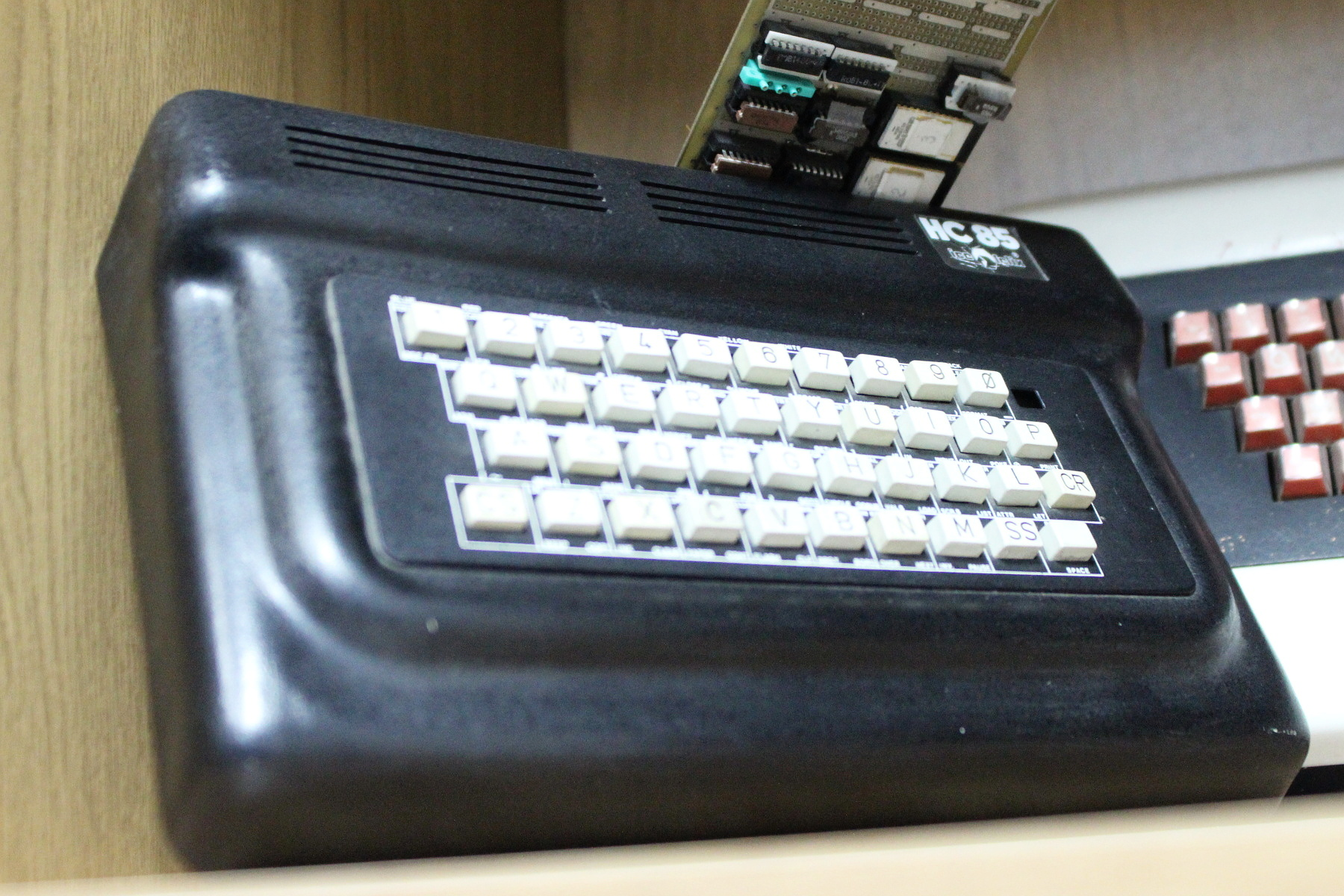
- HC 85
- Manufacturer: ICE Felix
- Type: Home computer
- Released: 1985
- Discontinued: 1994
- Operating system: BASIC, CP/M (HC 88 and later)
- CPU: Z80A at 3.5 MHz (or Romanian clone MMN80CPU)
- Memory: 64 KB RAM
- Related: ZX Spectrum

The HC (Home Computer) is a series of Romanian home computers manufactured by ICE Felix in Bucharest from 1985 to 1994. The computers were based on the Z80 processor or its Romanian clone, the MMN80CPU, and derived from the ZX Spectrum. The series comprised five main variants with several sub-variants.

The HC was one of numerous ZX Spectrum clones produced across the Eastern Bloc, where CoCom restrictions limited access to Western home computers. The ZX Spectrum's relatively simple design made it a common starting point for indigenous production. The HC 85 design proved influential within Romania: it inspired derivative systems at other institutions, including the CIP (Întreprinderea „Electronica”, also in Bucharest) PRAE (Cluj-Napoca), CoBra (Brașov), and TIM-S (Timișoara). The affordable price and software compatibility with the large existing Spectrum library made the HC series widely used in education and among hobbyists.

== HC 85 ==
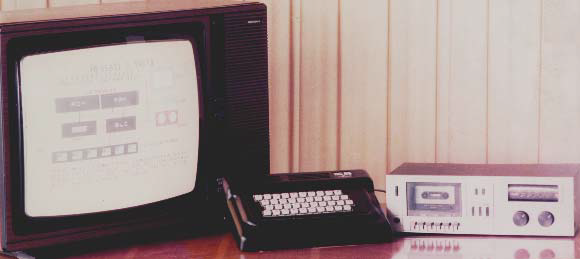
HC 85 v.0.1

The HC 85 was developed in 1985 as a laboratory model by Adrian Petrescu and Francisc Iacob at the Politehnica University of Bucharest (Computer Science Department). It was subsequently redesigned for mass production at ICE Felix by E. Dobrovie and S. Anghel.

The platform uses a Z80 microprocessor running at 3.5 MHz, with 16 KB of ROM and 64 KB of RAM. Early cases were metal; later models used a plastic enclosure (34 × 25 × 4 cm) with 40 keys plus a reset button.

The HC 85 ran BASIC stored in ROM. Display devices could include television sets or computer monitors (CRT, LCD, or plasma). Text mode offered 32 columns by 24 rows; graphics mode provided 256 × 192 pixels in 8 colours (each in normal and bright variants, effectively 16). A built-in speaker produced sound across 10 octaves. Ports were provided for TV, monitor, cassette recorder, joystick, and expansion.

The HC 85 inspired several derivative designs at other Romanian institutions, including the PRAE (Cluj-Napoca), CoBra (Brașov), and TIM-S (Timișoara).

== HC 85+ ==
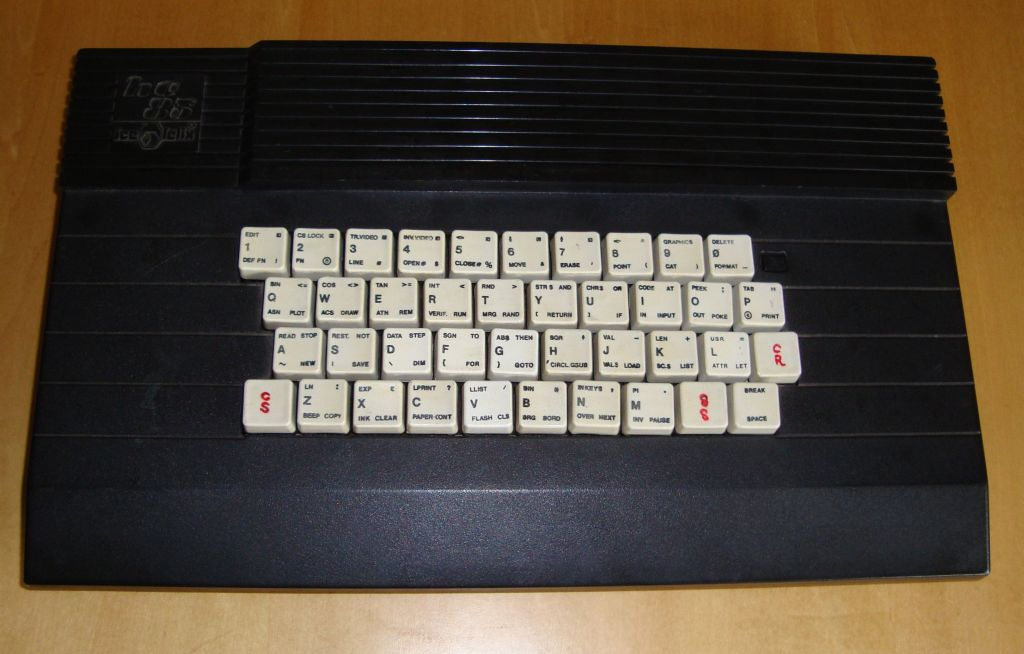
HC 85+ – nearly identical to the HC 85 ...

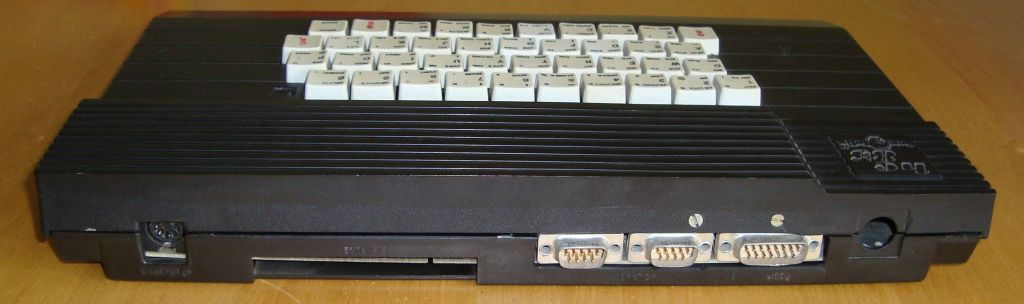
... except for the rear connectors

The HC 85+ (also HC 85 extincts, "extended") added three interfaces to the HC 85 via a supplementary board connected to the expansion port:

- connection for one or two 5¼-inch floppy disk drives (320 KB, up to 128 files);
- a serial RS-232/CCITT V.24 interface for printers or connecting two HC computers;
- a networking interface allowing up to 63 HC units to be connected via twisted pair cables—primarily intended for educational use.

The BASIC interpreter was extended with corresponding commands for these features.

== HC 88 ==
The HC 88 was designed in 1989 at ICE Felix by Ing. T. Mihu, Ing. E. Dobrovie, and Ing. V. Cososchi. It featured a dedicated enclosure with 86 keys in three categories: standard (white), extended (grey), and function keys (red).

The HC 88's distinguishing feature was dual compatibility: it could operate both as a BASIC machine (Spectrum-compatible) and as a CP/M system, replacing the CUB-Z as the standard CP/M workstation.

== HC 90 and HC 91 ==
The HC 90 and HC 91 succeeded the HC 85 and were compatible with its software.

The HC 91 (1991) ran a Z80A at 3.5 MHz, available in 40- or 50-key variants. With 16 KB ROM and 64 KB RAM, its specifications essentially matched the HC 85: 256 × 192 pixels in 16 colours, speaker with 10-octave range. Dimensions: 34 × 25 × 4 cm. An optional Interface 1 expansion provided CP/M support and floppy disk access.

The HC 91+ (also HC-128) was an improved variant produced in 1994 with the Z80 running at 4 MHz and 128 KB RAM. It ran both 48K and 128K variants of Spectrum BASIC. An AY-8910 sound chip was available as a factory-installed option.

== HC 2000 ==
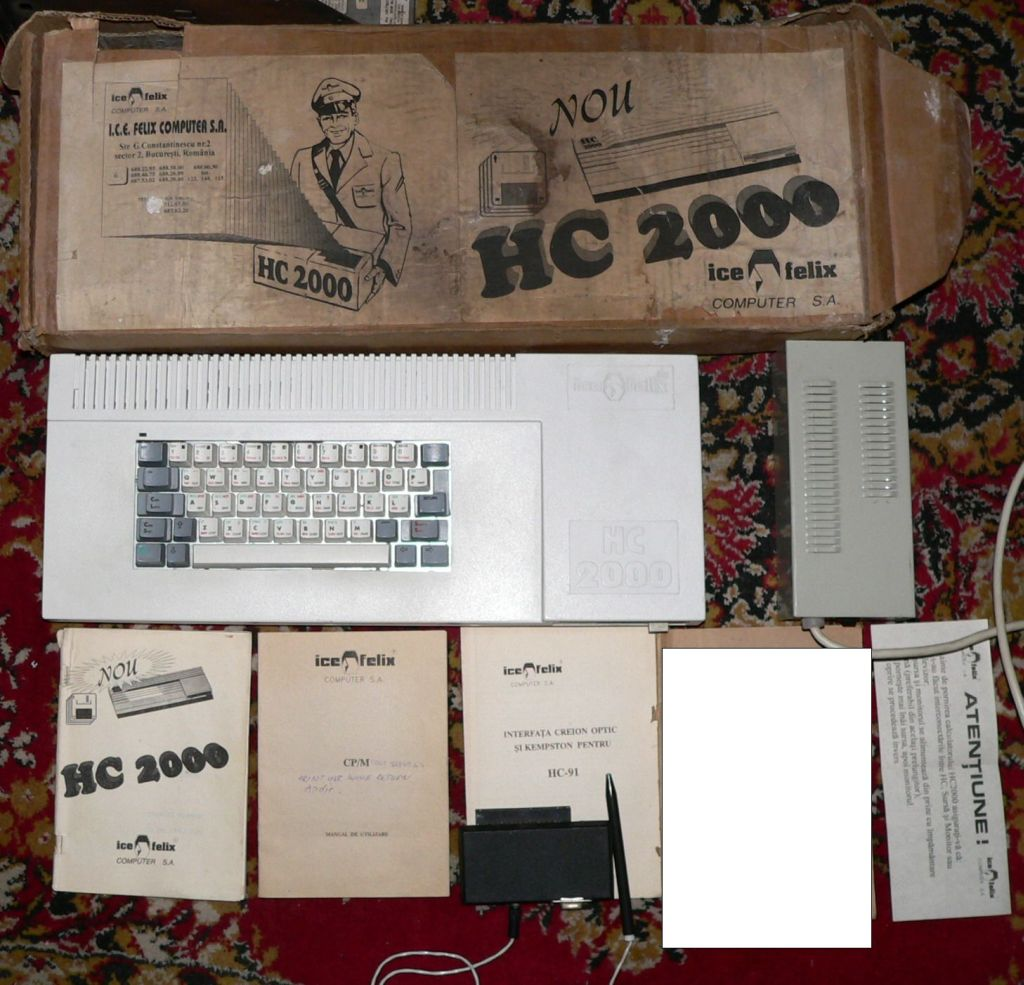
HC 2000

The HC 2000 (1992–1994) was the final model in the series before being superseded by PC-compatible systems. It retained the Z80A at 3.5 MHz but featured 64 KB RAM and 64 KB ROM.

Compared to its predecessors, it offered a larger white enclosure (50 × 20 × 6 cm) with a built-in 3½-inch floppy disk slot. The HC 2000 could operate in either Spectrum BASIC or CP/M mode.

== Software ==
Beyond the built-in BASIC interpreter, a range of software was available for the HC series, including interpreters and compilers for LOGO, Forth, Fortran, Pascal, and C, as well as word processors, databases, spreadsheets, and games. In CP/M mode (HC 88 and later), the system could run CP/M 2.2 applications.

== Bibliography ==
- A. Petrescu, N. Țăpuș, T. Moisa, Gh. Rizescu, V. Harabor, M. Marșanu, T. Mihu, abc de calculatoare personale și …nu doar atât, Editura Tehnică, Bucharest, 1990.

== See also ==
- History of computing in Romania
- ZX Spectrum
- List of ZX Spectrum clones
