= ES PEVM =

Soviet copy of IBM PC

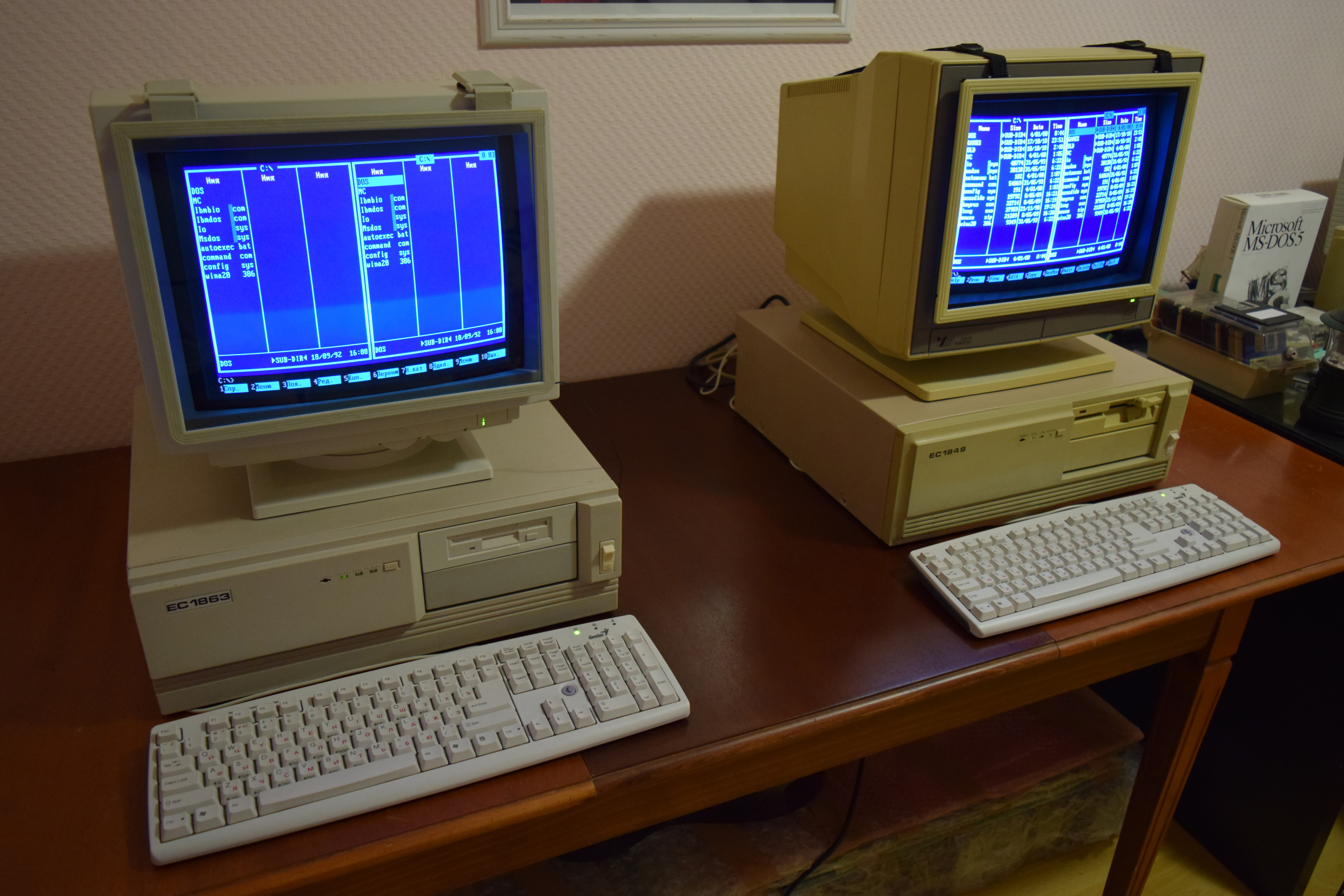
- An ЕS-1863 and ЕS-1849
- Developer: Scientific Research Institute of Electronic Computer Machines
- Manufacturer: Minsk Production Group for Computing Machinery
- Type: Personal computer
- Released: 1986; 40 years ago
- Lifespan: 1997
- Units sold: 129.579+
- Operating system: AlphaDOS
- Related: IBM Personal Computer

ES PEVM (ЕС ПЭВМ) was a Soviet clone of the IBM PC in the 1980s. The ES PEVM models lineup also included analogues of IBM PC XT, IBM PC AT, IBM XT/370.

The computers and software were adapted in Minsk, Belarus, at the Scientific Research Institute of Electronic Computer Machines (NII EVM).

They were manufactured in Minsk as well, at Minsk Production Group for Computing Machinery (Минское производственное объединение вычислительной техники (МПО ВТ)).

== Description ==
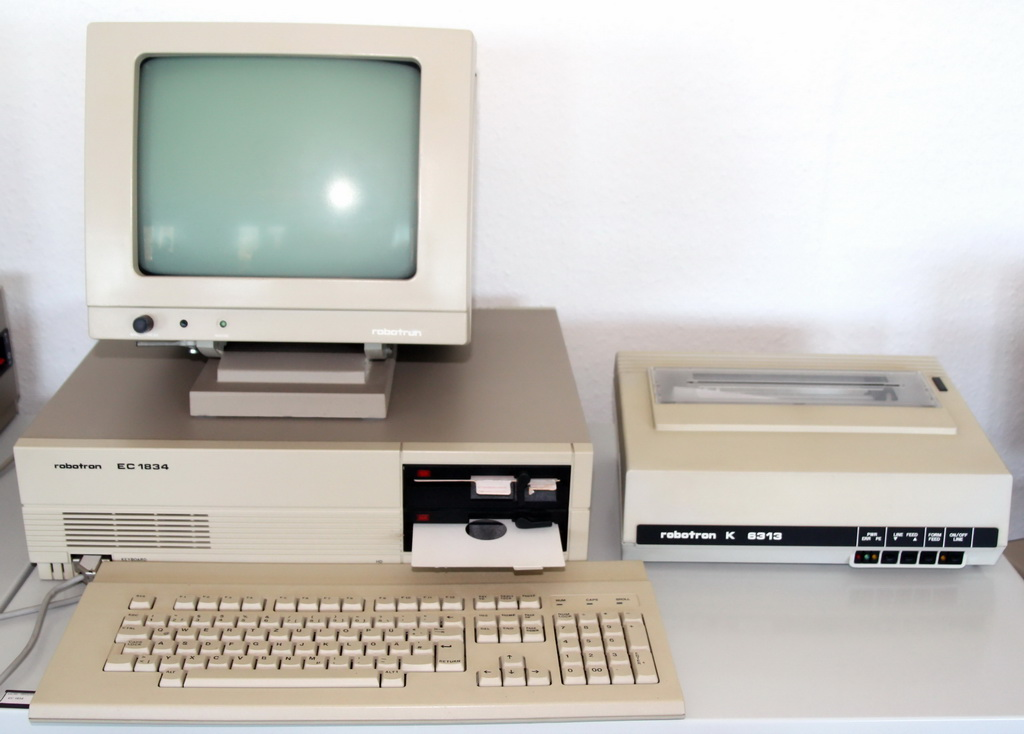
EC-1834 with monitor K-7229.25 and printer K-6313

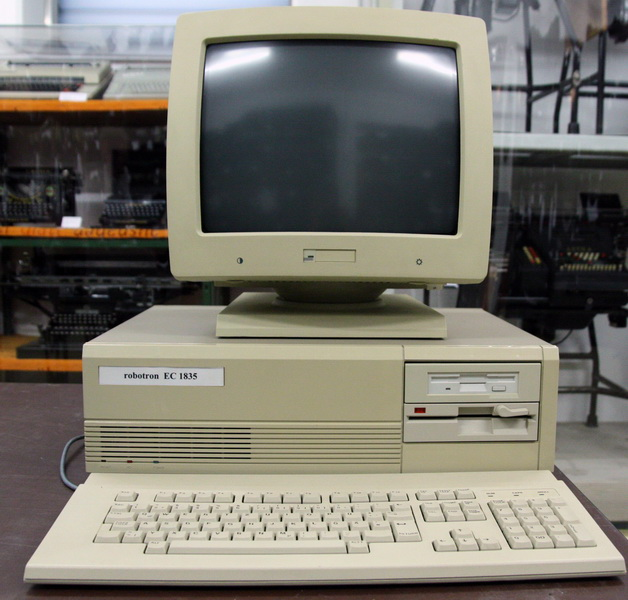
ES-1835

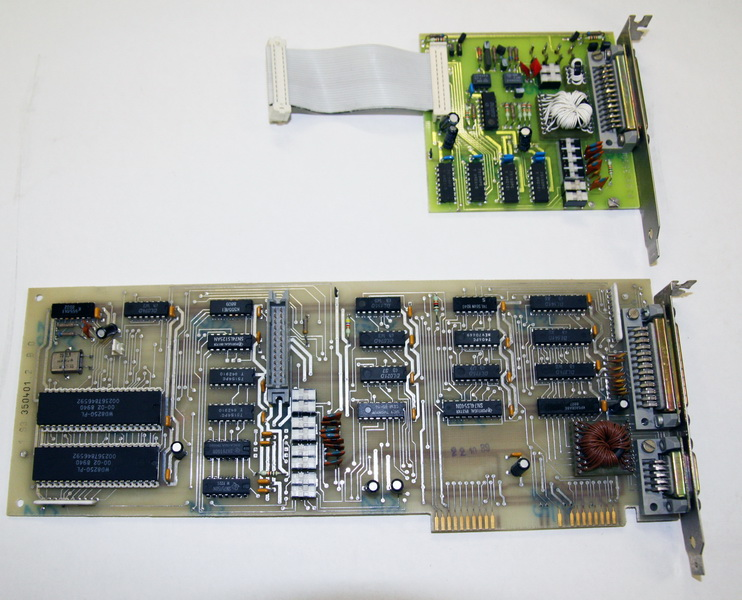
EC-1835 I/O adapter

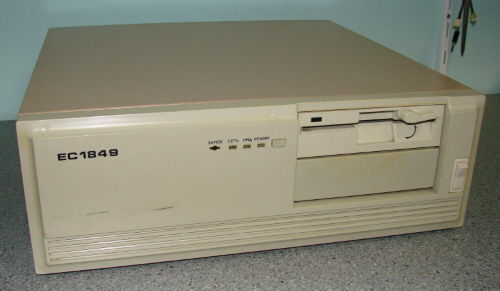
ES-1849

The first models of ES PEVM (ES-1840, ES-1841, ES-1842), unlike the IBM PC, had two units: a system unit and a floppy drives unit. These models used a backplane instead of the main board. Although the system bus was compatible with ISA bus, it used a different type of connector, so the IBM PC expansion cards could not be installed in ES PEVM. Later models (ES-1843, ES-1849 etc.) were fully-compatible with IBM PC XT and IBM PC AT.

Unlike IBM PC using the Intel 8088 processor, the early ES PEVM models used K1810VM86 processor with a 16-bit bus and a clock frequency of 5 MHz. The processor was placed on a separate board. Early versions of the board did not have a socket for the floating point coprocessor.

The following boards were produced for ES-1840 and ES-1841:

- CPU board (containing 54 chips). It was installed in every configuration of the computer.
- 128 KiB RAM board. It was installed in early models of ES PEVM.
- 512 KiB RAM board (containing 110 chips). Variants with 256 KiB or 128 Kib were available.
- MDA adapter board (containing 91 chips). It was built using the Bulgarian CM607 chip (MC6845 clone).
- CGA adapter board (containing 94 chips).
- Floppy drive adapter board (containing 32 chips). It was built using the Bulgarian CM609 chip (Intel 8272 clone).
- Serial interface adapter board (containing 56 chips). It was electrically incompatible with the IBM PC COM port and was not supported in the BIOS.

Volume of production for a number of models:

Model name	Year of production start	Year of production end	Volume of production (units)
ES-1831	1986		?
ES-1832	1986		?
ES-1834	1986	1989	13799
ES-1835	1989		?
ES-1838	1988		?
ES-1839	1987		?
ES-1840	1986	1989	7461
ES-1841	1987	1995	83937
ES-1842	1988	1996	10193
ES-1843	1990	1993	3012
ES-1845	1988		?
ES-1847	1988		?
ES-1849	1990	1997	4966
ES-1850	1989		?
ES-1851	1991	1997	3142
ES-1855	1991		?
ES-1861			?
ES-1862			?
ES-1863	1991	1997	3069
ES-1864	1991		?
ES-1865	1992		?

== Software ==
The computers were shipped with AlphaDOS, an entirely Russified version of MS-DOS/PC DOS 2.x and 3.x. All commands were entered in Russian, for example, СМЕНКАТ for CHDIR. Files and file extensions were also in Russian, such as АТРИБ.ИСП for ATTRIB.EXE. The operating system used the main code page, hardwired into the display ROM; it was compatible neither with CP 866 nor CP 855, although partially with ISO/IEC 8859-5.

== Reliability ==
Early models of ES PEVM were prone to failures due to manufacturing defects. The mean time between failures was around 350 hours.

== See also ==
- History of computer hardware in Eastern Bloc countries
- ES EVM
