= CIFA =

The acronym CIFA may stand for:

- Central Institute of Freshwater Aquaculture
- Cayman Islands Football Association
- Chartered Institute for Archaeologists, a professional organization
- Cook Islands Football Association
- Counterintelligence Field Activity
- CIFA (computer) (Calculatorul Institutului de Fizică Atomică (Atomic Physics Institute Computer), an early Romanian computer
