= Grigore Moisil National College =

Grigore Moisil National College (Romanian: Colegiul Național "Grigore Moisil") may refer to one of four educational institutions in Romania:

- Grigore Moisil National College of Computer Science (Brașov)
- Grigore Moisil National College (Bucharest)
- Grigore Moisil National College (Onești)
- Grigore Moisil National College (Urziceni)

Grigore Moisil High School (Romanian: Liceul Teoretic "Grigore Moisil") may refer to one of three educational institutions in Romania:

- Grigore Moisil High School (Bucharest)
- Grigore Moisil High School (Timișoara)
- Grigore Moisil High School (Tulcea)
