= MECIPT =

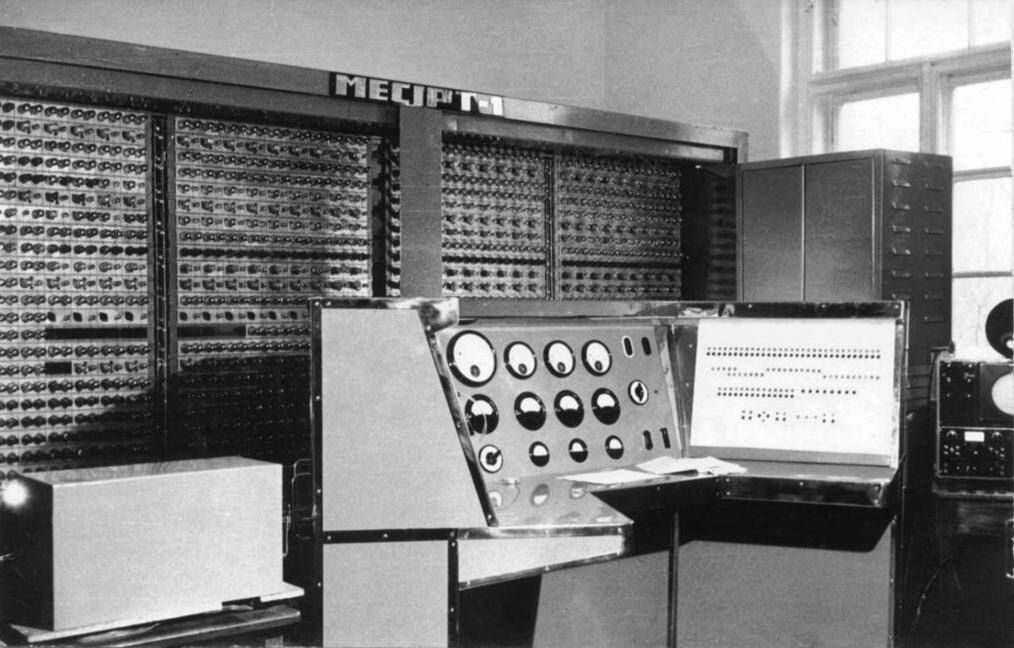
MECIPT-1

The Timişoara Polytechnic Institute Electronic Computer (Romanian: Mașina Electronică de Calcul Institutul Politehnic Timişoara), known as MECIPT, is the name used for a family of computers built from 1961 to 1968 at the Polytechnic University of Timișoara in Romania.

MECIPT-1 was a first generation computer built by Iosif Kaufmann and Wilhelm Lowenfeld (1956–1962), a team joined in 1961 by Vasile Baltac. This was the second computer built in Romania after Victor Toma built the CIFA-1 in 1957, and the first in a Romanian university. MECIPT-2 (1962) and MECIPT-3 (1965) followed as second and third generation computer technology.

Parts of MECIPT 1 and 2 were exhibited in the Museum of Banat. and are now in the UPT Museum In 2011, a 50th anniversary celebration was organized in Timişoara to recall the importance of the MECIPT computers to Romania.
