= History of computer hardware in Bulgaria =

This article describes the history of computer hardware in Bulgaria. At its peak, Bulgaria supplied 40% of the computers in the socialist economic union COMECON. The electronics industry employed 300,000 workers, and it generated 8 billion rubles a year. Since the democratic changes in 1989 and the subsequent chaotic political and economic conditions, the once blooming Bulgarian computer industry almost completely disintegrated.

== Computer models ==
In the 1980s, Bulgaria manufactured computers according to an agreement within the COMECON:

=== Mainframes ===
IZOT series and ES EVM series (abbreviation from Edinnaya Sistema Elektronno Vichislitelnih Mashin, or Unified Computer System — created in 1969 by USSR, Bulgaria, Hungary, GDR, Poland and Czechoslovakia).

=== Personal computers ===
- IMKO, Pravetz-82/8M/8A/8E/8C — an 8-bit machine (Apple II clones), based on Bulgarian-made 6502 variants, Pravetz-16/16A/16H/286 (16-bit) — IBM PC clones based on i8088(V20)/286.
- IZOT 1030 — based on East German-made U880 (a Z80A clone), IZOT 1036C - IBM PC compatible based on i8086, IZOT 1037C - IBM PC/XT clone based on i8088.

For example, the Pravetz-8M featured two processors (primary: Bulgarian-made clone of 6502, designated SM630 at 1.018 MHz, secondary: Z80A at 4 MHz), 64 KB DRAM and 16 KB EPROM.

== Production facilities ==
The largest computer factory was some 60 km (37 mi) from Sofia, in Pravetz. Another big facility was the plant "Electronika" in Sofia. Smaller plants throughout the country produced monitors and peripherals, notably DZU (Diskovi Zapametyavashti Ustroistva — Disk Memory Devices) — Stara Zagora made hard disks for mainframes and personal computers.

== See also ==
- History of computer hardware in Yugoslavia
- Computer systems in the Soviet Union
- History of computing in Romania
- History of computing in Poland
