= Electronics industry in the Socialist Republic of Romania =

The electronics industry in the Socialist Republic of Romania was characterized by stronger ties to Western Europe when compared to other countries in the Eastern Bloc, due to the drive of the Romanian leadership towards greater autonomy from the Soviet Union.

== History ==
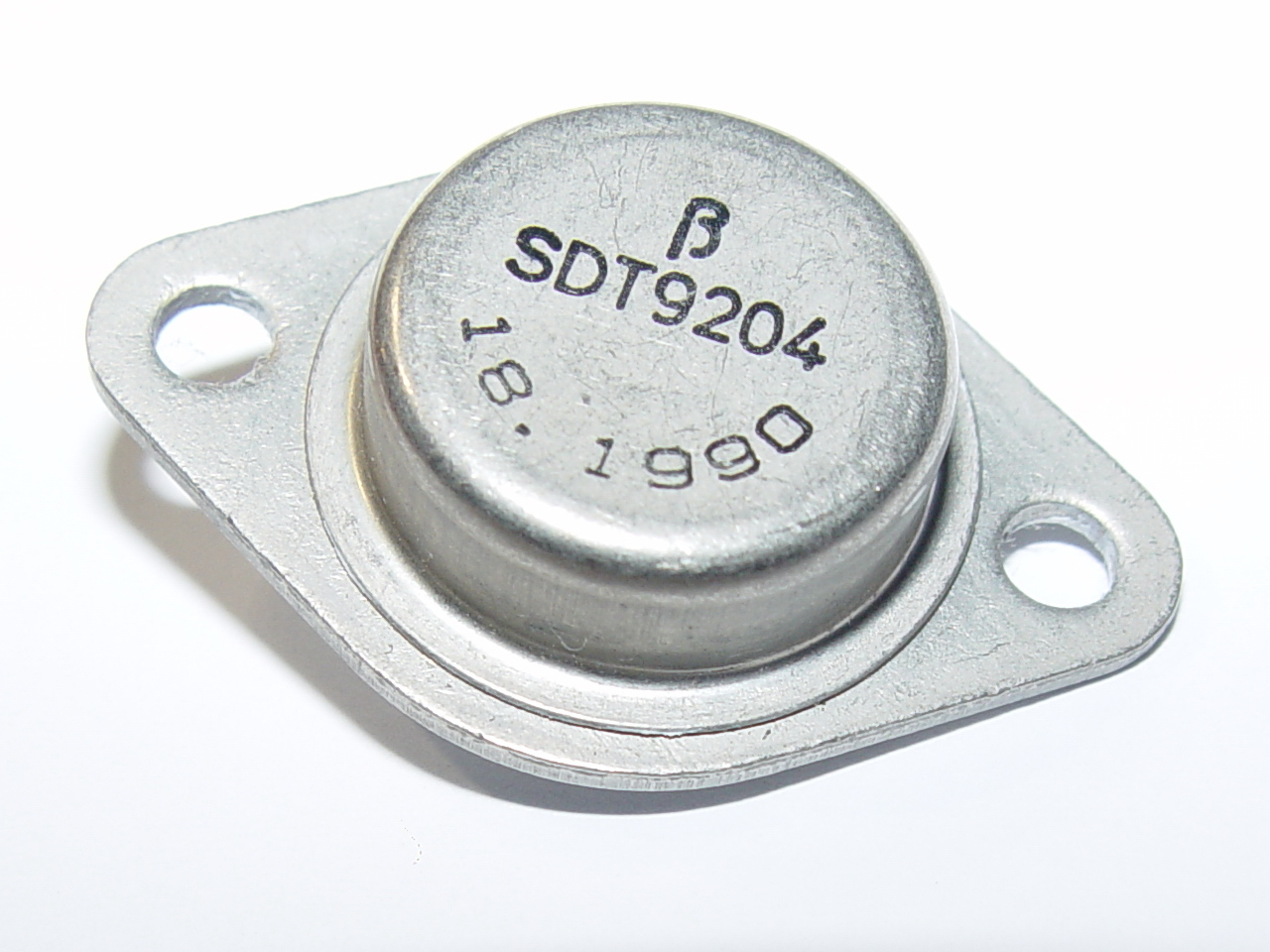
Silicon power transistor SDT9402, showing the "β" logo of I.P.R.S.

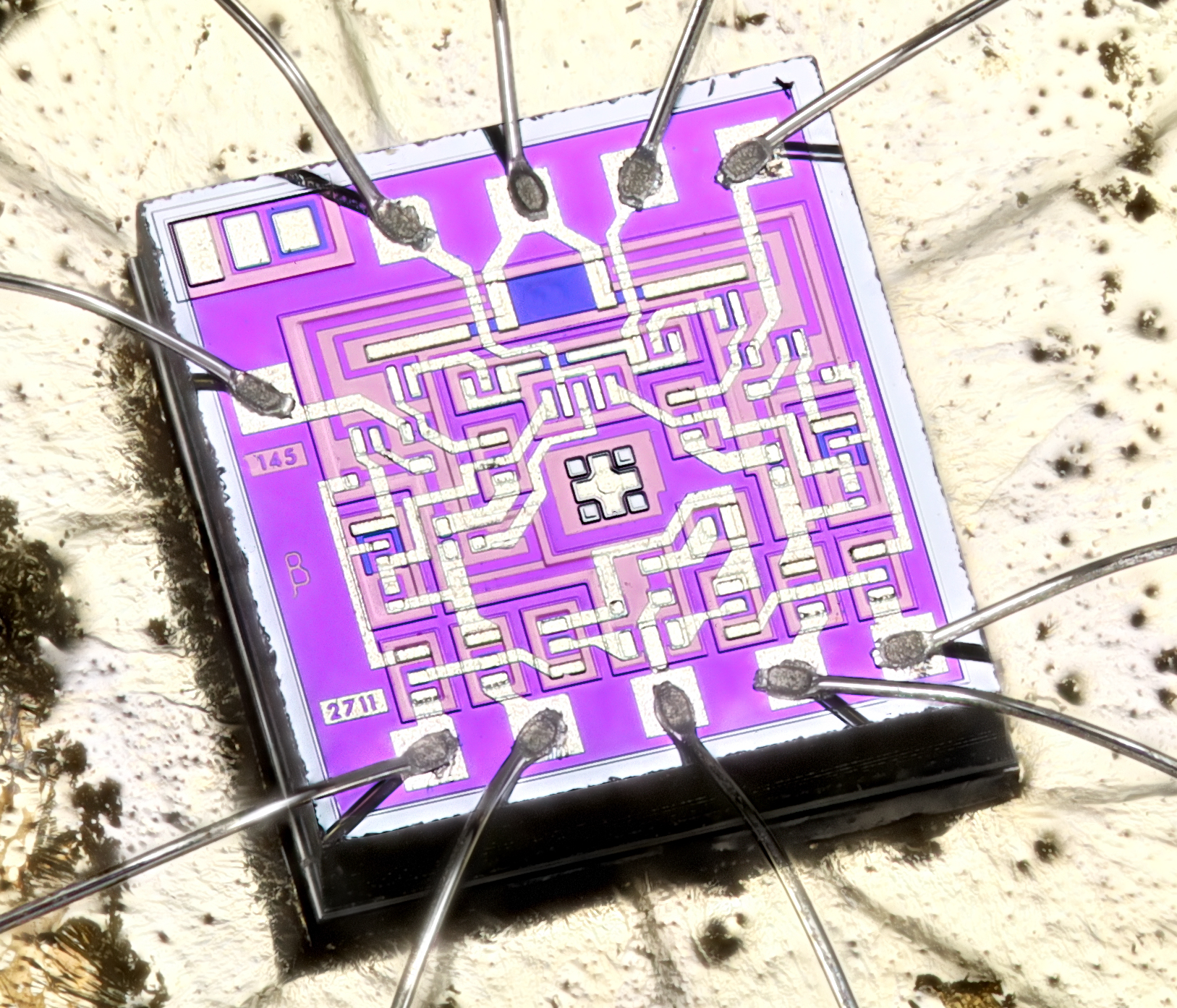
CII 72 die, two voltage comparators with separate differential inputs, showing the "β" logo of I.P.R.S.

In 1960, the government of Gheorghe Gheorghiu-Dej decided to build an electronics plant in the forest of Băneasa, which in 1962 was named Băneasa Radio and Semiconductor Parts Company (Romanian: Întreprinderea de piese radio și semiconductori or I.P.R.S.). The production of integrated circuits started in 1970 with technology from Thomson-CSF. The plant developed steadily and grew to 6,000 employees by the early 1980s. By 1990, the product range included bipolar digital and linear integrated circuits (including 7400 series integrated circuits), silicon transistors and diodes, microwave devices, thyristors, triacs, and capacitors. I.P.R.S. manufactured with the designation βP14500 a clone of the 1-bit-microprocessor Motorola MC14500B in I^{2}L technology.

In 1969, the Research Center for the Design of Electronic Components (Romanian: Centrul de Cercetare Proiectare pentru Componente Electronice or CCPCE) was established on the grounds of I.P.R.S., but independent from it. The research center developed semiconductor products from initial experiments to pilot production, at which point the mass manufacturing was handed over to I.P.R.S. By 1974, the center moved to a new headquarter adjacent to I.P.R.S. and changed its name to Research Institute for Electronic Components (Romanian: Institutul de Cercetare pentru Componente Electronice or ICCE). With new production facilities opened in 1979, the institute started to manufacture transistors, diodes, integrated circuits, optoelectronics, and microwave devices for end customers, in particular products that were needed only in small quantities (a few thousand per month) and could therefore not be manufactured economically at I.P.R.S.

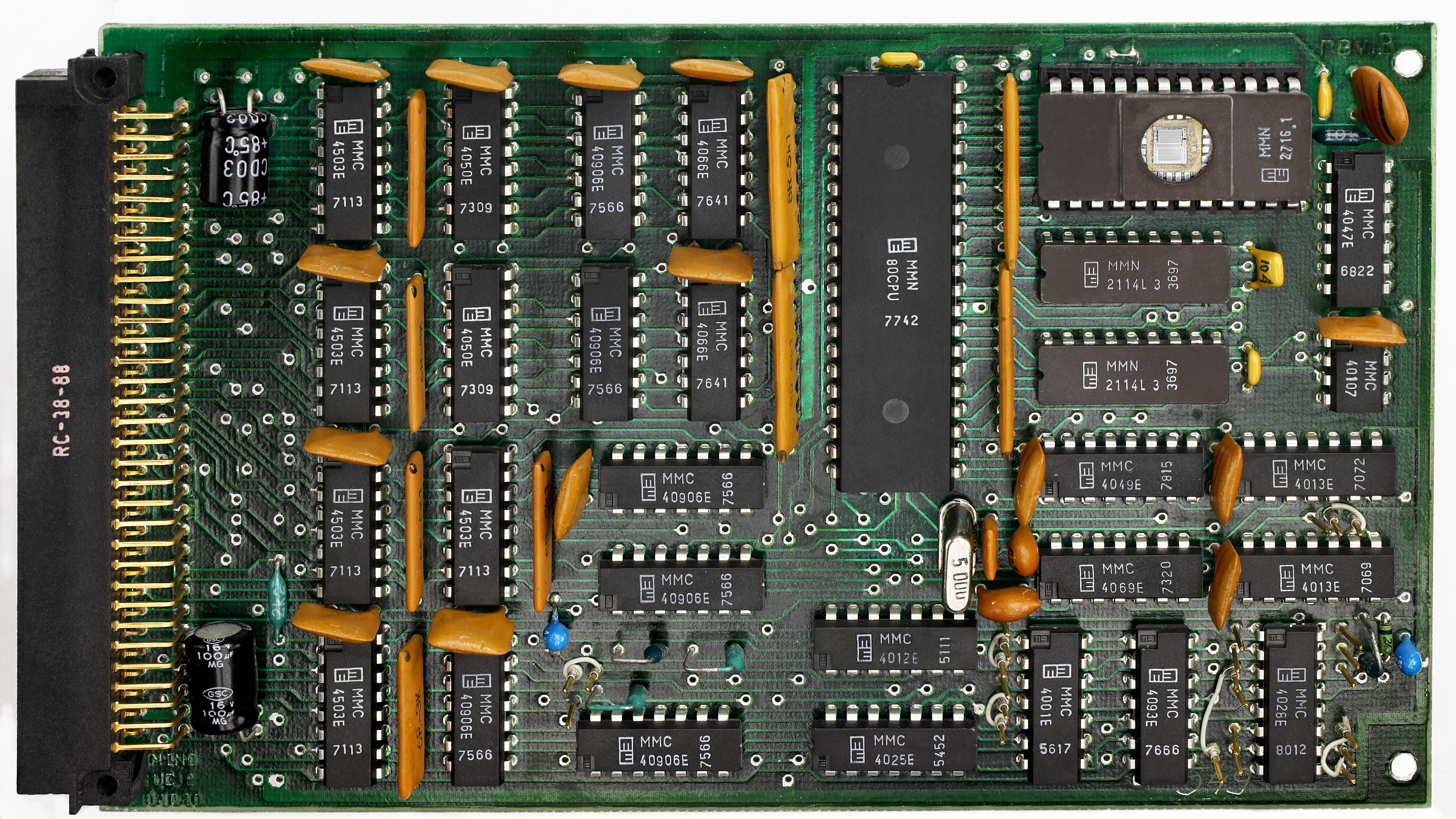
Single-height Eurocard Board with MMN80CPU microprocessor and 4000-series integrated circuits, all showing the "ME" logo of Microelectronica

A third entity, Microelectronica was set up in 1981 close to I.P.R.S. and ICCE, with the goal of manufacturing PMOS, NMOS and CMOS integrated circuits (including 4000-series integrated circuits), as well as optoelectronics, complementing the production profile of I.P.R.S. Microelectronica manufactured a clone of the Intel 8080 with the designation MMN8080 and a clone of the Zilog Z80 with the designation MMN80CPU. The MMN80CPU entered production in 1988. For comparison, the original Z80 was launched in 1976 and the East German clone U880 in 1980.

=== After 1990 ===
I.P.R.S. remained in government hands until 2003. After a factory upgrade in 1992 a steady decline set in. The number of employees dropped to 5,000 in 1991 and 2,000 at the end of the 1990s. Amid allegations of corruption, the plant was sold, in 2003, to Syrian businessman Omar Hayssam (who was, in 2013, sentenced to a 20-year prison term for organizing the kidnapping of three Romanian journalists in Baghdad). By 2008, I.P.R.S. was declared bankrupt. The equipment had been stolen or sold for scrap at that point.

ICCE was first split into four sections, but largely re-united, in 1996, as the Institute for Microtechnology (Romanian: Institut de Microtehnologii or IMT). While IMT still existed in 2020, it has lost its commercial manufacturing capabilities as well as its industry partners I.P.R.S. and Microelectronica.

Microelectronica ceased commercial operation in 1997, and many of its specialists transferred to IMT. As of 2020, Microelectronica still exists as a "technology showcase", albeit without any products and few employees.

== Semiconductor designation ==
Unlike the Soviet integrated circuit designation or the East German semiconductor designation, the Romanian government did not set standards for the labeling of semiconductors. Devices licensed from Western manufacturers were often named according to the Pro Electron standard. Microelectronica assigned integrated circuit designations according to the underlying technology: MMP for PMOS (e.g. MMP106), MMN for NMOS (e.g. MMN8080), and MMC for CMOS (e.g. MMC4001).

== See also ==
- History of computing in Romania
