= MMN80CPU =

8-bit microprocessor clone

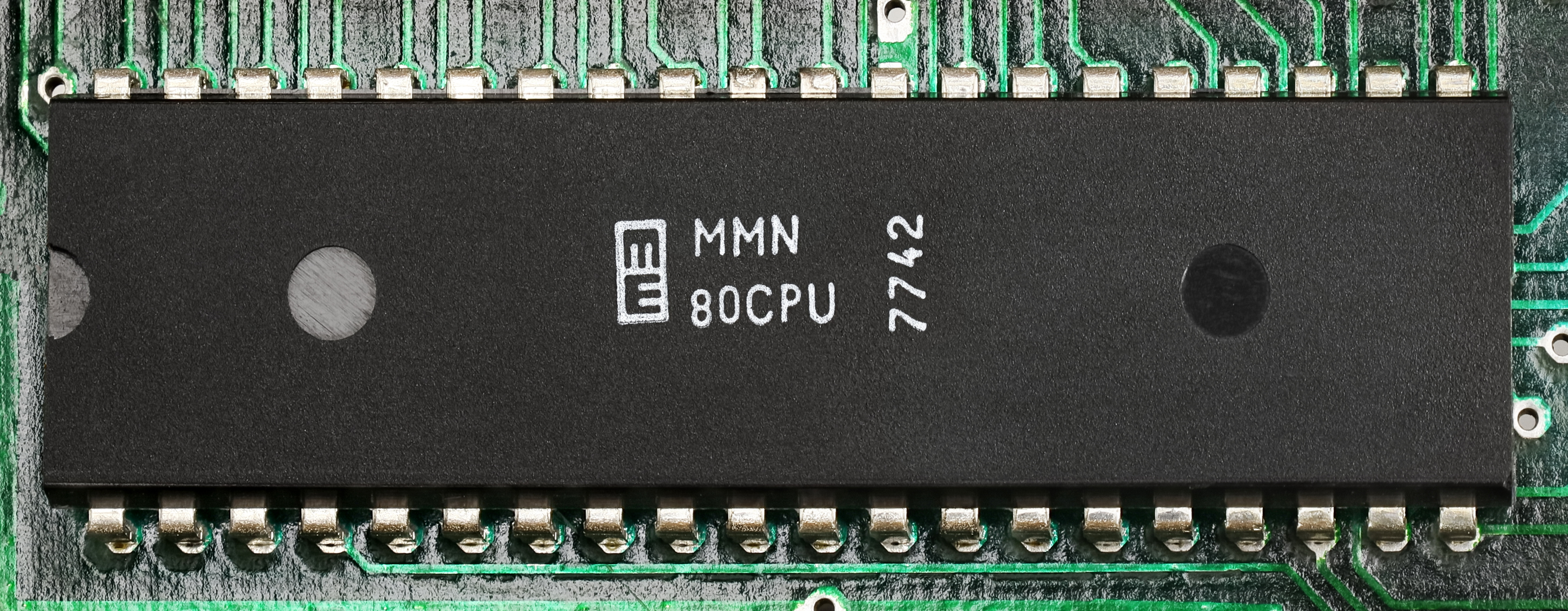
- An MMN80CPU processor.

General information
- Launched: 1988
- Common manufacturer: Microelectronica București

Performance
- Max. CPU clock rate: 2.5 MHz to 4 MHz

Physical specifications
- Cores: 1
- Socket: 40 pin DIP

Architecture and classification
- Instruction set: Z80

MMN80CPU is a Z80A microprocessor clone, working at 4 MHz. It was produced from 1988 onwards at Microelectronica Bucharest for the Romanian automation industry and 8 bit computers such as HC-91, HC-2000, Tim-S, CoBra, CIP, JET, CUB-Z, aMIC, PRAE and others. It exhibited a unique and unusual behavior: immediately after a reset, it activated the M1 line without using RD or IORQ to reset a PIO controller directly, saving a gate in industrial systems with PIOs.

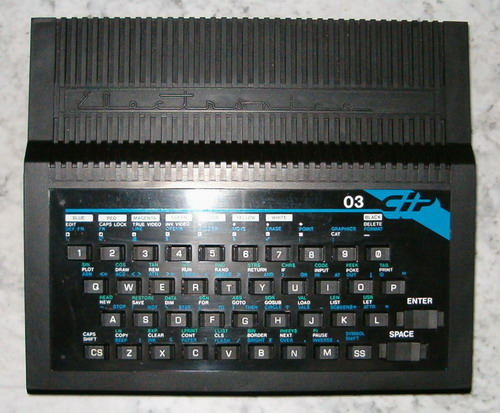
CIP-03

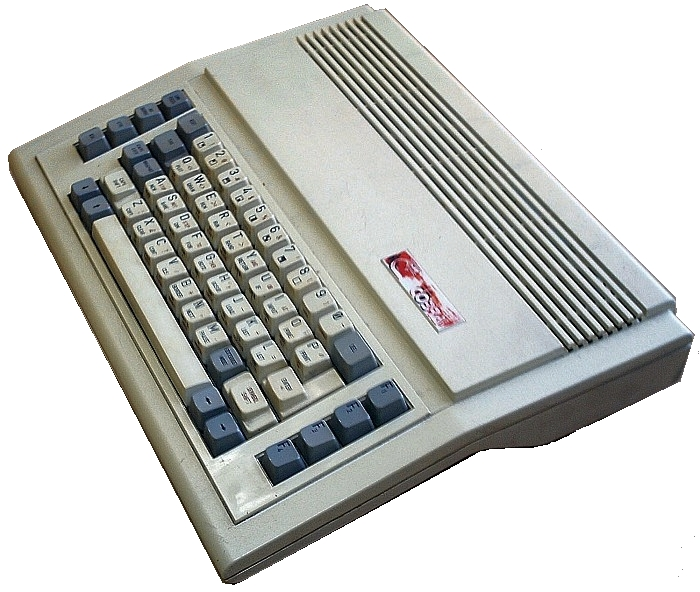
CoBra
