= CID-201 =

Digital computer from Cuba

- Developer: University of La Habana
- Manufacturer: ICID
- Product family: CID
- Type: Minicomputer
- Generation: Third-generation computer
- Released: 1970; 56 years ago
- Memory: 4K 12 bits words
- Storage: magnetic tape
- Input: switches and keys
- Successor: CID 201-A

CID 201 was a digital computer produced in Cuba in 1970.

== History ==
Cuba had already produced the analog computer SILNA 999. In 1969, the Cuban leader Fidel Castro asked during a visit to the University of Havana if Cuba could produce a digital computer. The Centro de Investigaciones Digitales (CID, "Center for Digital Researches") was formed. The project was directed by Luis Carrasco and mostly designed by Orlando Ramos. The first version was designed using transistors, but after the introduction of integrated circuits, the design was changed. It was inspired by the American 1965 PDP-8. The components were mostly Japanese, due to the American embargo on Cuba.

On 18 April 1970, the first computer was produced. It was named CID 201 following the earlier digital watch CID 101. It could do 25 000 additions/second. Its memory held 4 096 12-bit words. It was considered a third-generation computer.

It could be programmed in LEAL (Lenguaje Algorítmico, "algorithmic language").

A later version was the CID 201-A. The CID also produced the CID 201-B, CID-300/10, CID-1408 and CID-1417. Among the peripherals produced, several thousands of displays were exported to the Soviet Union.

== Application ==
The first computer was installed in the sugar refinery Camilo Cienfuegos to control the railroad traffic during the sugarcane harvest. Another one was installed in the Ecuador refinery.

== Legacy ==
- On 2010, the Cuban Administración Postal issued a stamp commemorating the CID-201.

== See also ==
- History of computer hardware in Eastern Bloc countries
