= Grigore Moisil High School (Timișoara) =

Grigore Moisil Theoretical High School
- Liceul Teoretic „Grigore Moisil”

Location
- 4 Ghirlandei Street, Timișoara
- Coordinates: 45°44′29″N 21°13′38″E

Information
- Type: Theoretical high school
- Established: 1971; 55 years ago
- Authority: Ministry of National Education
- Principal: Cerasela Bociu
- Staff: 147
- Enrollment: 1,823
- Language: Romanian

Grigore Moisil Theoretical High School is a high school in Timișoara, Romania, founded in 1971. It is named after Romanian mathematician Grigore Moisil (1906–1973). About 1,800 students study in the 58 classrooms and 10 laboratories of the high school.

== History ==
The school is on the site of what was the Boys' State Primary School no. 6 between 1863 and 1949. In 1902, the building became the property of the City Hall, with a secular board. The language of instruction was Hungarian until 1926 when the Romanian language was introduced, creating a German and a Hungarian section.

The Grigore Moisil High School was established in its current form in 1971. It was one of the first five computer science high schools in Romania, along with those in Bucharest, Cluj-Napoca, Iași and Brașov, all founded in 1971, under the name of "high schools for automatic data processing." The old buildings were demolished in 1970, and a new three-level school was built in their place according to a Swedish-inspired plan presented by architect Nicolae Dâncu; the building was completed in late 1972.

Over time, the high school was equipped with simple electronic equipment such as office computing machines. Until 1978, the high school did not have a computer to use, all the work and training of the students being done on the computer occurred at the Computer Center in the city. In 1978, the high school was equipped by transfer from the Computer Center with a Felix C256, which was used until 1984. During this period it was under the direct coordination of the Central Institute of Informatics (ICI) in Bucharest. After 1985, ICI was disbanded and the high school passed under the coordination of the Institute of Electrotechnical Research and Design (ICPE), which introduced electrical engineering classes and laboratories that functioned until 1989. From 1990 all electrical engineering classes were abolished and returned to computer science classes, and the institution became the Computer Science High School; in 1992, it was given the name of Romanian mathematician Grigore Moisil.

== Principals ==
Name	Term
Volga Slimac	1973–1984
Maria Hărăguș	1984–1990
Maria Liță	1990–1998
Silvia Popescu	1998–2006
Ana Buzărnescu	2006–2010
Ovidiu Roșu	2010–2012
Cerasela Bociu	2012–present
