= CIFA (computer) =

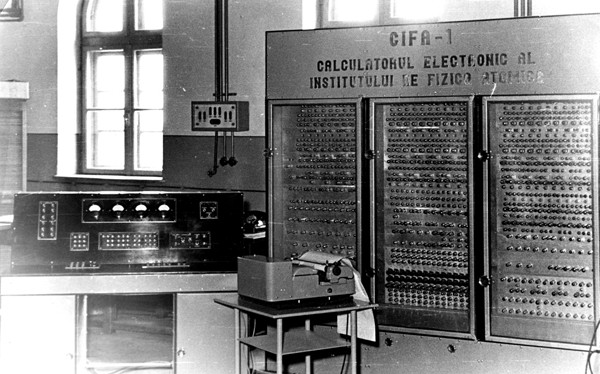
CIFA-1, the first Romanian computer

CIFA is the acronym for Calculatorul Institutului de Fizică Atomică ('Computer of Atomic Physics Institute').

CIFA-1, the first Romanian computer, was built in 1957 under the guidance of Victor Toma. The experimental first-generation model CIFA-1 was reproduced in small numbers both in the original variant with vacuum tubes as well as in two variants using transistors: CIFA-10X and CET 500.

CIFA-1 was Romanias contribution to the development of computers in socialist countries (together with the USSR, the GDR, Polish People's Republic and CSSR).

== CIFA-1 ==
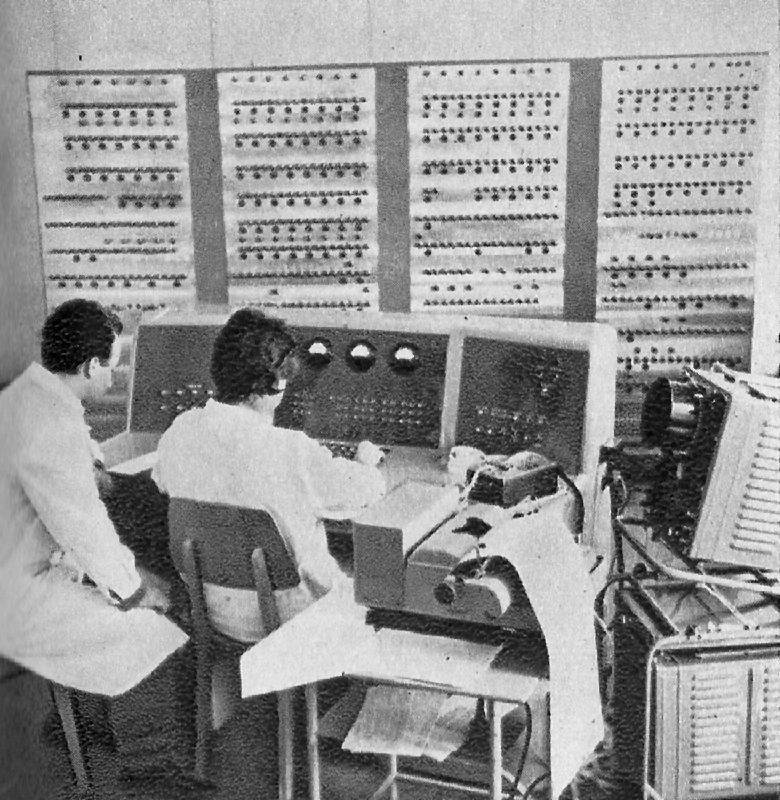
CIFA-3

The logic designs for CIFA-1 started in 1953, at the Academy Physics Institute in Măgurele, with Victor Toma as the head of the project. It was presented at the International Symposium in Dresden in 1955, and the prototype, which used 1500 vacuum tubes, a cylindrical magnet memory and machine code programming, was finished in 1957. Its size was that of three chifforobes, it had a paper tape input and a typewriter output and was able of solving 50 operations per second.

CIFA-1 was in use for two years. After it was decommissioned, it was scrapped and no part of it survived today.

== Later computers ==
Later CIFA computers were CIFA-2 (800 vacuum tubes) in 1959, CIFA-3 (for the Bucharest University's Computer Center) in 1961 and CIFA-4 in 1962. Other Romanian computers of the era are MECIPT-1 (1961), MECIPT-2 (1964) at the Polytechnic Institute of Timișoara, MARICA, DACICC-1 and DACICC-200 at the T. Popoviciu Institute of Numerical Analysis, Cluj-Napoca.

VITOSHA was the first Bulgarian computer, built in 1962-1963 on the basis of a cultural agreement between the Romanian and Bulgarian Academies of Science. It was based on CIFA-3.

== CIFA Computer Characteristics ==
Computer Model	CIFA-1	CIFA-4	CIFA-101	CIFA-102
Year	1957	1962	1962	1964
Number of computers produced	4	4	1	5
Semiconductive diodes	2500		3000	
Vacuum tubes	800		350	
Computing speed	50 op/s		50 - 2000 op/s	
Internal memory type	cylinder 50 rot/s		cylinder 50 rot/s	
Internal memory capacity	512 words × 4 bits		4 k words × 4 bits	
Peripherals	• punch card reader 15 characters/s • writer 8 characters/s		• punch card reader 15 characters/s • writer 8 characters/s	• punch card reader 100 characters/s • writer 8 characters/s
Number of instructions	16		32	
Word length	31		32	
Word processing mode	parallel		serial	
Power utilization	5 kW		1 kW	
