= Zenon Kulpa =

Polish computer scientist (born 1946)

- Born: 1946 (age 79–80)
- Education: Warsaw Technical University; Polish Academy of Sciences
- Scientific career
- Fields: Computer Science

Zenon Kulpa (born 1946) is a Polish computer scientist, and Assistant Professor at Institute of Fundamental Technological Research of Polish Academy of Sciences, known for his work on diagrammatic representation and diagrammatic reasoning.

== Biography ==
Kulpa obtained his M.Sc. in Electronics at the Electronics Faculty of the Warsaw Technical University, and his PhD in Computer Science from the Institute of Computer Science of the Polish Academy of Sciences, Warsaw, Poland.

After his studies Kulpa started working for the Institute of Automatic Control of the Polish Academy of Sciences (PAS) in the late 1960s. There he met the computer scientist Ryszard S. Michalski. With Michalski he wrote his first English articles, entitled "A System of Programs for the Synthesis of Switching Circuits Using the Method of Disjoint Stars" presented at the 1971 IFIP Congress in Ljubljana, Yugoslavia.

Later in the 1970s he focussed his work on the field of computer graphics and image processing, and in the 1990s on diagrammatic representation and reasoning. In In 2006 he obtained his D.Sc. in Computer Science from the Institute of Fundamental Technological Research, Warsaw, Poland, with the thesis "Diagrammatic interval analysis with applications." Kulpa was one of the founding members of the Polish Computer Science Society (PTI) and member of the Planetary Society.

== Selected publications ==
- Bolc, Leonard, and Zenon Kulpa, eds. Digital image processing systems. Vol. 109. Springer, 1981.
- Kulpa, Zenon. Diagrammatic interval analysis with applications. Diss. Instytut Podstawowych ProblemĂłw Techniki Polskiej Akademii Nauk, 2006.

Articles, a selection:

- Michalski, Ryszard S., and Zenon Kulpa. "A system of programs for the synthesis of switching circuits using the method of disjoint stars." (1972).
- Kulpa, Zenon. "Area and perimeter measurement of blobs in discrete binary pictures." Computer Graphics and Image Processing 6.5 (1977): 434-451.
- Kulpa, Zenon. "On the properties of discrete circles, rings, and disks." Computer graphics and image processing 10.4 (1979): 348-365.
- Kulpa, Zenon. "Diagrammatic representation and reasoning." Machine GRAPHICS & VISION 3 (1/2. 1994.
- Kulpa, Zenon. "Diagrammatic representation for a space of intervals." Machine Graphics & Vision. 1997.
- Kulpa, Zenon. "From picture processing to interval diagrams." Prace Instytutu Podstawowych Problemów Techniki PAN (2003): 1-313.
