= Mera-Elzab Meritum =

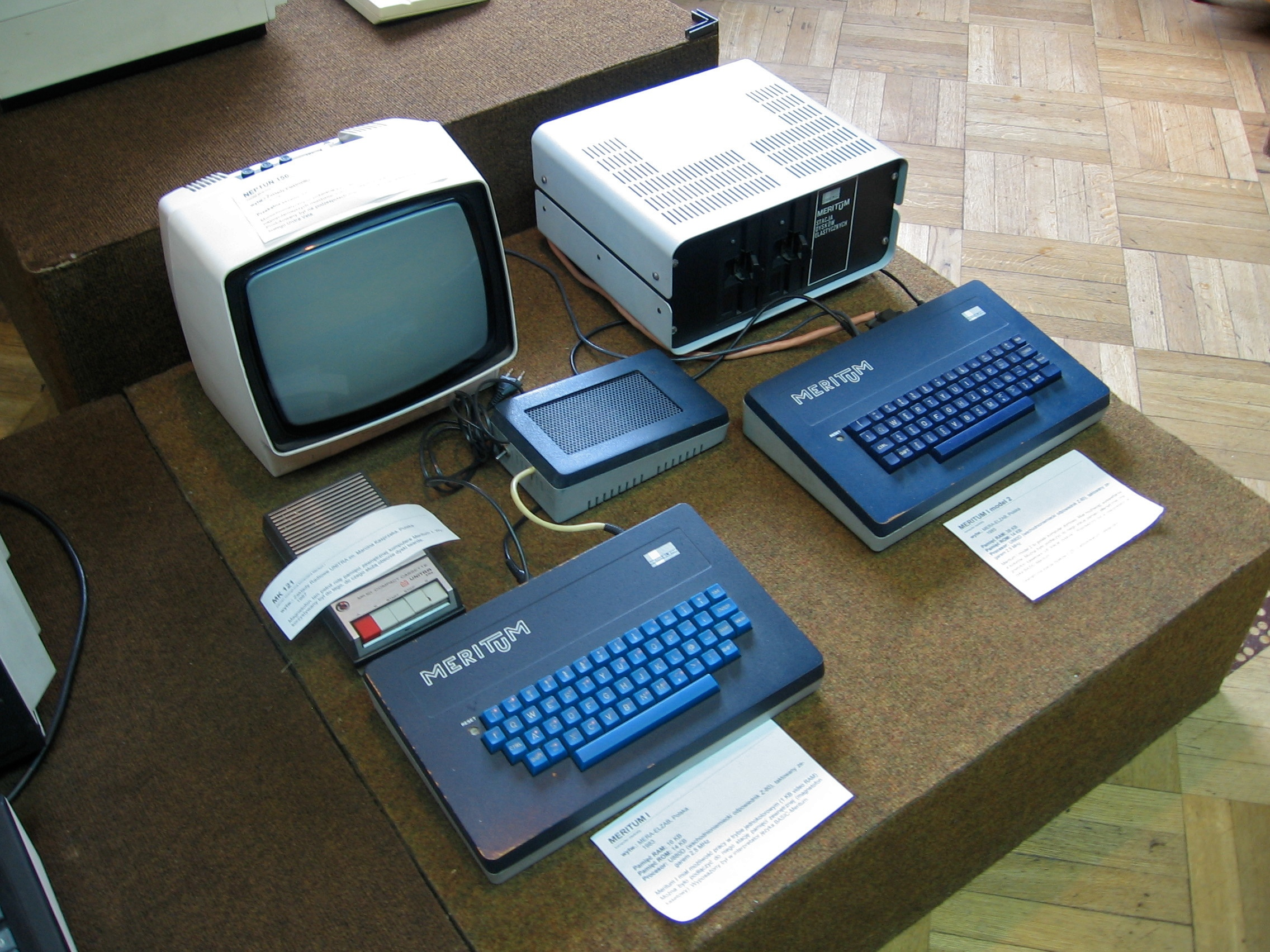
Meritum I (left) and Meritum I model 2 (right) machines, Unimor monitor

Mera–Elzab Meritum is a family of Polish personal computers based on TRS-80 Model I with BASIC Level II. Manufactured in the 1980s by Mera–Elzab in cooperation with ITM company.

== History ==
In the late 1970s and early 1980s, there was no small microcomputer available for the general public in Poland. The Polish computer industry was manufacturing only mainframe systems but not small computers for personal use.

In the 1980s, Mera–Elzab was in the group of 500 largest Polish industrial enterprises and 100 largest exporters. It produced terminals, monitors, and computers, but did not manufacture products for the mass consumer market.

ITM was a small foreign company operating in Poland selling measuring systems. In Poland under the rule of the communists, all companies (including Mera–Elzab) were state-owned. One exception was the companies owned by foreigners, often Polish emigrants.

Design of the Meritum began in 1982. It was a time of major economic crisis and martial law in Poland. Mera–Elzab analyzed existing western small computer systems and the following aspects were taken into account for a new product:

- System components: processor, peripheral and memory chips must be available in Poland or generally, in Comecon.
- TV or a cheap monitor as a display.
- The software in ROM memory.
- Tape recorder as mass storage.
- Possibility to connect existing peripherals (printer, punch tape reader).

Based on the above assumptions, TRS Model I with BASIC Level II was selected. It was a computer using a Zilog Z80 processor that could be replaced by the U880 made in East Germany. Peripheral chips produced in Poland by CEMI factory for the MCY7880 processor (Intel 8080 clone) could be used for both the Z80 and U880. Memory chips were available in the Soviet Union.

The company expected that due to the price the computer would not be available for individual users. Small businesses were the primary target market, followed by research and education institutions. They expected the computer would be also used as an industrial controller.

The fathers of the computer were Zygmunt Korga, later technical director of Mera–Elzab and Paweł Podsiadło, an employee of ITM company. They were friends from the time of study at the Silesian University of Technology.

The computer was presented to the public for the first time at the Poznań International Fair in the autumn of 1983. Production began in the summer of 1984. Preparation for production cost 10 million PLZ which was relatively cheap.

From 1984 to 1986 Mera–Elzab produced 2,500 units. The maximum production capacity of the plant was 4000 units per year. The computer was assembled in one room, where 5 people worked. Production of one computer consumed 20 man-hours. The computer accounted for 1% of the production value and at the best moment no more than 3%.

In 1986 Mera–Elzab sold the licence to Elwro company and terminated production. In 1987 Elwro finished production of Meritum as it started manufacturing its personal computer for schools Elwro 800 Junior.

The reception of the computer was initially positive, it was seen as the first Polish personal computer. Later opinions tend to be critical. The press pointed out technical specification is not impressive, especially lack of graphic mode. Besides, the TRS-80 was an unknown computer in Poland. There was no software or technical documentation on the market.

The computer never became popular, mostly because of a low number of units produced, the price and technical specification were not competitive to other products, and lack of software and documentation.

=== Comparison with other computers ===
Free market prices in 1986. The average salary in that year was 24,095 PLZ.

Computer	Price PLZ	Release	RAM KB	Text mode	Graphics mode	Sound channels
Meritum I	103,000	1983	48	64×16	128×48	1
ZX81	35,000	1981	1+16	32×24	64×48	0
ZX Spectrum	120,000	1982	48	32×24	256×192	1
Atari 800XL	95,000	1983	64	40×24	320×192	4
Commodore 64	175,000	1982	64	40×25	320×200	3

== Meritum I ==
Meritum I
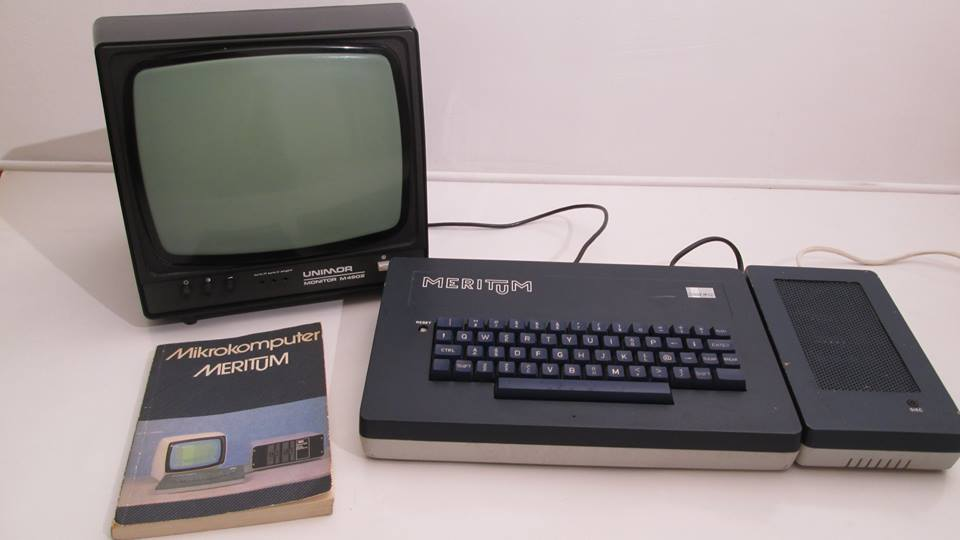
- Meritum I with monitor. Box on the right is power supply.
- Type: Personal computer
- Released: 1983; 43 years ago
- Operating system: TRS-80 Model I BASIC Level II
- CPU: U880 @ 2.5 MHz
- Memory: 16 or 17 KB
- Removable storage: Cassette Tape
- Display: Composite video, 64×16, 32×16 text; 128×48 semigraphics; monochrome
- Sound: Intel 8253, 1 channel

Based on U880 processor at 2.5 MHz. 17 KB of RAM (16 KB of DRAM and 1 KB SRAM); a 16 KB version was also available.

BASIC startup screen. RADIO SHACK LEVEL II BASIC message replaced to MERA ELZAB-ITM BASIC PC. Some versions displayed translated MEMORY SIZE as ROZMIAR PAO.

14 KB of ROM consisted of 12 KB BASIC. It was slightly modified TRS-80 Model I BASIC Level II. In additional 2 KB, monitor program was stored. The content of ROM was provided by ITM company.

The display circuit was similar to the TRS-80, it supported a 64×16 or 32×16 monochrome text mode only; low resolution 128×48 graphic mode simulated by semigraphics. The character generator resided in separate ROM memory, there was also separate 1 KB of video memory. Similar to TRS-80 keyboard, there were no lower case characters. No Polish-specific characters (ĄĘĆŚÓŃŁŻŹ) on the keyboard and character table.

Composite video signal was available on standard DIN socket. Due to the lack of a built-in TV modulator, it was not possible to connect directly to a TV. An external TV adapter working in channels 1–6 was available.

The computer was equipped with parallel and serial ports, which were not compatible with the TRS-80 Expansion Interface.

Parallel port was based on the MCY7855 universal I/O chip which was a Polish clone of the Intel 8255. It could be used to control industrial processes or other peripherals. Although Centronics printer may be connected, there was no software support for that option in ROM.

Serial port used the MCY7851 (clone of Intel 8251); transmission rates from 95 to 9600 baud were possible.

In addition, a hardware counter 8253 chip was available. Thanks to this chip the computer could generate sound (1 channel), initially using built-in speaker later using an amplifier in a monitor.

As mass storage, only cassette recorder can be used. Transmission speed was 500 baud.

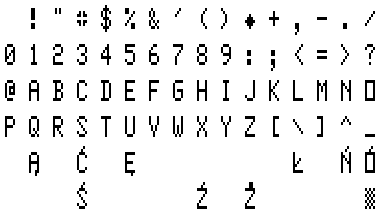
Meritum charset with Polish letters

At the end of the first year of production, the computer was slightly modified by adding support for Polish characters on the screen, a keyboard with Polish characters and the memory was expanded.

Main components
Chip	Equivalent	Count	Description
U880D	Z80	1	Processor made in East Germany.
K573RF2	2716	7	2 KB EPROM made in USSR.
K565RU3	4116	8	Dynamic RAM made in USSR.
2114		4	Static RAM 1 KB + 1 KB video RAM.
MCY7855	8255	2	Universal I/O made in Poland.
MCY7851	8251	1	Serial port made in Poland.
8253		1	Hardware counter.

== Meritum II ==
Meritum II
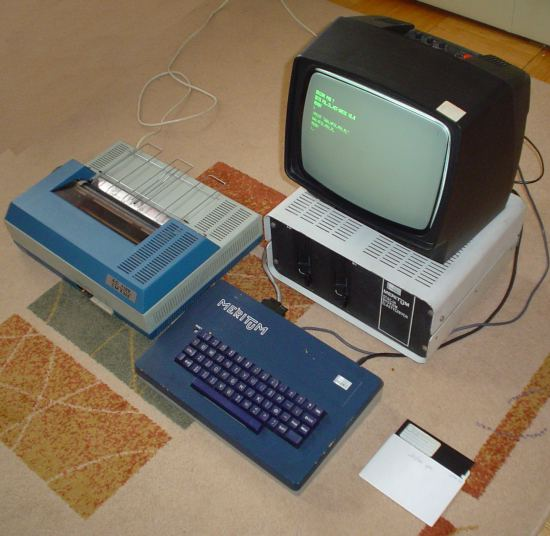
- Meritum II with a printer, monitor and floppy disk unit
- Also known as: Meritum I model 2
- Type: Personal computer
- Released: 1985; 41 years ago
- Operating system: CP/M 2.2, MER-DOS
- CPU: U880 @ 2.5 MHz
- Memory: 32, 48 or 64 KB
- Removable storage: Floppy disk
- Display: Composite video, 64×16, 32×16 text; 128×48 semigraphics; monochrome

Meritum II consists of the Meritum I model 2 computer and an external floppy disk unit with two 5¼″ drives.

=== Meritum I model 2 ===
The memory has been expanded to 32 KB or 48 KB. In the latter case, 64 KB were mounted but addresses colliding with ROM were not available. There were some changes in ROM adding support for disk drive, parallel printer and second timer chip as a sound generator (which was never installed in production units).

A second universal I/O chip 8255 (MCY7855) has been added for communication with the floppy disk unit.

Version with ROM memory to reduced to 8 KB existed. It stored procedures to load the program automatically from disk at startup. The computer could work under the control of CP/M 2.2 or MER-DOS (compatible with TRSDOS 2.3). BASIC was provided on a floppy disk.

=== Floppy disk unit ===
Placed in a large 360×192×315 mm housing with a weight of 12.5 kg (with power supply for both devices).

It was a separate specialized computer based on the Z80 processor @ 2 MHz with 2 KB EPROM and 1 KB RAM.

As the disk controller, the 8272 chip was used, which was able to handle single and double density disks.

It was equipped with two 5¼″ drives typically K5600 made in East Germany (users complained about the quality of these drives) with a capacity of about 100 KB. But other manufacturers' drives could also be used, eg Bulgarian IZOT 5255E. Supported disk capacities are 100 KB (single density) or 180 KB double density.

The computer was supplied with a diskette with the Disk-BASIC which was an extension of the standard BASIC.

The 8255 chip was used for communication with the Meritum computer. Data transmission was 250 kbit/s for double density disks or 125 kbit/s for single density. The computer and the disk unit were connected by a 25–wire cable.

== Meritum III ==
Meritum III
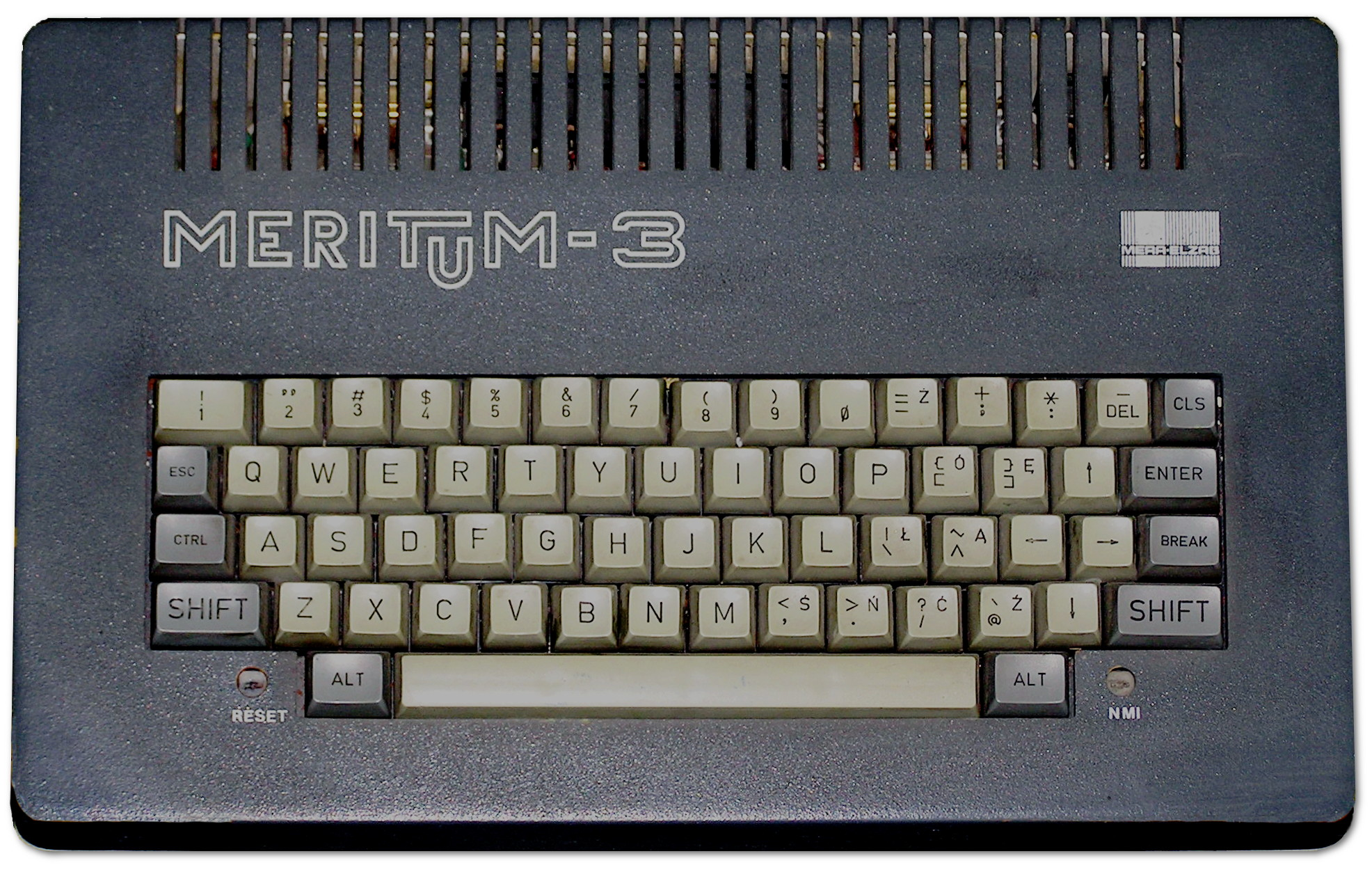
- Type: Personal computer
- Units sold: 100–300 units were manufactured
- Operating system: CP/M
- Display: RGB and Composite video 64 or 32×16 text; 128×48 semigraphics 512 or 256×192, 4 colors

Not mass-produced, only 100 to 300 pre-production units were made.

The graphic mode was added: monochrome 512×192 or 256×192 (4 colors).

Additional RGB signal on separate DIN socket was available.

The second serial port and one joystick DB9 port were added. The keyboard layout was changed.

It could work with Meritum II floppy drive unit.

== Network version ==
In 1985, Mera–Elzab submitted to the Ministry of Education a proposal to create a network version of a computer for Polish schools. In this configuration, the Meritum II computer with a connected disk drive would act as a server, student computers were based on Meritum I.

The network project was developed by scientists from the Computing Center of the Silesian University of Technology.

Finally, the Ministry rejected the offer. Elwro 800 Junior was later selected for schools. The Meritum network variant was not produced, only experimental units were made.
