= Tudor Tănăsescu =

Romanian engineer

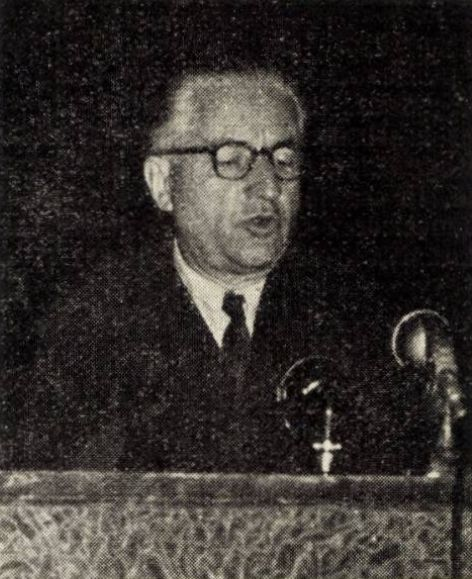
Tudor Tănăsescu

Tudor A. Tănăsescu (2 March 1901 – 7 August 1961) was a Romanian engineer. He was born and died in Bucharest.

He was a professor at the Politehnica University of Bucharest. He developed the theory and design methods of Class C radio power amplifiers. He was elected a corresponding member of the Romanian Academy in 1952.
