= Victor Toma =

Victor Toma (April 4, 1922 - November 26, 2008) was a Romanian engineer and scientist, known to be the creator of the first Romanian computer CIFA 1 in 1957 at the IFA - Institute of Atomic Physics. At the same institute he built CIFA 2, CIFA 3 CIFA 4 and CET 500 and at Bulgarian Academy of Sciences in 1964 the computer VITOSHA similar with CIFA 3. Since 1968 to his retirement he was head of laboratory in the Institute of computer engineering ITC Bucharest. He was made an honorary member of the Romanian Academy in 1993.
