= ES EVM =

Series of mainframe computers built in the Soviet Bloc countries in 1960s-1990s

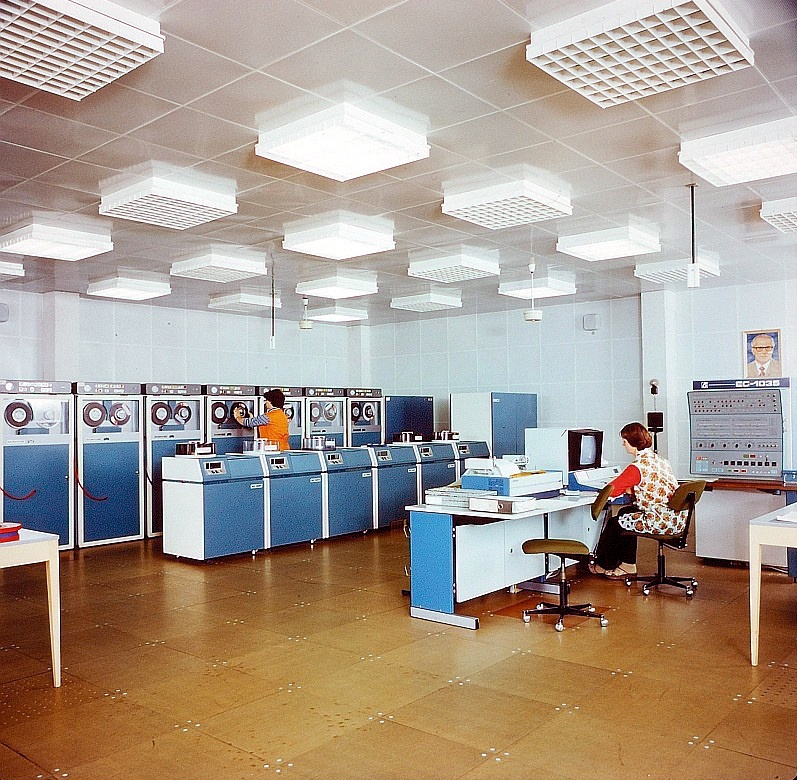
ES 1035

The ES EVM (Russian: Единая система электронных вычислительных машин (ЕС ЭВМ), romanized: Yedinaya sistema electronnykh vytchislitel'nykh mashin (ES EVM), "Unified System of Electronic Computing Machines"), or YeS EVM, also known in English literature as the Unified System or Ryad (Russian: Ряд, "Series"), is a series of mainframe computers generally compatible with IBM's System/360 and System/370 mainframes, built in the Comecon countries under the initiative of the Soviet Union between 1968 and 1998. More than 15,000 of the ES EVM mainframes were produced.

== Development ==
In 1966, the Soviet economists suggested creating a unified series of mutually compatible computers. Due to the success of the IBM System/360 in the United States, the economic planners decided to use the IBM design, although some prominent Soviet computer scientists had criticized the idea and suggested instead choosing one of the Soviet indigenous designs, such as BESM or Minsk. The first works on the cloning began in 1968; production started in 1972. In addition, after 1968, other Comecon countries joined the project.

With the exception of only a few hardware pieces, the ES EVM machines were recognized in the Western countries as independently designed, based on legitimate Soviet patents. Unlike the hardware, which was quite original, mostly created by reverse engineering, much of the software was based on slightly modified and localized IBM code. In 1974–1976, IBM had contacted the Soviet authorities and expressed interest in ES EVM development; however, after the Soviet Army entered Afghanistan, in 1979, all contacts between IBM and ES developers were interrupted, due to the U.S. embargo on technological cooperation with the USSR.

Due to the CoCom restrictions, much of the software localization was done through disassembling the IBM software, with some minimal modification. The most common operating system was OS ES (Russian: ОС ЕС), a modified version of OS/360; the later versions of OS ES were very original and different from the IBM OSes, but they also included a lot of original IBM code. There were even anecdotal rumors among the Soviet programmers, that this supposedly Soviet operating system contained some secret command which outputs the American national anthem. Today some of the Russian institutions that worked on ES EVM are cooperating with IBM to continue legacy support for both actual IBM mainframes and the ES EVM systems.

ES EVM machines were developed in Moscow, at the Scientific Research Center for Electronic Computer Machinery (NITsEVT); in Yerevan, Armenia, at Yerevan Computer Research and Development Institute; and later in Minsk, at the Scientific Research Institute of Electronic Computer Machines (NII EVM); and in Penza, at the Penza Scientific Research Institute of Computer Machinery. They were manufactured in Minsk, at the Minsk Production Group for Computing Machinery (MPOVT); and in Penza, at the Penza Electronic Computer Factory. Some models had been also produced in other countries of the Eastern Bloc, such as Bulgaria, Hungary, Poland, Czechoslovakia, Romania, and East Germany; some peripheral devices were also produced in Cuba. The former German chancellor Angela Merkel, used one of East Germany's ES EVM computers in 1986 for her PhD dissertation.

ES EVM computers were assigned to four subseries or generations (Russian: ряд, romanized: ryad), known as Ryad 1, Ryad 2, Ryad 3 and Ryad 4, this nomenclature gave rise to the common name for the whole project.

== Hardware models and technical details ==
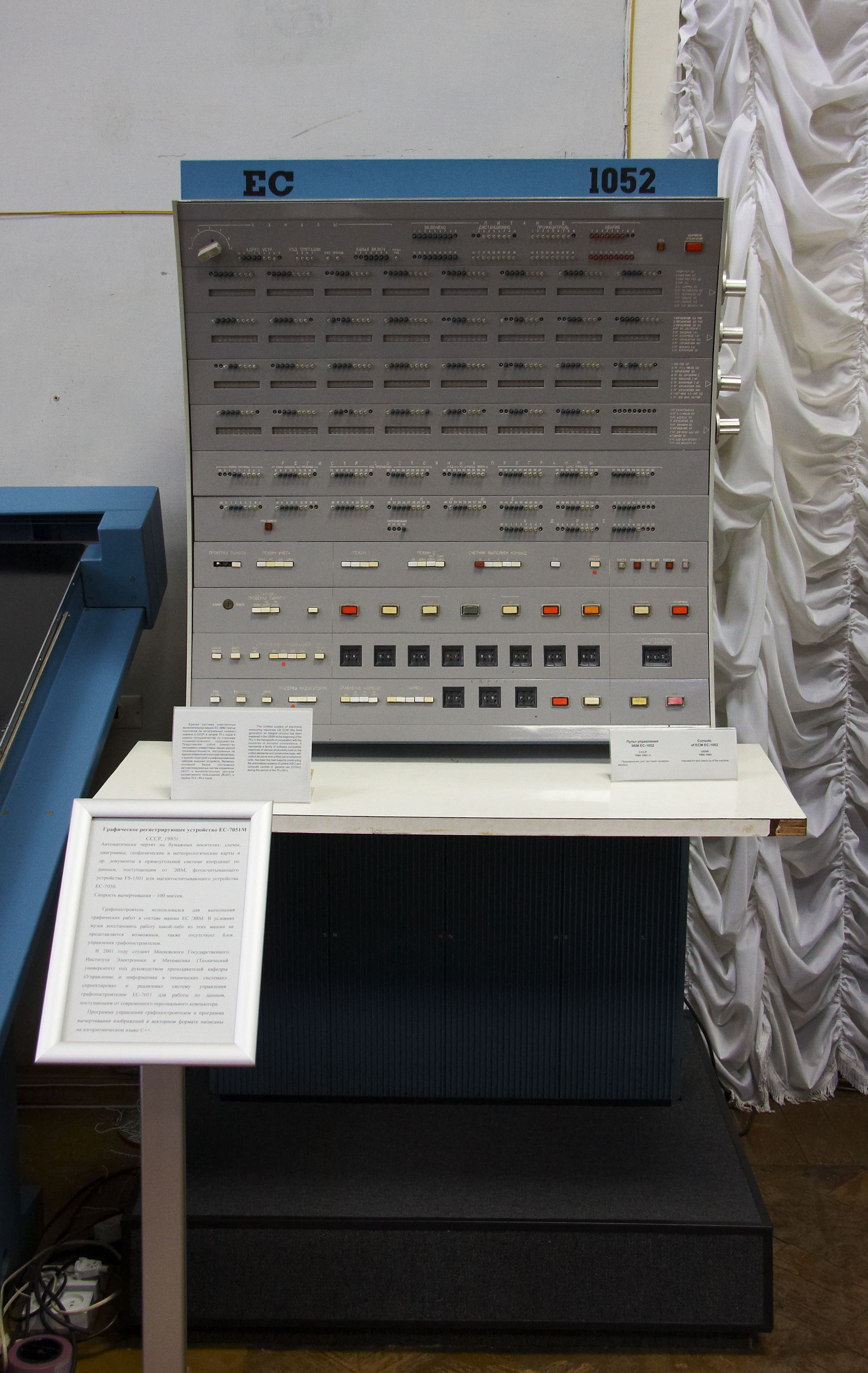
ES 1052 Control Unit

The first subseries of the ES EVM, released in 1969–1978, included the models 1010, 1020, 1030, 1040, and 1050, which were analogous to the System/360 and operated at 10–450 kIPS, and the more rare and advanced versions, incompatible with the IBM versions: 1022, 1032, 1033 and 1052. The electronics of the first models were based on TTL circuits; the later machines used ECL design. ES 1050 had up to 1M RAM and 64-bit floating point registers. The fastest machine of the series, ES 1052, developed in 1978, operated at 700 kIPS.

The second subseries, released in 1977–1978, included the models 1015, 1025, 1035, 1045, 1055, and 1060, analogous to System/370 and operated at 33 kIPS—1.050 MIPS. ES 1060 had up to 8M RAM.

The third subseries, released in 1984, were analogous to System/370 with some original enhancements, and included 1016, 1026, 1036, 1046, and 1066. ES 1066 had up to 16M RAM and operated at 5.5 MIPS. The fourth subseries had no direct IBM analogs and included 1130, 1181, and 1220. The last machine in the series, ES 1220, released in 1995, supported a number of 64-bit CPU commands, 256M RAM, and operated at 7 MIPS, but was not successful; only 20 such machines were ever produced, and in 1998 the whole production of ES mainframes was stopped.

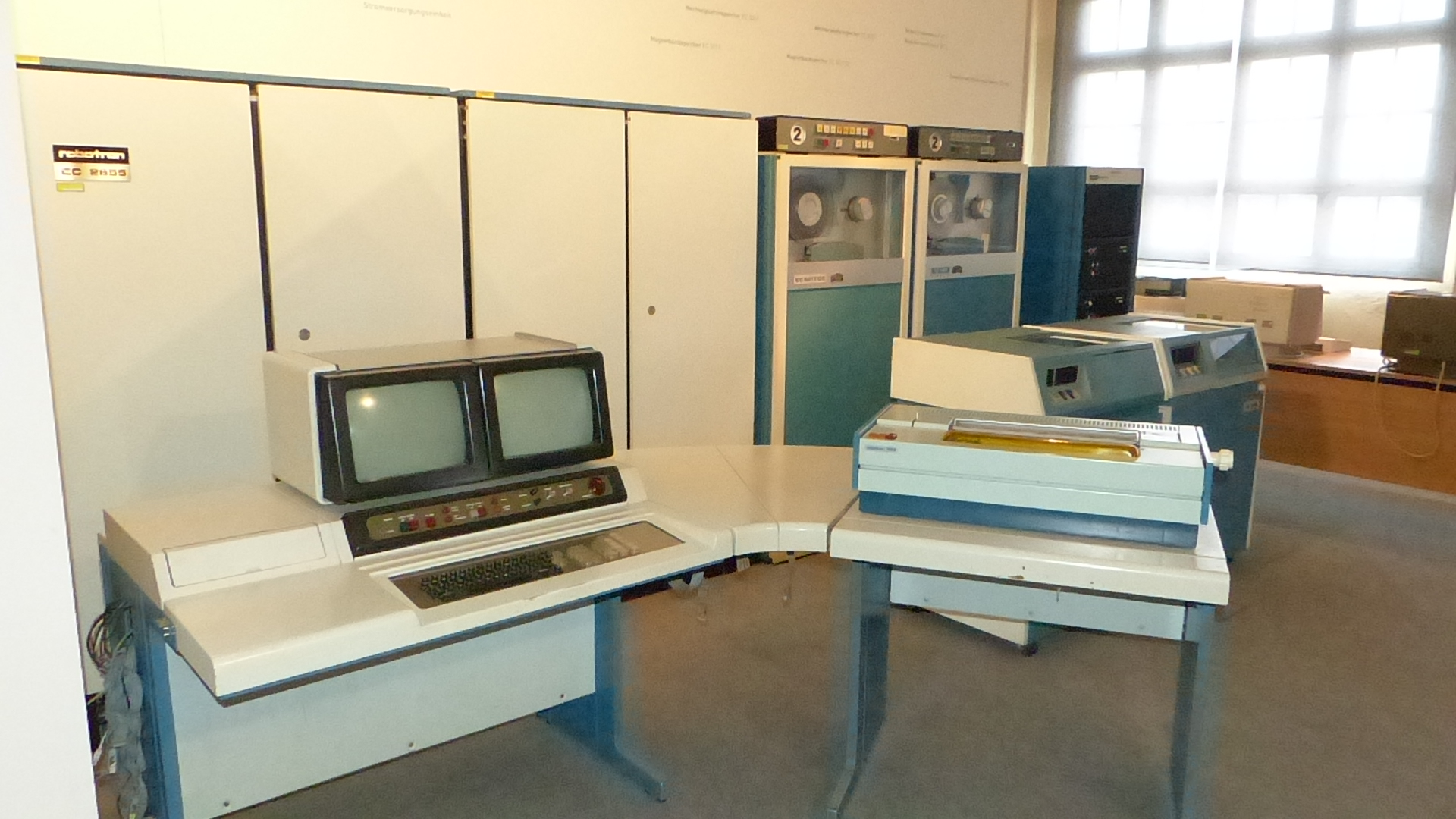
ES 1055

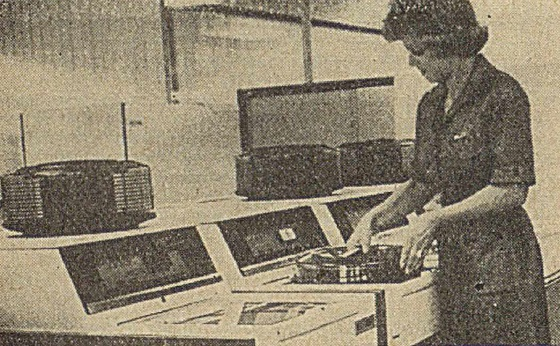
ES 5066

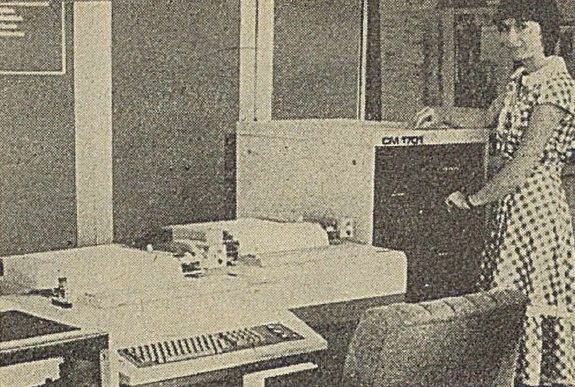
ES 7186

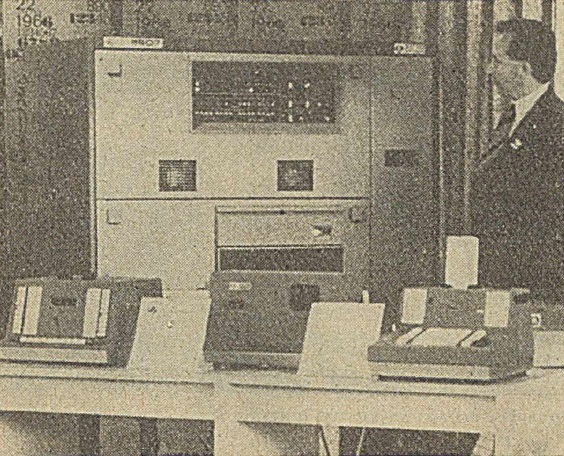
ES 8607

== See also ==
- History of computer hardware in Eastern Bloc countries
- SM EVM
- ES PEVM
