= LC80 =

Educational computer

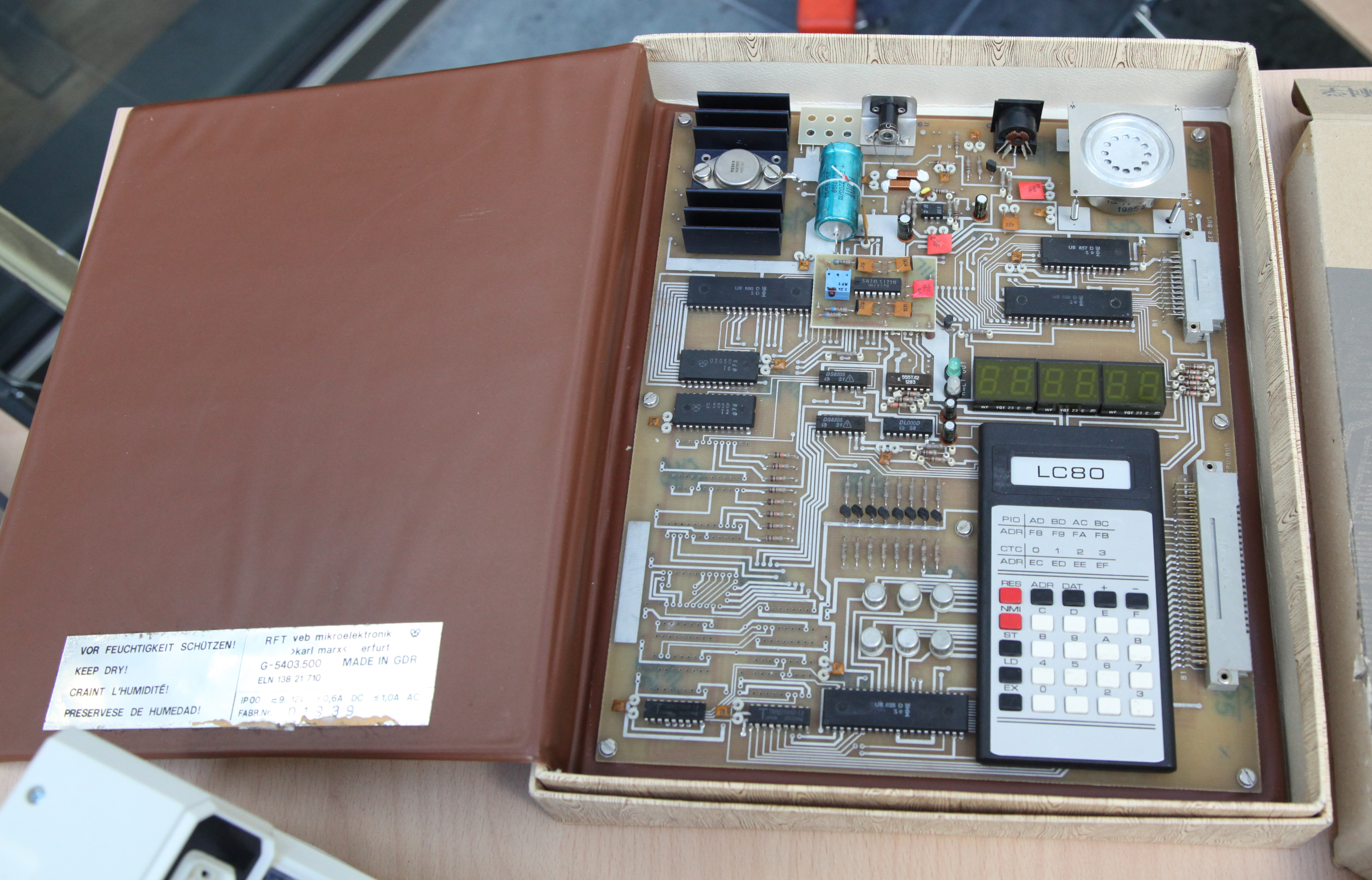
- Manufacturer: Kombinat Mikroelektronik Erfurt
- Type: Microprocessor development board
- Released: Mid-1984
- Introductory price: 720.00 M (without power supply)
- Discontinued: c. 1986/87
- Operating system: LC 80.1
- CPU: U880 @ 0.9 MHz
- Memory: 1 KB
- Storage: External cassette tape
- Display: 6-digit seven-segment display
- Sound: Buzzer
- Successor: Robotron Z1013 (1986)

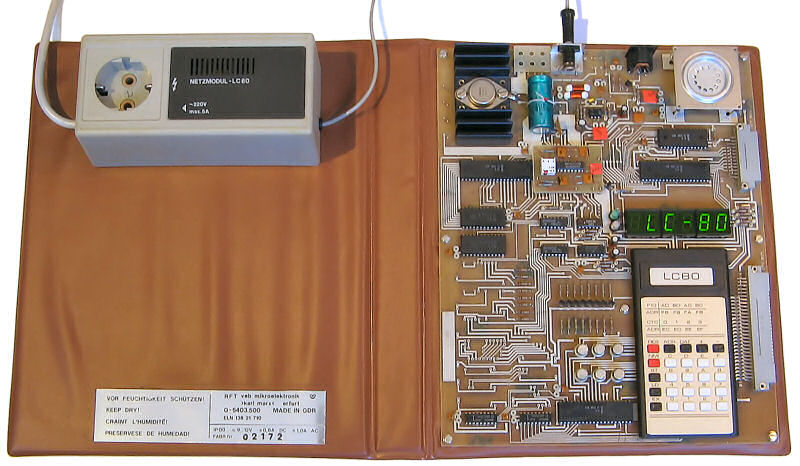
The learning computer with power supply

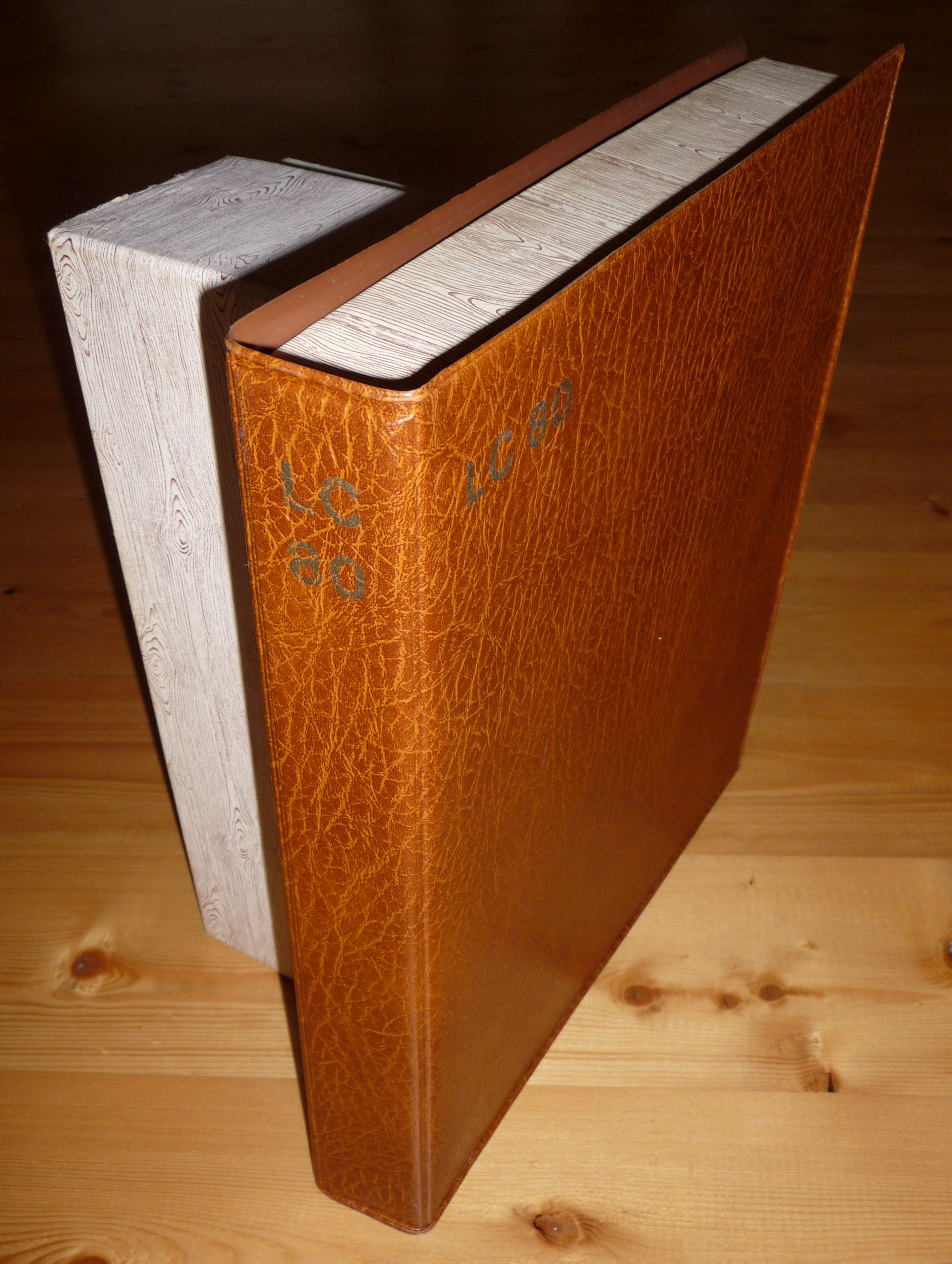
LC80 outside

The educational computer LC80 was a single-board computer manufactured in the German Democratic Republic (GDR) and intended for teaching purposes. It was the first computer that retail customers could buy in the GDR.

== History and development ==
The development of the LC 80 started in 1983. At the Leipzig Trade Fair in the spring of 1984 it was presented to the public. Early in 1985 the LC80 was on the market, making it the first computer available to retail customers in the GDR. The computers Z 9001 and HC 900 that had been shown at the same spring fair, could not be manufactured in sufficient quantity and were thus available only to educational institutions.

The learning computer LC 80 was developed in a very short period of time by a collective of the Consulting and Information Centre for Microelectronics of the Erfurt district in cooperation with the consumer goods department of VEB Mikroelektronik "Karl Marx" Erfurt. It was conceived in such a way that a device, which is as inexpensive as possible, allows a practical use of microprocessor technology by a broad circle of users. Prospective users are high school and vocational school students, students of electrical engineering/electronics, industrial control technicians and other interested parties. The LC 80 offers an almost unlimited field of application, ranging from hobby, school, training and continuing education to use in small industrial control systems.

— Dr. Werner Kämpf, developer,

The production probably ended around 1986/87.

== Technical details ==
The LC80 was programmed by entering hexadecimal machine codes via a built-in 25-key calculator keyboard (16 hexadecimal keys, 7 function keys, NMI, Reset). Programs could be saved and loaded via cassette tape or EPROM. Beside the CPU the board contained two PIO and one CTC integrated circuits as well as 1 KB of RAM and 2 KB of ROM.

Interfaces:

- cassette tape interface
- 12 programmable input / output lines, 4 Handshake lines, and 7 CTC lines
- CPU-bus (unbuffered)

=== Export version ===
Based on a request from the United Kingdom, an export variant was developed. This version differed from the conventional LC80 in the following details:

- wooden cabinet
- 12 KB ROM
- 4 KB RAM
- keyboard template for chess program SC-80 (similar to the East German chess computer SC2)

As the order from abroad did not come through in the end, only samples were manufactured of this version.

== Software and applications ==
Except for the operating system, no software was included. The manufacturer published a series of three booklets that contained software as hexadecimal machine code listings. Software and applications were published in journals such as Funkamateur (Morse code trainer) and Radio Fernsehen Elektronik (EPROM programmer, robot model control). Given the limited availability of computers in East Germany, the LC80 was even used to control scales underground in a potash mine.

== See also ==
Other microprocessor development systems with a hexadecimal display and hexadecimal program entry: MEK6800D2 (1976), KIM-1 (1976), TK-80 (1976), MK14 (1977), Acorn System 1 (1979), Micro-Professor MPF-I (1981), PMI-80 (1982), TEC-1 (1983)
