= Robotron Z1013 =

Single-board home computer made in East Germany from 1985 until 1990

Robotron Z 1013

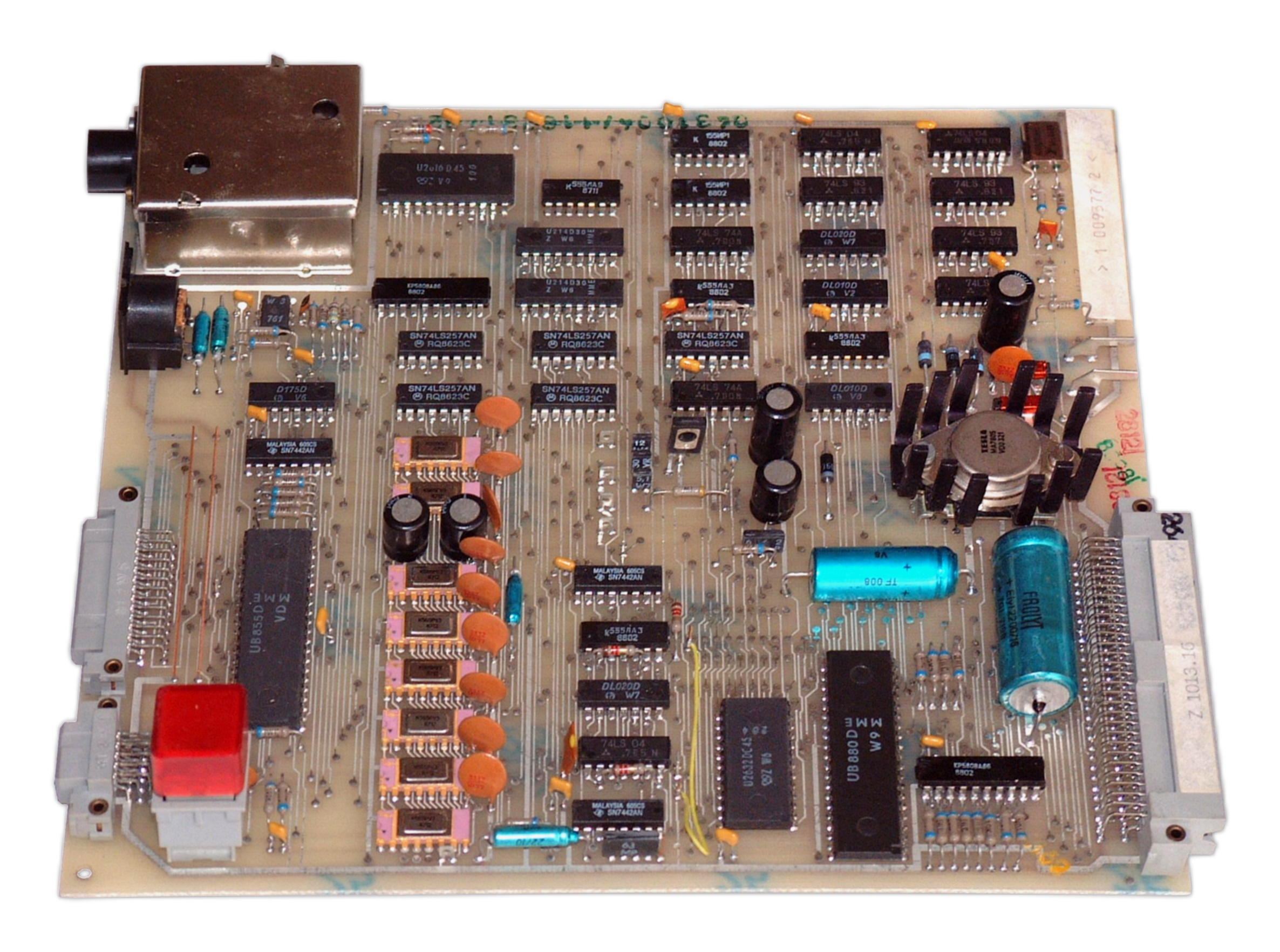
- Z 1013 board with distinctive 16Kb RAM chips
- Manufacturer: VEB Robotron-Elektronik Riesa
- Type: Single-board computer
- Released: Z 1013.01: 1985; Z 1013.12: 1985; Z 1013.16: 1987; Z 1013.64: 1988
- Lifespan: 5 years
- Introductory price: Z 1013.01: 650 M Z 1013.16: 965 M
- Discontinued: Z 1013.01, Z 1013.12: 1987; Z 1013.16, Z 1013.64: mid-1990
- Units sold: ~25.000
- Media: Compact cassette
- Operating system: Z 1013.01, Z 1013.12: Monitor 2.02 (2 KB); Z 1013.16, Z 1013.64: Monitor A.2 (4 KB), optional: Brosig Monitor (4 KB), character ROM (2 KB)
- CPU: Z 1013.01: U880 @ 1 MHz otherwise: 2 MHz
- Memory: Z 1013.01: 16 KB DRAM; Z 1013.12: 1 KB static RAM; Z 1013.16: 16 KB DRAM; Z 1013.64: 64 KB DRAM
- Display: monochrome, text mode 32 × 32 characters, 1 KB static RAM
- Connectivity: U855: GPIO / keyboard; DIN connector: tape recorder; Video: RF modulator; Expansion: K 1520 bus
- Power: 12 V AC, 50 Hz, 1 A
- Dimensions: 21.5 cm × 23 cm (8.4 in × 9.1 in)
- Weight: 1.3 kg

The MRB Z 1013 (German: Mikrorechnerbausatz, lit. 'microcomputer kit') was an East German single-board computer produced by VEB Robotron Riesa, which was primarily intended for private use and educational institutions. It was powered by a U880 processor (a Z80 clone) and sold together with a membrane (flat foil) keyboard. Initially, the kit was equipped with 16 kilobytes of DRAM, which was later replaced by a 64 KB version.

The kits first became available for sale in 1985 and were distributed in a unique way at the time. To purchase it, buyers had to send a postcard to the Robotron shop in Erfurt and wait six to twelve months and then to pick the kits up in person. The package contained the assembled and tested motherboard, a membrane keyboard, various small parts and detailed technical documentation. This basic kit was shipped without power supply or casing for the PCB. Most users tended to program the kit using the BASIC interpreter, which was loadable from compact cassette or by using a ROM cartridge. The BASIC interpreter contained a common core binary, which was identical across home computer models. In consequence, programs were widely compatible among different models of GDR-manufactured computers despite differences in capabilities.

Robotron was also the manufacturer of another line of computers, the Z 9001, KC 85/1 and KC 87, which shared some of the same expansion modules – offering more options also for Z 1013.

The expansion connector was based on the K 1520 bus standard for 8-bit computers made in GDR. This conformity to one standard across computers, ranging from tank-sized minicomputers to small home computers, allowed for reuse of hardware from all computers with the same bus interface. This meant that most hardware and binary code from one platform could be used across very different platforms and allowed for the sharing of resources.

This groundbreaking standardization was due to the need for common standards and compatibility between computers in the Eastern Bloc.

Opinion is divided over the widespread use and popularity of the MRB Z 1013 in the GDR. With a total of 25.000 kits sold over its lifetime from 1985 to mid-1990, it fared well in comparison to other models. However, some analysts put this success down to the relative ease of access to the kits compared to other computer offerings.

After all, key point for success was the simplistic makeup down to bare minimum. It is still debatable if it repelled potential users or actually lead to higher production volumes. Either way, demand and production kept kind of balance. To this extent, it was the only computer freely available for private purchase.

== History ==
Despite the Cold War and the associated high-technology embargo CoCom, the government pushed for an ambitious program to keep up with international development in engineering and microelectronics. That generated huge interest among individuals who tried to develop electronics at work or at home aside from government's economic programs. In 1984, the first two lines of home computers, the Z 9001 and HC 900 were presented to the public. Due to the small scale of production those computers were difficult to obtain and very expensive.

With production yield of a few percent, a significant amount of integrated circuits failed to pass the acceptance criteria. The components were called "Anfalltyp" or "rejects". Most of them were functional but exceed allowed tolerances. Within limits, e.g. speed or access time, they may work fine. Consequently, manufacturing companies pushed for the development of simple fault-tolerant learning and hobby computers, which can make use of rejects. This approach could lower reported defect rates and partly close the gap in demand for home computers.

Following the concept of selling rejects for a fraction of the original price, the computer design would only consist of the cheapest and easiest available circuits. Therefore, three single board computers were selected for industrial production: the LC80 with calculator display and keyboard, the Polycomputer 880 with 8-digit seven-segment display and the more comfortable Z 1013 with TV output.

The initiators of the Z 1013 concept favored a caseless single-board computer with membrane keyboard. Through simple appearance and design, the price had to be kept under 1000 Marks for the targeted group of electronics amateurs. Development and production was transferred to well-established industry PCB manufacturer VEB Robotron Riesa in early 1984.

=== Development ===
The state planning targets for the mostly young engineers and employees from the corresponding group of developers ("youth research collective") of VEB Robotron Riesa envisioned an expandable single board computer with a minimum of material and manufacturing costs. To reduce production costs, the device was designed as a kit without a housing whose prefabricated parts were to be fully assembled by the user. Also, the computer had to utilize existing home electronics such as television sets and tape recorders already present in East German households.

Production should be based exclusively on rejects made in GDR and Comecon states. Additionally, the new system would have to be largely compatible with regards to interfaces and software to Robotron microcomputers Z 9001 and KC 85/1. It was only feasible to meet such tight requirements by a system architecture utilizing the very affordable and field-proven U880 8-bit microprocessor.

True graphics modes and specific interfaces for peripheral devices fell victim to cost pressure. However, the concept as modular computer provided for the possibility of connecting additional peripherals, such as memory expansions, via modules for the K 1520 bus.

Development work began in mid-1985. The first prototype with 16 kilobytes (KB) of memory and a membrane keyboard was presented to responsible authorities in fall of 1985. After acceptance, planning and preparations for the series production began, which lasted until November 1985. Because of the rejects used, the system clock was reduced from 2 MHz as usually found in home computers to 1 MHz for higher reliability.

=== Z 1013.01 and Z 1013.12 ===
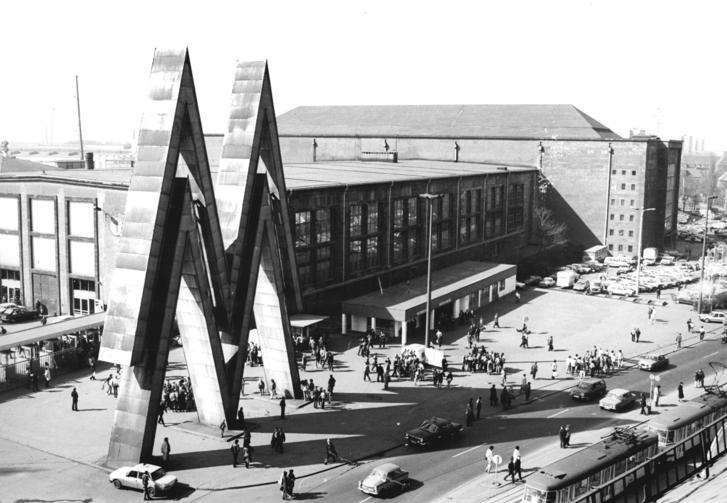
International presentation of the Z 1013 at Leipzig Spring Fair in 1986

The first batch of 150 kits with 16 KB of memory went into production in December 1985. They were available for pick up at end of the year exclusively, and only after pre-order, in the store for home electronics of VEB Robotron in Erfurt and in a store of state-owned Handelsorganisation (HO) in Riesa for 650M. In addition to display unit and tape recorder, the user also had to provide an appropriately sized power supply and to solder the connecting cable for the keyboard onto the mainboard before commissioning. The single-board computer was officially presented to a wider audience for the first time at Leipzig Spring Fair in 1986.

In addition to the supply of the home computer market, a few kits with designation Z 1013.12 were manufactured for the industrial sector by 1987. It used regular circuits, an increased system clock of 2 MHz, 1 KB of video memory as well as 1 KB of static RAM as main memory.

Robotron also developed additional components for its internal usage, like a pixel graphic extension or a battery-backed memory expansion of 4KB. Even though those were not available via official Robotron sales channels, goal was to provide that information as reference and to enable independent reuse.

Despite extensive tests and multi-stage, multi-day duration tests during production, the installed rejects often caused problems and thus complaints from users. Economic disadvantages due to elaborate test procedures and subsequent repairs could no longer be outweighed by the low price of rejects and led to a rethinking by persons in charge. From July 1987 onward, production was changed to use regular components, which have fallen in price by then, and the updated kit was sold as Z 1013.16.

=== Z 1013.16 and Z 1013.64 ===
Since differences between rejects and regular chips was limited to their reliability only, the decision to use regular components could be made in 1987 without major changes to the mainboard and therefore cheaply. In addition to increased reliability, the Z 1013.16 variant also has a higher system clock of 2 MHz, which is equivalent to doubling of the computing power. Also, the system software has been updated to support a much more comfortable regular keyboard with 58 keys. Owners of older kits could after procurement of components and modified operating system also upgrade their systems with the aid of a soldering iron.

An important aspect of upgrades made to the memory subsystem is - apart from improved reliability - superior compatibility of the Z 1013.16 kit with microcomputers Z 9001, KC 85/1 and KC 87. In addition to availability of their software also their expansion modules were now usable. Due to the interim relaxation of the CoCom embargo, and with it associated falling prices in late 1988, a more modernized version of the Z 1013 series was added. This Z 1013.64 kit with 64 KB of memory was made until production ceased in mid-1990.

=== Modern replicas ===
The simple and manageable system architecture, its extensive documentation from the manufacturer and not at least the free availability of the system software allows for miniaturized replica of the Z 1013 with today's technical means and with manageable effort. Such modern realization was done for the first time in 2013 - like with other home computer systems too - as implementation via programmable gate array (FPGA), inclusive its development environment. Replica using FPGAs were initially intended only as a technical feasibility study, but in retrospect proved also its practical utility: Due to miniaturization and possibility to run in battery mode, it is an easily stowable, reliably working and portable alternative to the preserve-worthy original technology.

== Technical details ==
The fully assembled printed circuit board by Robotron contains the CPU, RAM and ROMs, video generation circuits and multiple peripheral connectors. The mainboard measured 215 mm × 230 mm (8.4 in × 9.1 in). It was delivered along with a keyboard of dimension 80 mm × 160 mm (3.1 in × 6.3 in), connection cables, various small parts and documentation.

=== CPU ===
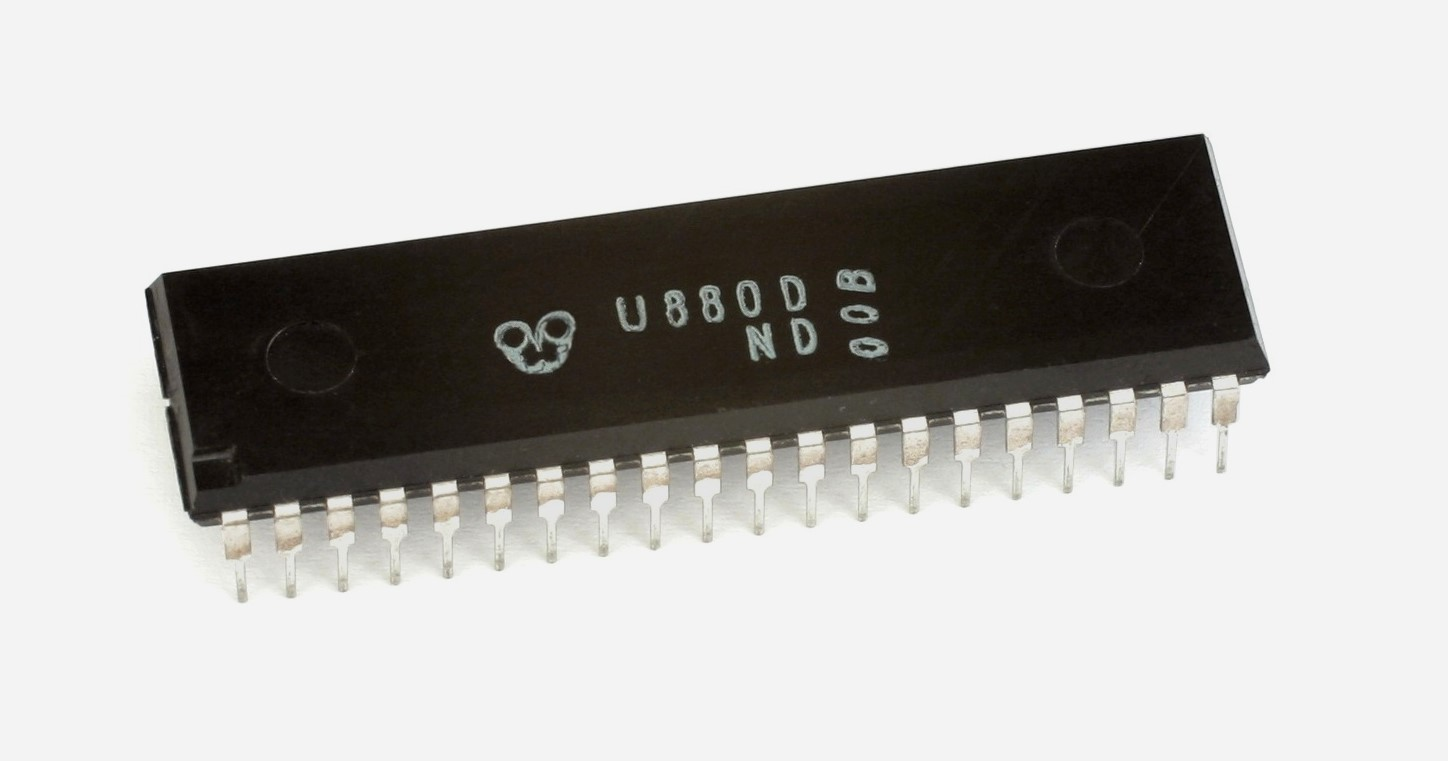
Microprocessor U880

The system architecture is based on the U880 microprocessor, an unauthorized replica of the Z80 microprocessor from Zilog. Z 1013.01 models were clocked with only 1 MHz as they used chips which had passed only limited quality criteria ("rejects"). For other models, fully qualified, regular types like the 2 MHz U880 microprocessor were used. The CPU has an address range of 64KB, whereby 59 KB are available as RAM for programs. To overcome this limitation, external RAM disks and bank switching were used frequently.

=== Memory allocation, RAM, ROM and interfaces ===
The memory that is addressable by the CPU is segmented into regions for use by the system software, freely usable memory, pluggable expansions and the graphics memory. The system software often simply referred to as "machine language monitor" is either flashed on a 2KB or 4KB ROM chip, depending on computer model. Memory addresses for the system software range from $F000 to $F7FF or $FFFF respectively. After power on, the system software also uses the memory between $0000 and $0100 to store various variables, so this space should not be used by the user either.

Addresses of freely usable memory (nearly 16KB) range from $0100 to $3FFF on the Z 1013.1 and Z 1013.6 and can go up to $E000 if the system has been expanded with 16 KB RAM modules. The 64KB version Z 1013.64 further extends the memory range up to $EC00 where video memory starts and takes up the address space to $EFFF. To program the computer in the desired programming language, such as Tiny BASIC with 3 KB or the significantly larger KC 87 BASIC with 10 KB, it must be loaded into memory from audio cassette or added via plug-in cartridge. Loading Tiny Basic from cassette into an unexpanded system with 16 KB of RAM, for example, leaves 12 KB of free memory for writing BASIC programs. Therefore, a memory upgrade is recommended for larger programming projects. However, if the programming language is resident in a plug-in module then the usable memory of the Z 1013.01 and Z 1013.16 is not affected.

For connecting peripherals the computers are equipped with cassette interface and user port (a built-in U855-PIO). In case of Z 1013.01, these chips are also rejects. A bus expansion slot for modules based on the K 1520 bus is available.

=== Graphics, input and output ===
For the generation of video output, the systems came from factory only with a character generator. It can produce text and graphic symbols (semigraphics) with 8 × 8 pixels and it provides a screen resolution of 32 × 32 characters. The required character set in ROM contains 96 alphanumeric and control characters as well as 146 graphic symbols. A pixel graphics mode is by default not available, but can be implemented by the user. Relevant instructions were published in various magazines and books until early 1990s. The monochrome image is fed to a built-in RF modulator and then transmitted through the coaxial antenna port for use by standard TV; an upgrade to color output is possible.

Keyboard and interface for tape recorder are managed by built-in I/O chip U855-PIO (Parallel Input Output). Also this chip was a reject initially.

== Peripherals and expansion modules ==
In addition to expansion modules sold by Robotron countless more exist, many of which were published in printed publications.

=== Mass-storage ===
Western home computers of the 1980s used mainly tape recorders and floppy disk drives for data storage, in professional environments and personal computers increasingly also hard - and removable disk drives. The cheapest method to store data is on compact audio cassette, which has the disadvantage of low data transfer rates and thus long loading times. Whereas, the much faster and more reliable floppy disks and hard disk drives were much more expensive to purchase, and in case of the GDR were hardly available at all. Upon publication of the Z 1013, only cassette recorders and reel-to-reel tape recorders were available for data storage purposes. Ports for connecting disk drives became popular only after German reunification.

==== Cassette recorder ====
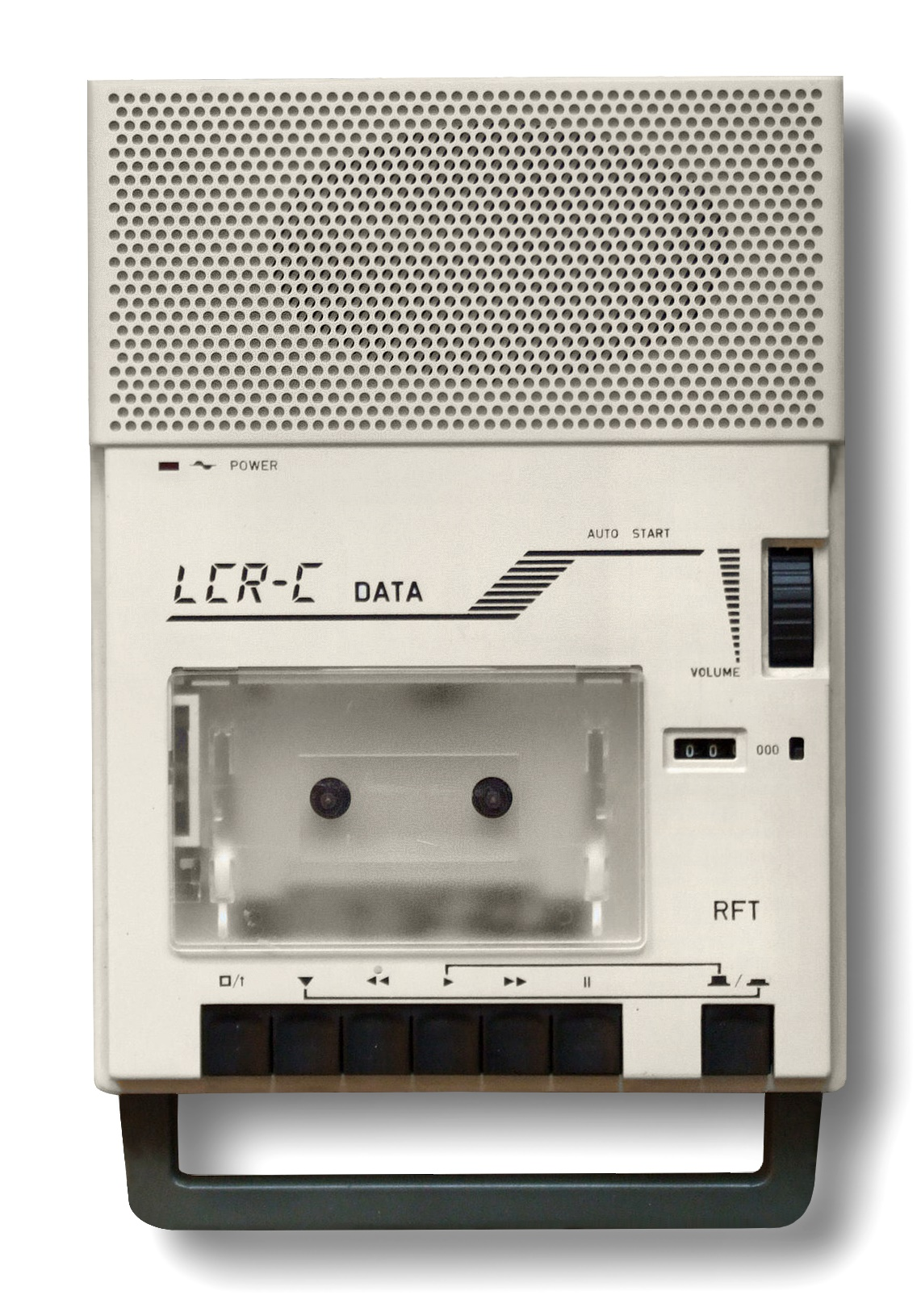
Cassette recorder LCR-C DATA

For the purpose of storing programs, the Z 1013 computer is equipped with an interface to connect to standard cassette recorders. Recorders had to comply with minimum requirements for contact configurations and frequency response. Frequently used here were small-scale devices, such as types Geracord, Datacord and later LCR-C DATA, as manufactured by VEB Elektronik Gera. The maximum transmission speed is 1200 bit/s.

==== Floppy systems ====
A disk drive for the Z 1013 was never planned by the Robotron designers because of its hobby character and therefore its low economic priority, especially so as appropriate control electronics had to be imported expensively until 1987. With availability of the U8272 chip produced in the GDR, which is a replica of Intel floppy disk controller P8272A, suggestions and basic procedures for building one's own floppy system for GDR-based home computers were published. The prevailing shortage in the GDR, especially in the field of drive mechanisms, made it almost impossible to obtain them, and thus to build a disk system for the economically insignificant Z 1013 so that instructions for construction were published only after reunification.

In mid-1992, magazine Funkamateur published a simple hardware interface along with software for operation of the Commodore 1541-II floppy with the Z 1013. It has a capacity of 170 KB per disk side. The recording format is compatible with Commodore computers and thus, data from both systems are easily interchangeable.

=== Chassis and power supply module ===
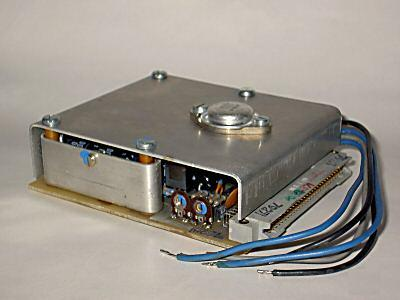
The power supply module Z 1013.40

Due to their minimalistic hardware, the computers may be used for most simple tasks only. More demanding projects and applications require upgrades and expansions. A special role has module Z 1013.50, which provides four expansion slots for the K 1520 bus along with required signal amplification and control logic. One of these slots, however, is permanently occupied by power supply module Z 1013.40 since the manufacturer's recommended power supply for the Z 1013 is not designed to power additional modules. All slots of the rack are plug-wise compatible with expansions for the Z 9001, KC 85/1 and KC 87 computers, whereby such modules often had to be modified slightly. If the extender is to be used with the Z 1013.64 then both parts require modifications.

=== Memory and additional interfaces ===
In order to upgrade the RAM, the manufacturer recommended using RAM modules of type 1.40.690003.5 for Z 9001, KC 85/1 and KC 87 systems. In addition, there was a freely configurable ROM module from Robotron, which can accommodate up to four EPROMs, each with a storage capacity of 1, 2 or 4 KB.

For both expansion modules, the address range in which they are to be mapped must be set up first using DIP switches. Additional communication ports may be added with module Z 1013.30, which provides three freely programmable 8-bit I/O ports and a V.24/RS-232 interface to operate, for example, printers.

In addition to modules sold by Robotron, there are solutions from third parties that were also manufactured in larger quantities and often served as mass storage solution in form of a RAM disk. The most widespread version comes from VEB Präcitronic and contains 256 KB of main memory, of which 64 KB are used as main memory and 192 KB as switchable memory banks. With appropriately modified system software, such RAM disks were often used as replacement for tape-based mass storage.

=== Keyboard and joystick port ===
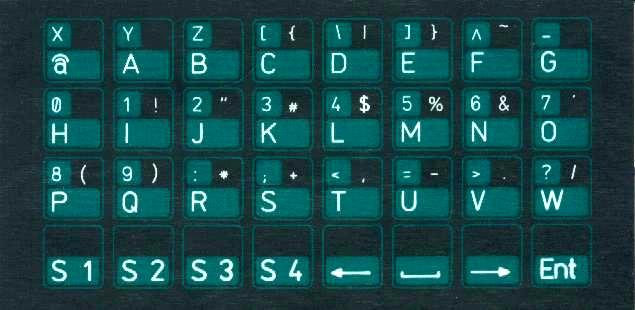
The Z 1013's membrane keyboard.

The membrane keyboard for the Z 1013 computer featured alphabetically placed keys arranged in a 8 x 4 matrix. The membrane keyboard included a 12-pin ribbon cable that the user had to connect to the mainboard before first use.

The keys proved to be unresponsive and tended to bounce. Productive use was almost impossible. Soon, users desired and developed alternatives. As standard solution for connecting convenient keyboards with QWERTY arrangement prevailed the Brosig Monitor, a software module of 4 KB which supplied additional utilities, added support for joysticks and came with backward compatibility for the system software from Robotron. Along with a corresponding hardware interface, it was presented to wider audiences in magazine MP Mikroprozessortechnik [de] in 1988.

With an additional module that is available separately for the Z 1013.64, keyboards with 64 keys, such as those supplied with most GDR office computers, can be used also.

=== Graphics modules ===
Many articles in magazines and brochures were devoted to improving the graphical capabilities. These included instructions for building various expansions of varying scope and also notes for acquisition of prefabricated modules. The spectrum includes:

- Improvements to the character generator (graphics card GDC with support for a screen resolution of 80 × 25 characters, developed by Computer Club Jena)
- Monochrome high-resolution pixel graphics cards (256 × 256 pixels, KRT-Grafik for Kleinstrechner-TIPS 11 and 256 × 192 pixels, Spectrum-Grafik in periodical practic [de])
- A multicolored high-resolution graphics card (384 × 288 pixels, VIS3 with 16 colors from Academy of Sciences).

Robotron itself did not offer such upgrades.

Overview of expansion modules produced by Robotron
Type designation	Designation	Function	Price (year)
Z 1013.50	Subrack	Provides four additional slots	EVP 316 M (1988)
Z 1013.40	Power supply module	Power supply for rack	EVP 137 M (1988)
Z 1013.30	I/O module	Interface deployment (e.g. V.24)	EVP 233 M
Z 1013.20	ROM-Module	4 EPROMs with software	EVP 213 M
1.40.690003.5	RAM-Module	16 KB of memory	EVP 618 M

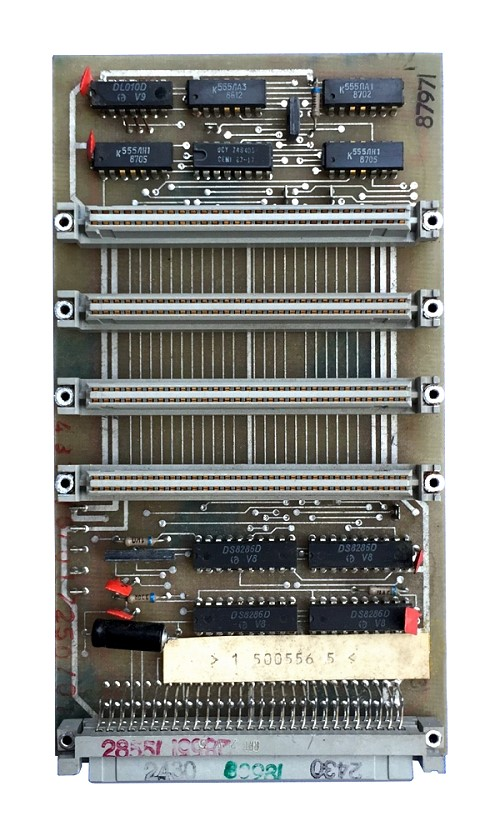
Z 1013.50

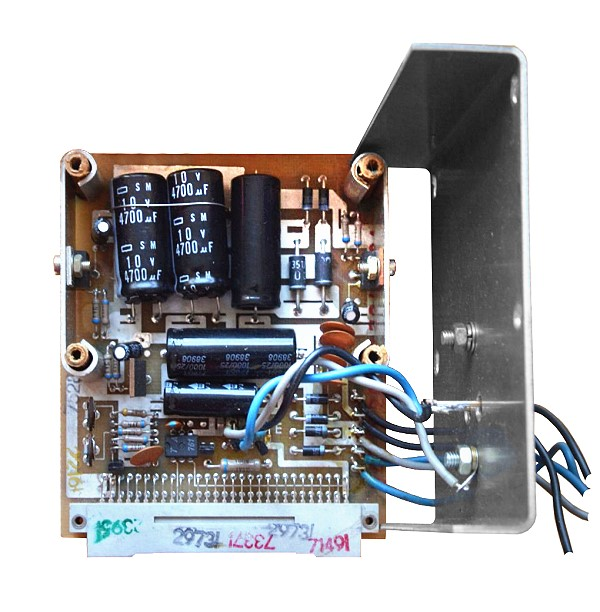
Z 1013.40

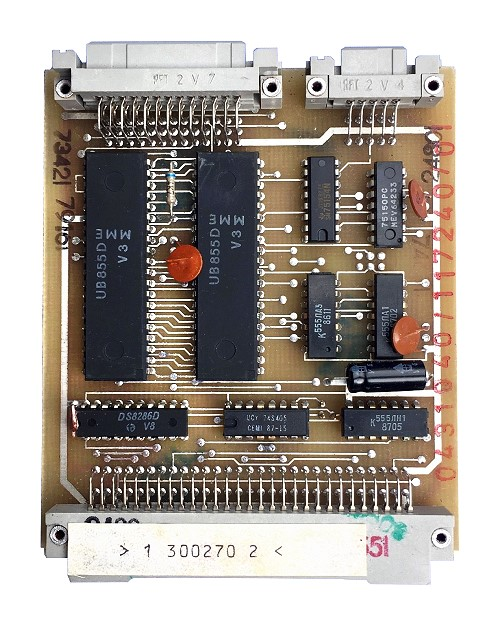
Z 1013.30

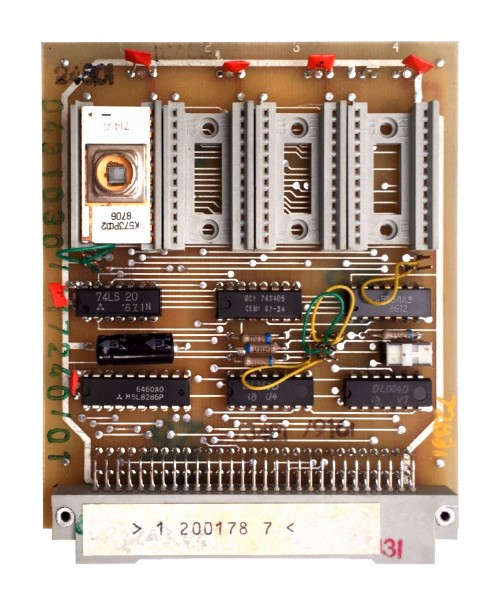
Z 1013.20

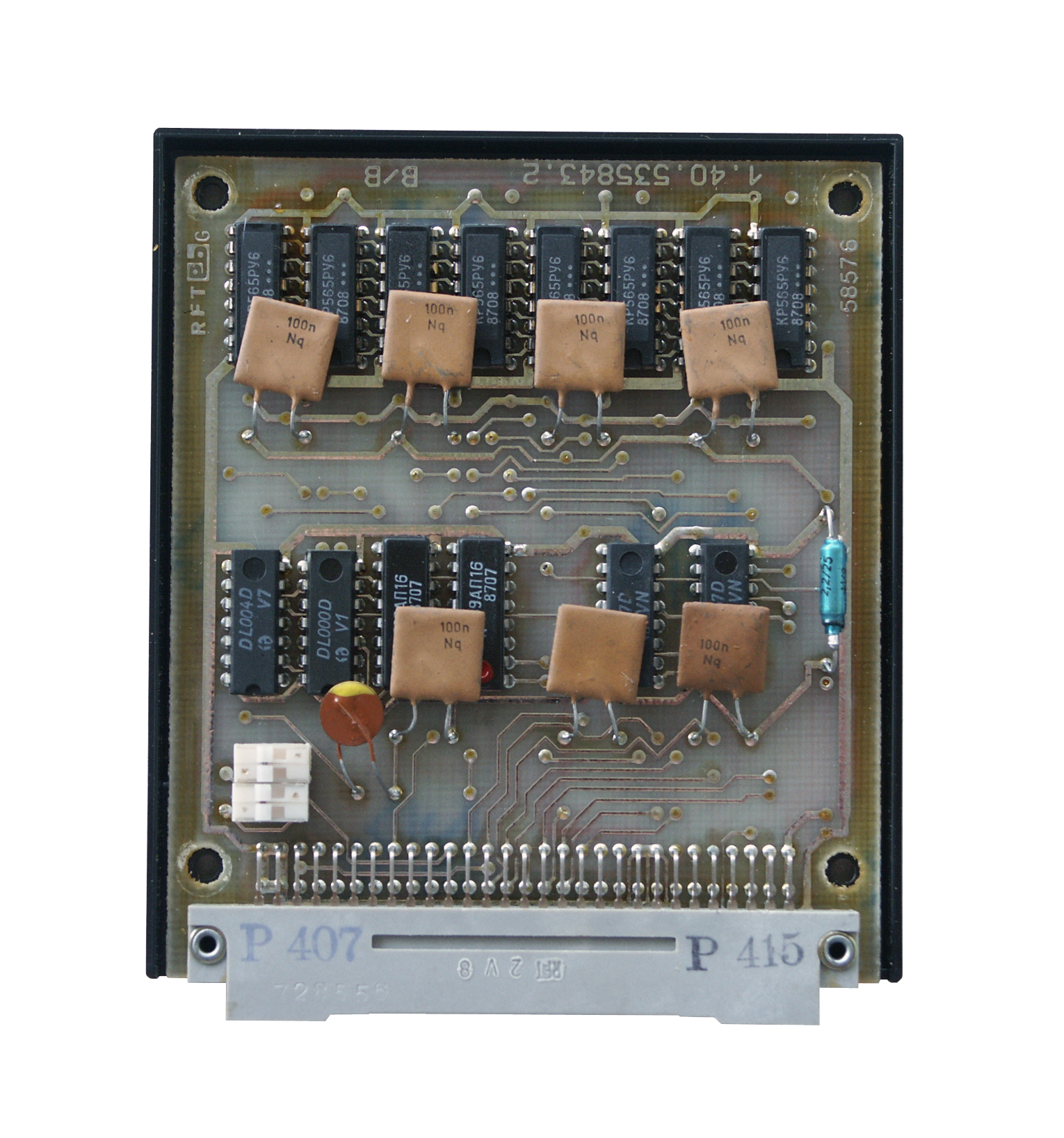
1.40.690003.5

== Software ==
Available software was mainly in-house developments made in GDR. Porting of programs from Western Z80-based home computers was very difficult due to technical differences in external circuits. However, programs for computer series Z 9001, KC 85/1 and KC 87 could be ported easily. The proliferation of software and exchange of experiences was carried out mainly through private contacts as well as newspaper ads, trade shows, by prints of programs in magazines and broadcast on radio, such as in broadcast Rem [de]. The state promoted the creation of software, for example, through Gesellschaft für Sport und Technik (GST) with their computer groups. Often, the GST was also one of the organizers of meetings and conferences.

Restrictions on software distribution based on copyright or copy protection mechanisms did not exist in practice. Rather, the 'free' distribution of software ("Amateur Software") was promoted in relevant meetings. For the Z 1013, more than 500 programs and hardware expansions were developed and published.

=== System tools ===
Services to set up the computer hardware, to control the cassette interface, and to write and read memory are provided by the operating system contained in ROM. The Monitorprogramm (device monitor program) version 2:02 is used for models Z 1013.01, Z 1013.12 and Z 1013.16, and version A.2 for the Z 1013.64 model. The system software for model Z 1013.64 also provides support for a comfortable keyboard with 58 keys, in contrast to previous Z 1013 models, which support just the keyboard with 32 keys.

In addition to Robotron's monitor programs, there is other third-party system software that the user can install in EPROMs. The Brosig Monitor, introduced in 1987 and subsequently widely used, deserves special mention here. It is backwards compatible with the Robotron system software. In addition to useful utilities, the 4 KB Brosig Monitor offers among other things the option of using the Z 1013.01 and Z 1013.16 models with joysticks and more comfortable keyboards.

Models with RAM disk allow running CP/M alike system software Single User Control Program (SCP) [de]. Therefore, some programs from the extensive SCP library are also available for Z 1013 computers.

=== Programming languages and applications ===
Due to limited graphics and sound capabilities, Z 1013 machines were mainly used for programming and for applications such as word processors. There are also some video games that are compatible with monochrome text-mode graphics and lack of sound, such as chess programs Video Chess-Master [de] and Cyrus-Chess.

Tools are available for programming the Z 1013 in other programming languages. In addition to assemblers (assembler 5.3 scf and editor/assembler EDAS) there are high-level languages such as Tiny BASIC, KC-BASIC [de], BASICODE, Forth and Pascal available.

== Device-specific literature ==
The kit came from factory with extensive printed documentation. On one hand it describes hardware and monitor program in detail, and on the other it contains further software in form of assembler and BASIC code listings.

There were no special magazines for the Z 1013 or GDR-made microcomputers in general. Many magazines such as Funkamateur, Jugend + Technik [de], MP Mikroprozessortechnik and practic regularly published news, reports, handicraft instructions for self-construction of additional hardware or upgrading, and conversion of computers as well as programs for typing. Hannes Gutzer and Gerd Hutterer wrote brochure BASIC with the Z 1013, which was published by VEB Robotron-Electronics Riesa.

Even after German reunification, the exchange of experience within advocates for GDR computer technology continued in publications with small circulation, and from late 1990s, also in Internet forums, up to the creation of corresponding emulators.

== Emulation ==
After the end of the home computer era in the early 1990s and with the advent of powerful and affordable computer technology in mid-1990s, dedicated enthusiasts increasingly developed programs for emulating home computers and their peripherals. A single modern system with images from relevant programs is sufficient to play old classics from a wide variety of home computers with the help of emulators. Among other things, the emergence of emulators triggered an increased transfer of otherwise lost software to modern storage media, which is an important contribution to the preservation of digital culture.

The emulator package JKCEMU, which runs under Windows and Linux, was developed to emulate GDR microcomputers, in particular the Z 1013.

== Reception ==
=== Contemporary ===
In contrast to computers of the KC series, the Z 1013 was available even to private consumers - but only after ordering, a long waiting time and personal pickup in Erfurt or Riesa. The reason for restricted distribution was the refusal of the state-owned distribution network to sell the Z 1013 kit on the grounds that a computer kit will encounter too little interest in the population.

From state-controlled magazines such as Radio Fernsehen Elektronik and Funkamateur, the appearance of the computer, however, was welcomed: "As close to the hardware [relative to KC 85/1], a reasonably priced and well documented system", perfectly suited to the "experimental appropriation of skills in the field of applied microcomputer technology". At the same time, however, it was critically noted that initially it came with a BASIC incompatible to that on Z 9001 and KC 85/1 models, there were incompatibilities of the cassette interface for differently clocked variants, and especially that the membrane keyboard was unusable for prolonged text input as "the weak point of the Z 1013". Overall, the Z 1013 was classified as useful device "for electronics amateurs, beginners and advanced users, radio amateurs and societal users with teaching and training background".

The popularity of the computers in the population manifested itself in a variety of organized computer clubs with frequently held local meetings, up to high-traffic national meetings that were held annually and served, for example, to exchange software and experience as well as to set programming standards.

=== Retrospective ===
The computers developed and produced in the GDR, including in particular microcomputers and [chess] game machines, have been increasingly noticed in the media - above all on the Internet - and also are exhibited in dedicated museums. The Z 1013 is characterized as an in-house development based on Western single-board computers, although many individual electronic components such as the U880 microprocessor are copies of Zilog's Western Z80 microprocessor. In contrast to GDR microcomputers from Dresden and Mühlhausen, the Z 1013 was "available in an open design in various variants as consumer good over the entire production period, but without being able to meet demand." The working group at Technische Sammlungen Dresden dealing with the historical reappraisal of Robotron computing technology characterizes the distribution environment of the Z 1013 as follows:

"This relatively inexpensive microcomputer kit therefore was used in the home but also in computer clubs and associations and in a few cases in industry. It was well suited to explore the internal workings of microcomputer technology, to learn programming, to build one's own computer for creative hobby applications and for development of various hardware and software improvements and enhancements." Autor:Klaus-Dieter Weise, product line of home computers, microcomputers and educational computers of VEB Kombinat Robotron

Although the kit was very popular in the GDR, the computers were technologically always about three to five years behind products of Western countries at the time of their appearance: when production of the Z 1013 started in the GDR, there were significantly more powerful and affordable 16-bit systems already available to private households in Western countries.

The German reunification changed the situation abruptly: the sudden free availability of Western home computers resulted in compete decline of demand and therefore in oversupply, despite considerable selling price reductions in 1989 and 1990. Eventually in mid-1990, leftover stock of Z 1013s was scrapped.

== See also ==
- KC 85 – A series of mostly compatible microcomputers made by VEB Mikroelektronik.
- Robotron KC 87 – A series of mostly compatible microcomputers also made by VEB Robotron.
- KC compact – The only pre-assembled home computer made in the GDR aimed at private consumers; not compatible to any of the other KC systems.
- Electronics industry in East Germany
- Economy of East Germany
- History of computer hardware in Eastern Bloc countries
