= Dubna 48K =

Soviet clone of the ZX Spectrum home computer

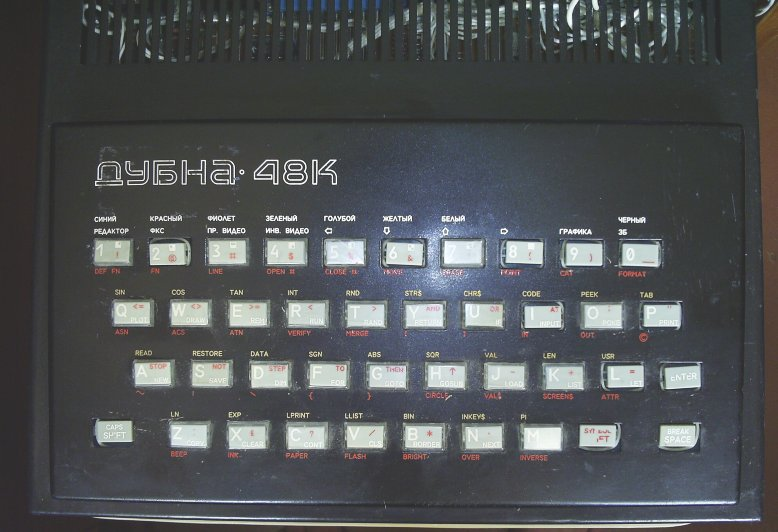
- The Dubna 48K
- Also known as: Дубна 48К
- Manufacturer: TENSOR instrument factory, Dubna, Moscow oblast, USSR
- Type: Home computer
- Released: 1991; 35 years ago
- Operating system: Sinclair BASIC
- CPU: MME 80A (Z80 clone) @ 1.875 MHz
- Memory: 48 KB
- Removable storage: Cassette tape
- Display: SECAM TV or RGB video monitor, 8 colors (RGB)/16 colors (SECAM); text: 32×24 lines, graphics: 256×192 pixels; color attributes: 32x24 cells, two colors per cell.
- Sound: Beeper

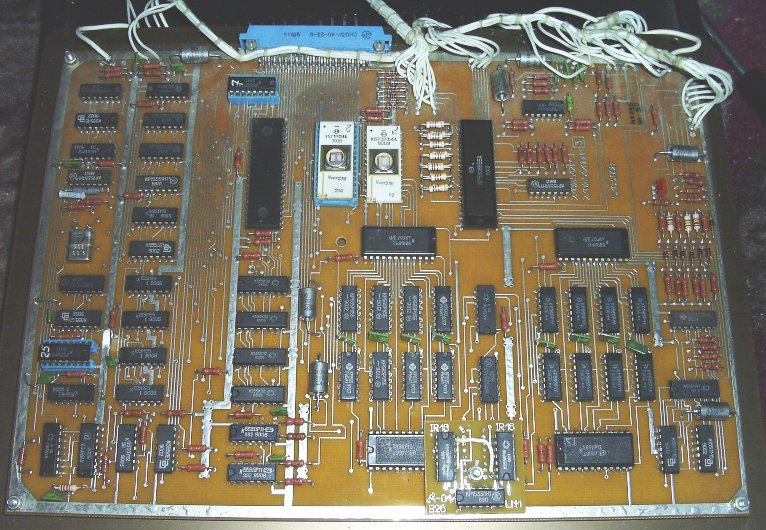
Mainboard

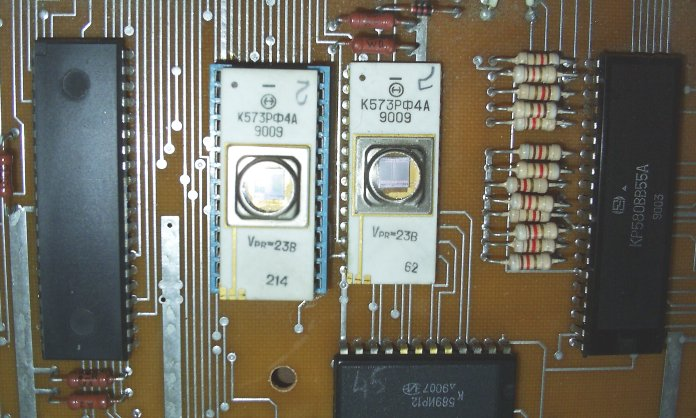
CPU (MME 80A) and ROM (2× К573РФ4А, the two white chips in the middle)

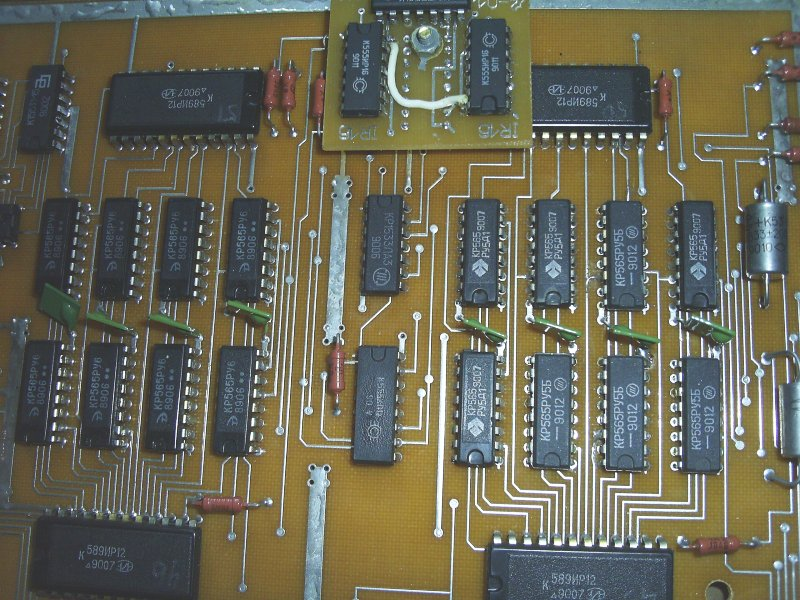
RAM (16× КР565РУ5Г chips)

The Dubna 48K (Дубна 48К) is a Soviet clone of the ZX Spectrum home computer launched in 1991. It was based on an analogue of the Zilog Z80 microprocessor. The Dubna 48k was manufactured in the "TENSOR" instrument factory in Dubna, Moscow Oblast, which still exists to this day.

== Overview ==
According to the manual, this computer was intended for:

- studying the principles of PC operation
- various kinds of calculations
- "intellectual games"

The Dubna 48K had only a built-in BASIC interpreter, and loaded its programs from a cassette recorder. Its BIOS is a modified version of the Sinclair ZX Spectrum ROM, with its tape loading routines modified to account for its slower clock speed. The computer was designed to run at a slower speed as the computer was designed circa 1987-88 during a chip shortage, so they had to resort to using slower RAM and CPU. Because of this, the Dubna-48K is incompatible with certain games and software utilizing custom loading routines.

The machine comes in two versions: in a metal case for the initial 1991 model, and in a plastic case for the 1992 model.

== Included items ==
The Dubna 48K was shipped with the following units:

- Main unit ("data processing unit", as stated on its back side), with mainboard and built-in keyboard
- External power unit
- Video adapter for connecting the computer to a SECAM TV set
- BASIC programming manual
- Reference book, including complete schematic circuit

Additionally, there were some optional items:

- Joystick
- 32 cm (12") color monitor

== Technical details ==
- CPU: 8-bit MME 80A at 1.875 MHz (about 53% the speed of the original ZX Spectrum)
- RAM: 48 KB (16× КР565РУ5Г chips)
- ROM: 16 KB (2× К573РФ4А)
- Resolution: 256 x 192 pixels, or 24 rows of 32 characters each
- Number of colors: 16 colors, 15 effective (there is only one shade of black) in SECAM mode, 8 colors in RGB mode
- Power unit: 5V, 1.7 A
- Dimensions of main unit: 47×320×240 mm

== In culture ==
In the American film Jason Bourne (2016), rogue agent Nicky Parsons uses a "palm-sized authentication device" called Dubna 48K bearing no resemblance to the real Dubna 48K to connect to the mainframe computer of the CIA and exfiltrate information on its black operations. The Agency later finds out that the Dubna 48K unit was reportedly destroyed back in 1993, and its access to the mainframe was never revoked. The Agency did not know that it had actually survived its reported destruction.

== See also ==
- List of ZX Spectrum clones
