= Membrane keyboard =

Type of computer keyboard with pressure pads instead of mechanical keys

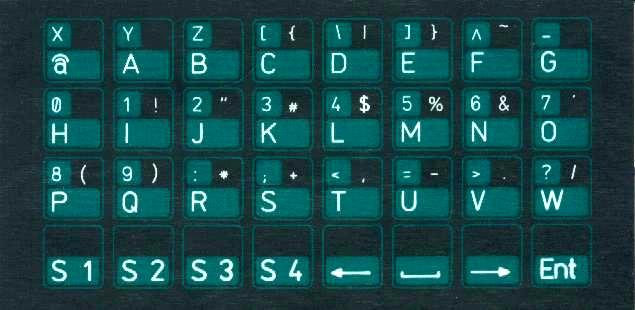
Membrane keyboard as used on the East German Robotron Z1013.

A membrane keyboard is a computer keyboard whose keys are not separate, moving parts, as with the majority of other keyboards, but rather are pressure pads that have only outlines and symbols printed on a flat, flexible surface. Very little tactile feedback is felt when using such a keyboard.

== History ==
Membrane keyboards work by electrical contact between the keyboard surface and the underlying circuits when keytop areas are pressed. These models were used with some early 1980s home computers which lead to greater adoption of the design. The keyboards are inexpensive to produce, and are more resistant against dirt and liquids than some other keyboard types. However, due to a low or non-existent tactile feedback, some people have reported difficulty typing with them, especially when larger numbers of characters are being typed. Chiclet keyboards are a variation of the design.

== Usage ==
Aside from early hobbyist/kit/home computers and some video game consoles, membrane-based QWERTY keyboards are used in some industrial computer systems, and are also found as portable, even "rollable-collapsible" designs for PDAs and other pocket computing devices. Smaller, specialized membrane keyboards, typically numeric-and-a-few-control-keys only, have been used in access control systems (for buildings and restricted areas), simple handheld calculators, domestic remote control keypads, microwave ovens, and other similar devices where the amount of typing is relatively small or infrequent, such as cell phones.

Modern PC keyboards are essentially a membrane keyboard mechanism covered with an array of dome switches which give positive tactile feedback.

== Mechanism ==
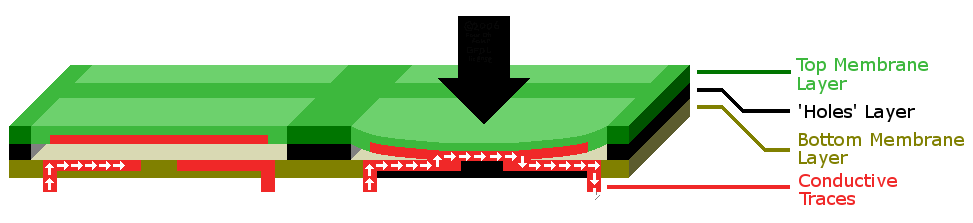
Cross-section diagram of a typical membrane keyboard. The thickness of the bottom three layers has been exaggerated for clarity; in reality, they are not much thicker than pieces of paper or thin cardstock.

The membrane (typically made out of Polyethylene terephthalate or PET) keyboard consists of three layers: two layers containing traces of conductive ink and the center layer is a "spacer" containing holes wherever a two conductive "key" pads count touch upon being pressed. The third layer keeps the other two layers separated in order to prevent short-circuit.

Under normal conditions, the switch (key) is open, because current cannot cross the non-conductive gap between the traces on the bottom layer. However, when the top layer is pressed down (with a finger), it makes contact with the bottom layer. The conductive traces on the underside of the top layer can then bridge the gap, allowing current to flow. The switch is now "closed", and the parent device registers a keypress.

Many applications benefit from the sealed nature of the membrane keypad. Feedback can easily be provided to the user via audible means (e.g. a beep) or visually (lights or via the display itself), or via both means together. For additional wear resistance, a simple, easily replaceable protective clear sheet can be placed in front of the membrane. Membrane keyboards are widely used in consumer electronics, industrial, commercial, scientific and military equipment.

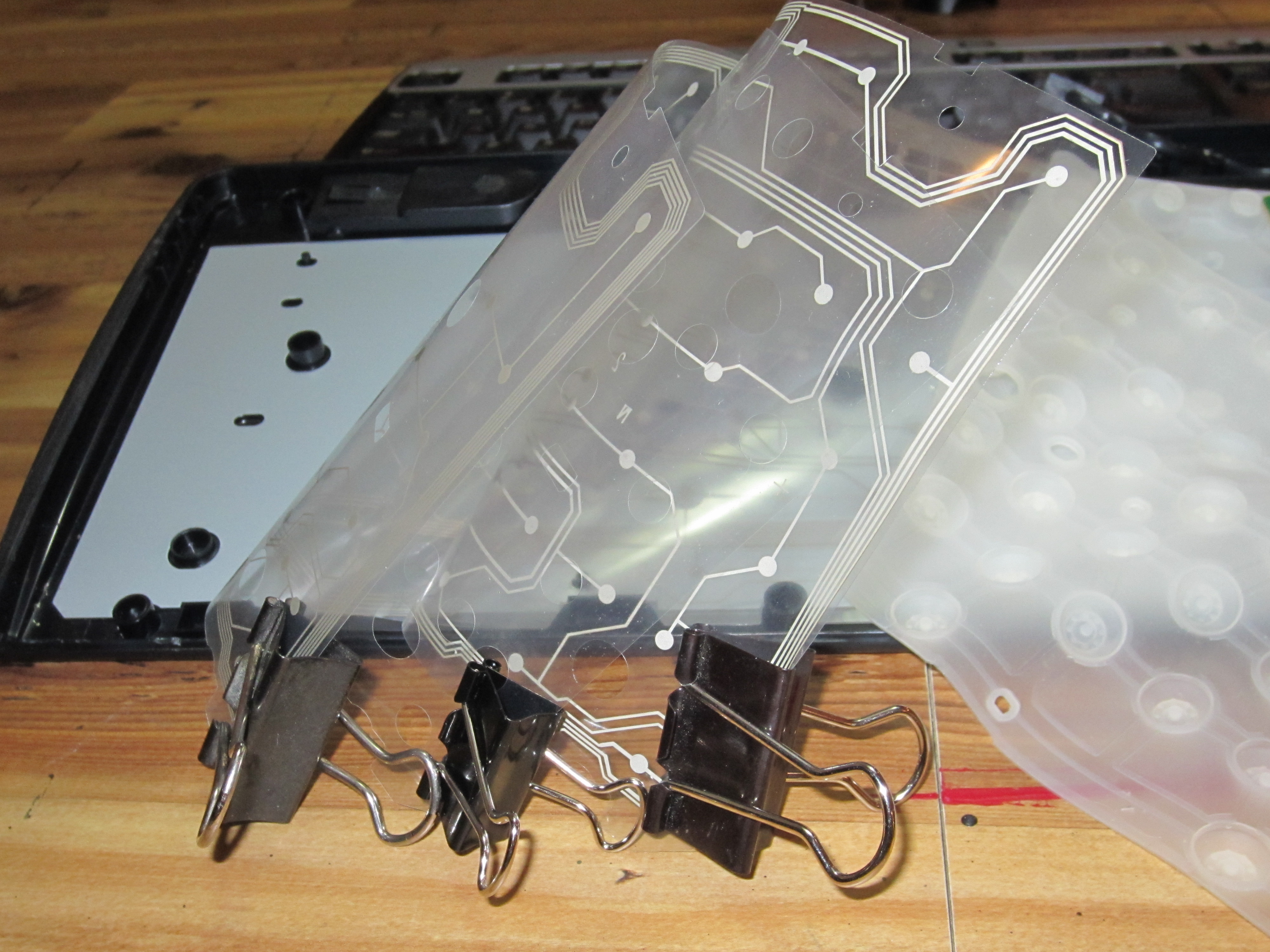
Internal layers of a modern full-travel computer keyboard; bottom contact layer, spacer layer with holes, top contact layer, then elastomer top layer to provide restoring force to keytops.

== See also ==
- Chiclet keyboard
- Keyboard technology
