= Funkamateur =

German amateur radio magazine

- Chefredakteur: Werner Hegewald, DL2RD
- Categories: Amateur radio
- Frequency: Monthly
- Circulation: 34,700
- Publisher: Knut Theurich, DGØZB
- First issue: 1952
- Country: Germany
- Language: German
- Website: funkamateur.de
- ISSN: 0016-2833

Funkamateur (“amateur radio operator”) is a monthly amateur radio enthusiast magazine published in Germany. The magazine is published in German and draws its circulation of 34,700 primarily from Germany, Austria, and Switzerland. The magazine is published twelve times per year with a circulation of 34,700.

Funkamateur traces its roots to the magazine "Sport und Technik", which was published by the former East German organization Gesellschaft für Sport und Technik (Association for Sports and Technology) starting in 1952. In 1954 the section for radio enthusiasts was split off, initially under the title "Sport und Technik, Ausgabe D, Der Funkamateur", which was shortened to "Der Funkamateur" in 1955.

Similar to developments in other countries (e.g. with Byte magazine growing out of the amateur radio magazine 73), Funkamateur played an important role in the East German computer enthusiast scene in the 1980s, publishing numerous computer-related articles such as a series on building a complete computer based on the microprocessor U880.
