= U880 =

8-bit microprocessor

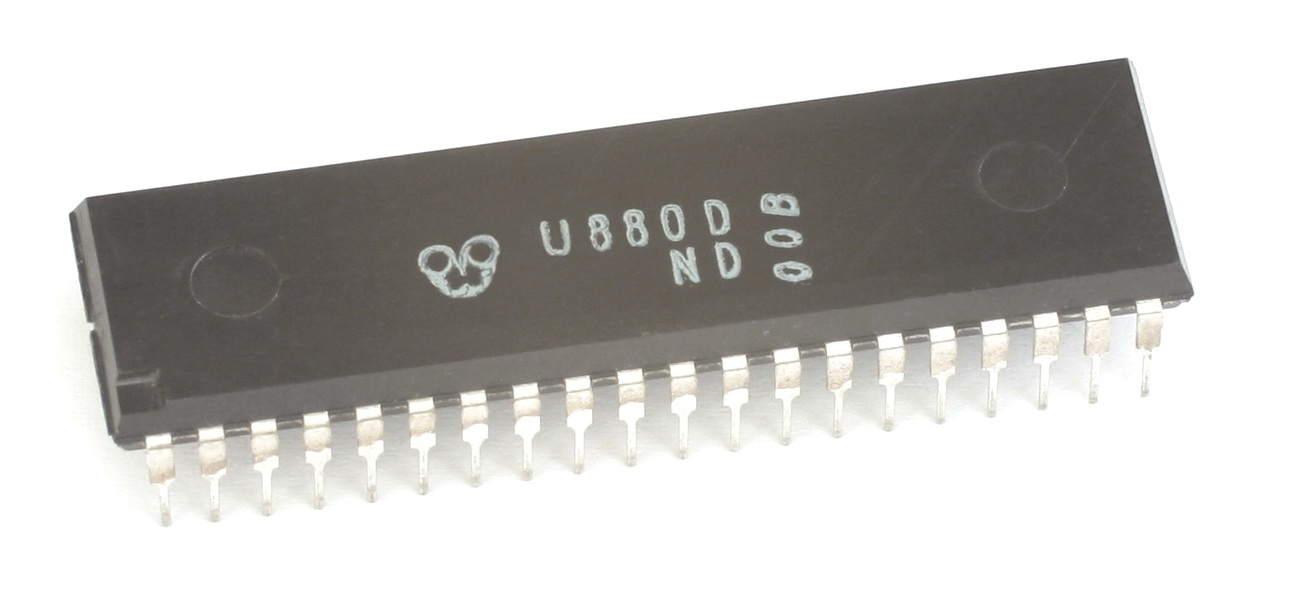
- An early U880D microprocessor, manufactured in December 1981

General information
- Launched: 1980
- Discontinued: c. 1996
- Common manufacturer: VEB Mikroelektronik "Karl Marx" Erfurt

Performance
- Max. CPU clock rate: 1 MHz to 8 MHz

Physical specifications
- Package: DIL40

Architecture and classification
- Instruction set: Zilog Z80

The U880 is an 8-bit microprocessor that was manufactured by VEB Mikroelektronik "Karl Marx" Erfurt (abbreviated as MME; part of Kombinat Mikroelektronik Erfurt) in the German Democratic Republic. Production of the U880 started in 1980 at VEB Funkwerk Erfurt (abbreviated as FWE; the plant was renamed to VEB Mikroelektronik "Karl Marx" in 1983). The U880 is an unlicensed clone of the Zilog Z80 microprocessor, supporting its instruction set as well as its illegal opcodes and bugs, except for very minor differences.

== Processor variants ==
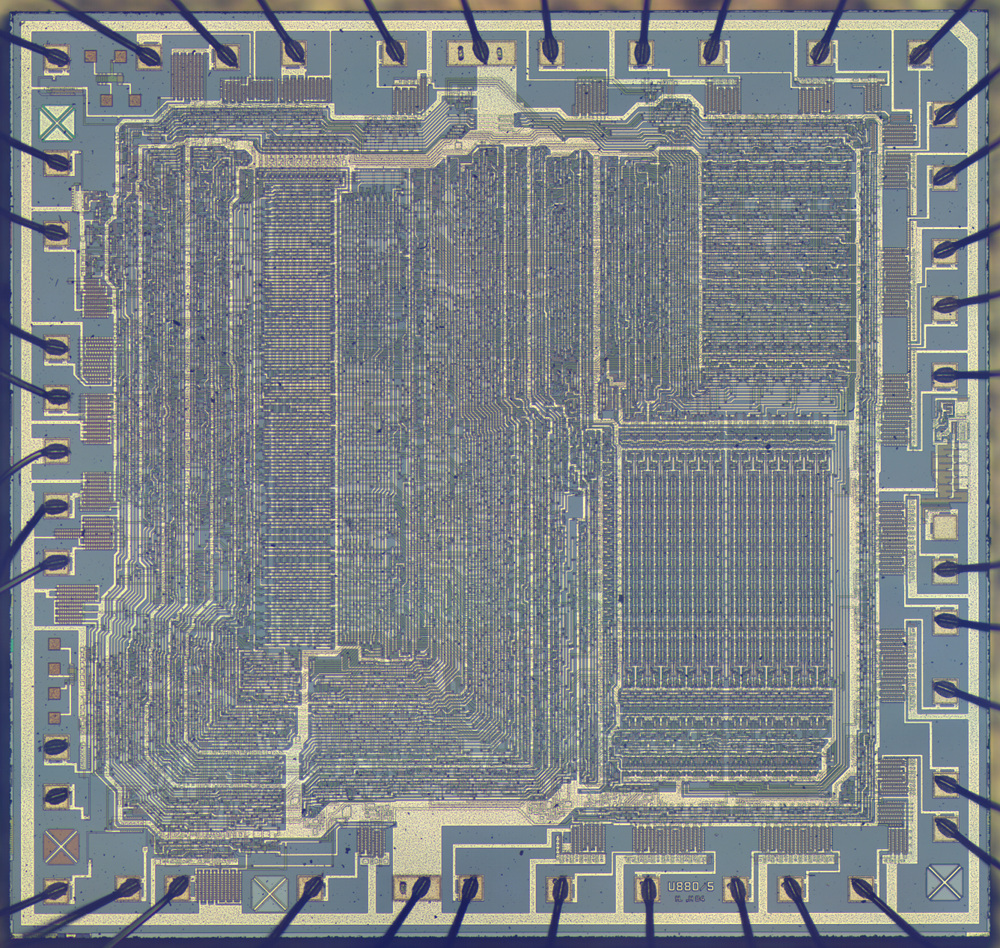
Die shot of the U880; size 4513 μm x 4251 μm (first die shrink 1984); chip inscription at the bottom of the image: "U880/5 HL JH 84"

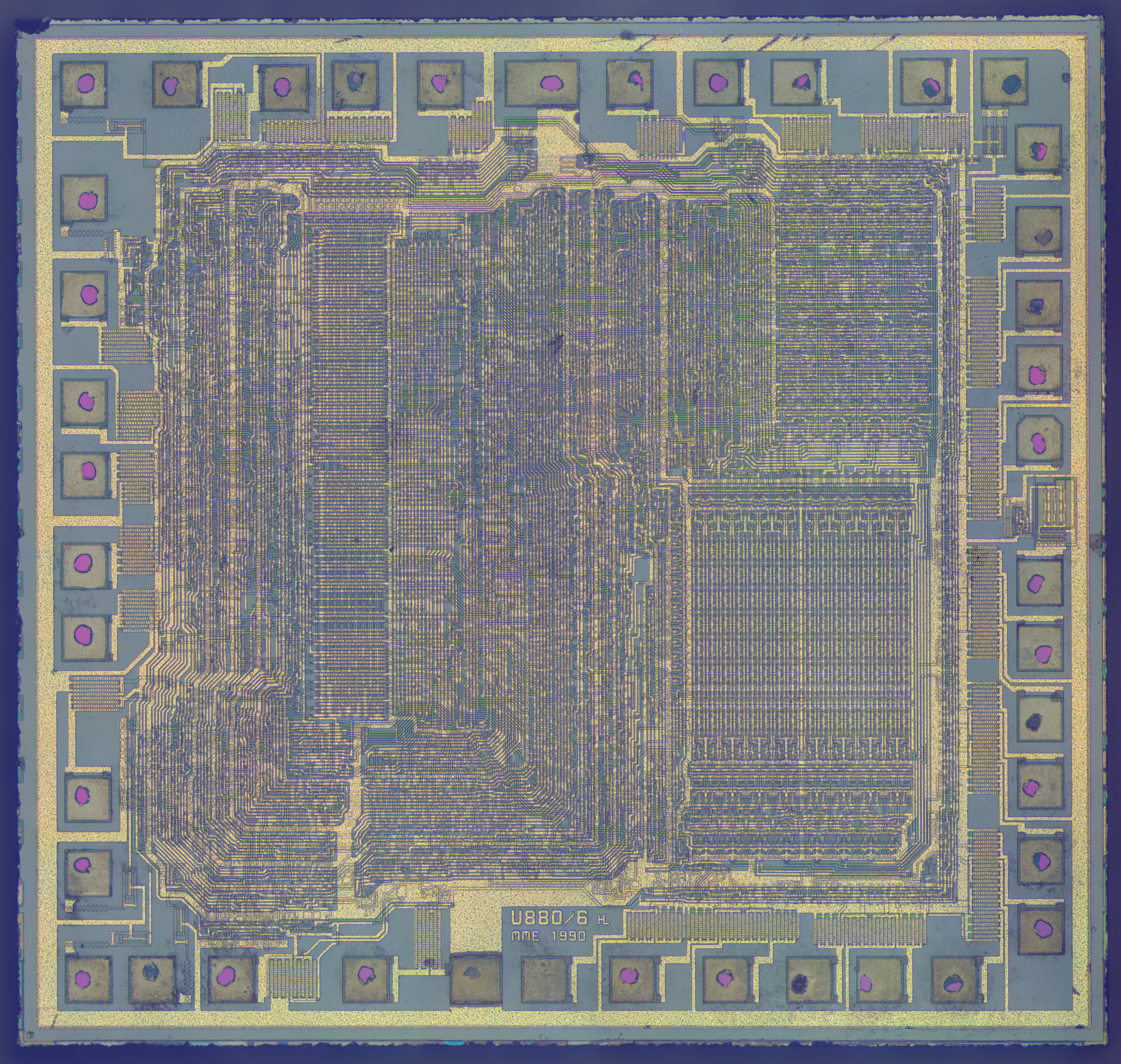
Die shot of the U880; size 3601 μm x 3409 μm (second die shrink 1990); chip inscription at the bottom of the image: "U880/6 HL MME 1990"

The U880 was manufactured in NMOS technology and encased in a plastic DIL40 package with a pin spacing of 2.5 mm (export versions had the Western pin spacing of 2.54 mm; Russian variants also came in a ceramic package).

| Temperature range | Clock rate | Designations |
|---|---|---|
| 0 °C to +40 °C | 1.0 MHz | UD880D, (Note: Out-of-spec, hobbyist version) UB880D S1 |
| 0 °C to +70 °C | 2.5 MHz | U880D, (Note: Original designation when this was the only variant available) UB880D, 80-CPU (Note: Designation for export; 2.54 mm pin spacing) |
| 0 °C to +70 °C | 4.0 MHz | UA880D, 80A-CPU |
| 0 °C to +70 °C | 8.0 MHz | U880DC08, (Note: Manufactured in 1992 by ERMIC) Thesys Z80H (Note: Manufactured after 1992 by Thesys) |
| −25 °C to +85 °C | 2.5 MHz | VB880D |

The military version of the U880 has an additional "MEK 4" marking.

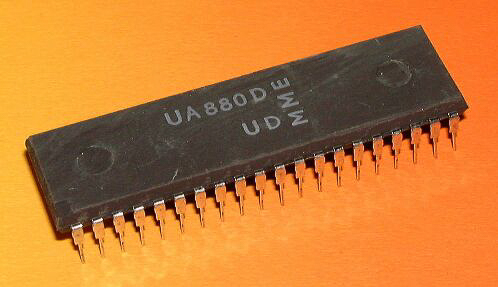
UA880D (1986)

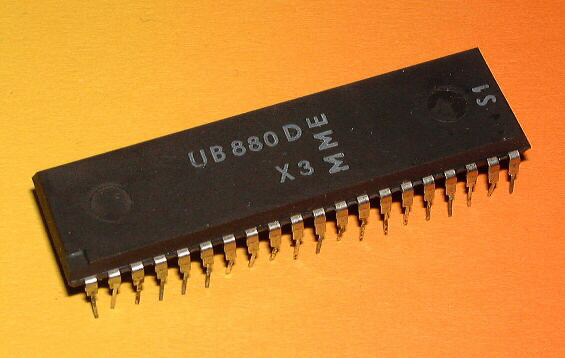
UB880D S1 hobbyist version (1989)

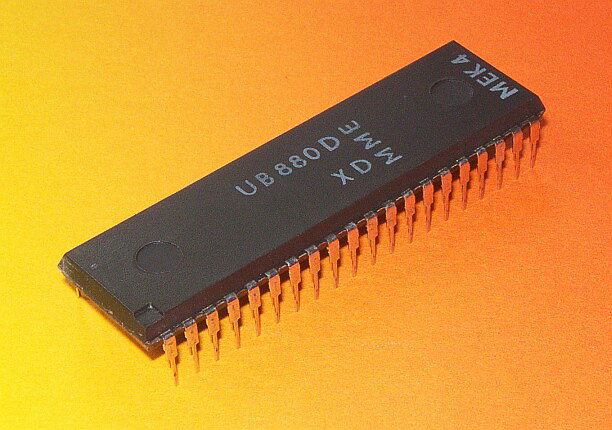
UB880D with military "MEK 4" marking (1989)

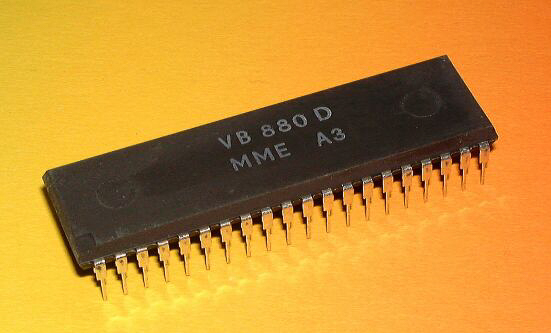
VB880D industrial temperature version (1990)

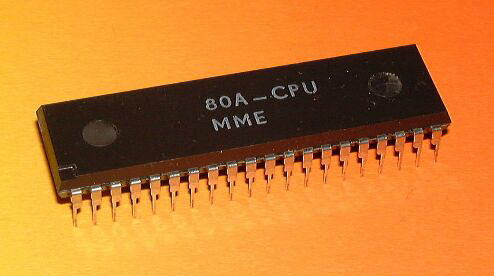
80A-CPU marking for export

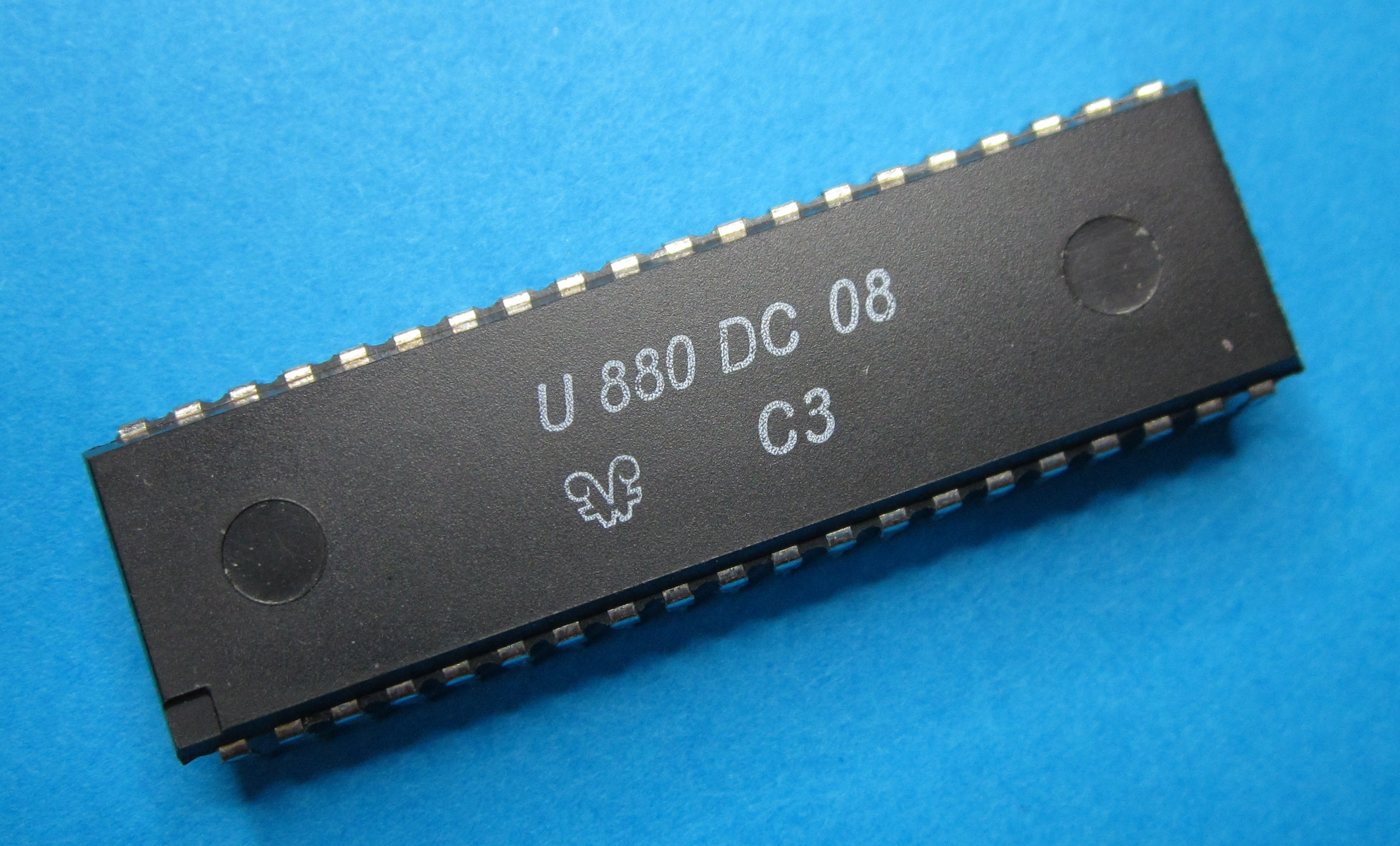
U880DC08 (1992)

== Support chips ==
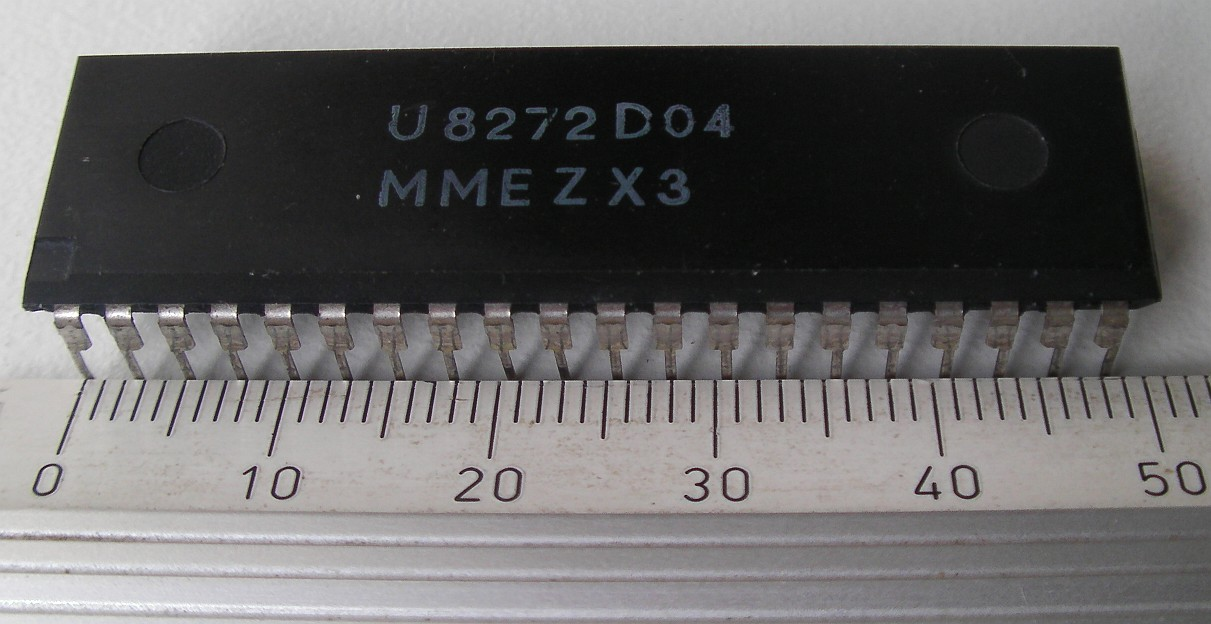
Floppy-disk controller U8272D04 (1989)

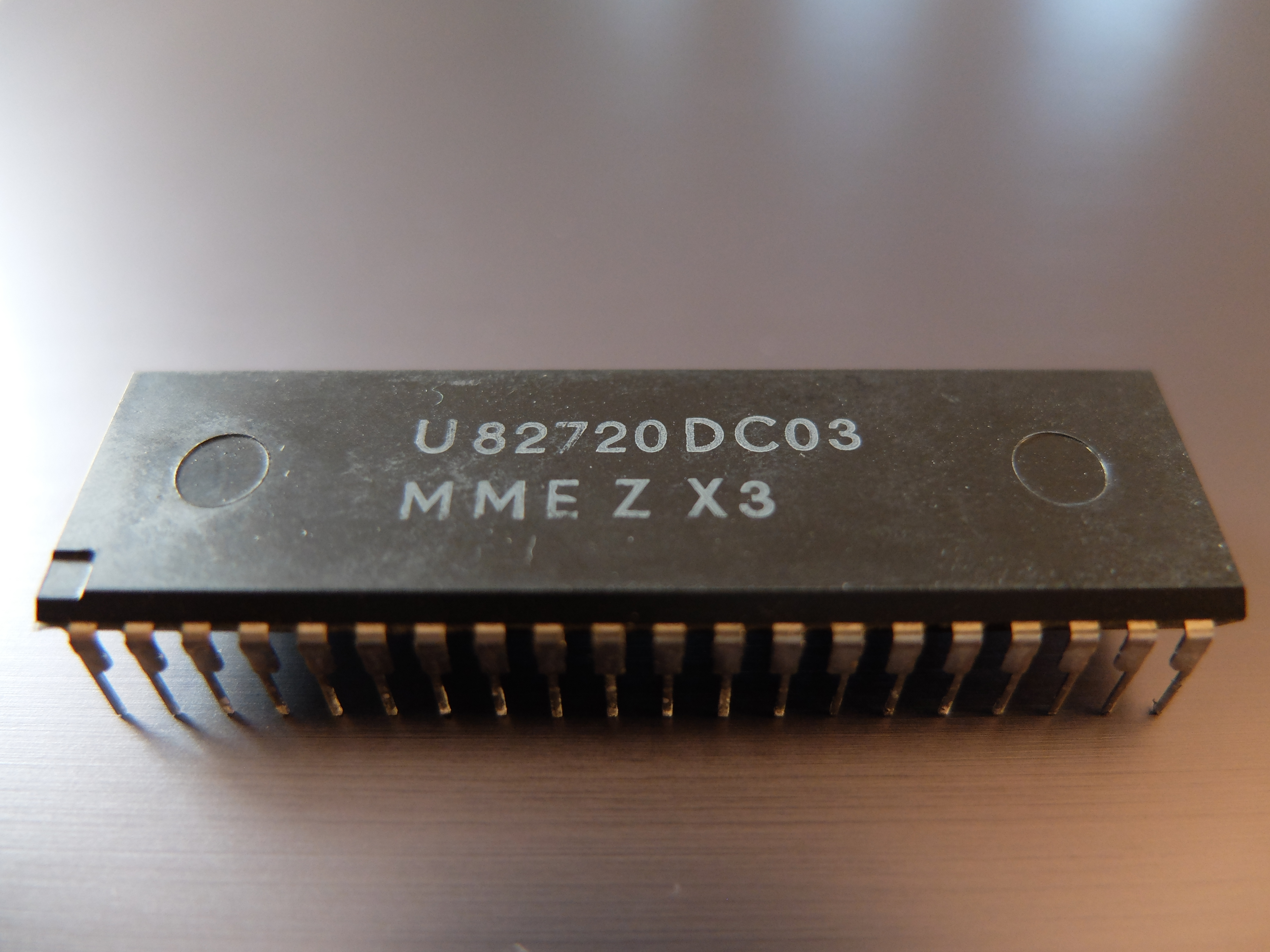
Graphics display controller U82720DC03 (1989)

VEB Mikroelektronik "Karl Marx" also manufactured a number of support chips for the U880. The prefixes UA, UB, VB, 80, and 80A correspond to the same temperature ranges and clock rates as for the processor variants above. Likewise, the suffix S1 indicates the out-of-spec, hobbyist version.

| Designation | International equivalent | Description |
|---|---|---|
| U855D, (Note: Original designation when this was the only variant available) UA855D, UB855D, UD855D, (Note: Out-of-spec, hobbyist version) VB855D, UB855D S1, 80-PIO, (Note: Designation for export; 2.54 mm pin spacing) 80A-PIO | Zilog Z80 PIO | parallel input/output |
| U8560D, UA8560D, UB8560D, VB8560D, UB8560D S1, 80-SIO/0, 80A-SIO/0 | Zilog Z80 SIO/0 | serial input/output |
| U857D, UA857D, UB857D, VB857D, UB857D S1, 80-CTC, 80A-CTC | Zilog Z80 CTC | counter/timer circuit |
| UA858D, UB858D, UB858D S1, 80-DMA, 80A-DMA | Zilog Z80 DMA | DMA controller |
| U8561D, UB8561D | Zilog Z80 SIO/1 | serial input/output |
| UA8563D, UB8563D, VB8563D, UB8563D S1, 80-DART, 80A-DART | Zilog Z80 DART | dual asynchronous receiver/transmitter |
| U8272D04, U8272D08 | Intel 8272 | floppy-disk controller |
| U82530DC04, U82530DC06 | Zilog SCC | serial communications controller |
| U82536DC04 | Zilog CIO | counter/timer and parallel input/output |
| U82720DC02, U82720DC03, U82720DC04 | Intel 82720 | graphics display controller |

== Applications ==
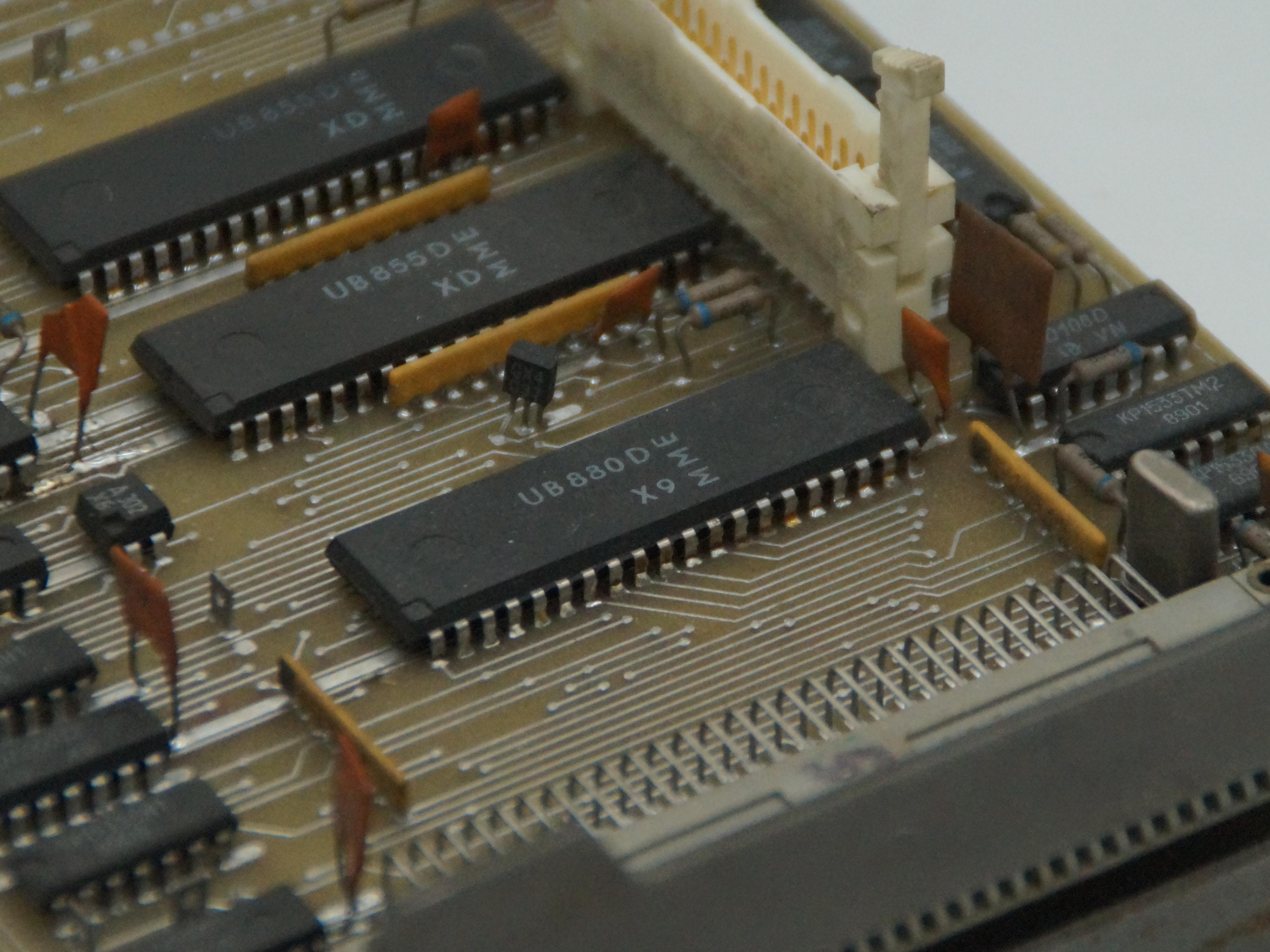
U880D on the motherboard of a Robotron S6120 typewriter

The U880 was by far the most widely used microprocessor in the German Democratic Republic. Examples are:

- office computers A 5120, PC 1715 (both by VEB Robotron), the 1715 used a second U880 just for the keyboard.
- home computers KC 85, KC compact (both by VEB Mikroelektronik "Wilhelm Pieck" Mühlhausen), KC 87, Z1013 (both by VEB Robotron), LC80 by Kombinat Mikroelektronik Erfurt
- arcade game Poly Play (by VEB Polytechnik)

At the time the U880 was the most advanced 8-bit processor available in the Eastern Bloc. Only clones of the Intel 8080 were manufactured in Poland, Czechoslovakia, Hungary, Romania, and the Soviet Union. As the Z80 replaced the Intel 8080 in the West, the U880 was used throughout the Eastern Bloc. Examples are:

- Poland: home computers Mera-Elzab Meritum, Elwro 700 Solum, Elwro 800 Junior, MIK CA80
- Czechoslovakia: home computers Didaktik Gama, Tesla Ondra
- Hungary: home computer Microkey Primo
- Romania: home computers Electromagnetica JET, ITCI MicroTIM, ICE-Felix HC-85, Feper Junior
- Bulgaria: office computer ISOT-1031C
- Soviet Union: home computer Dubna 48K

== Further development ==
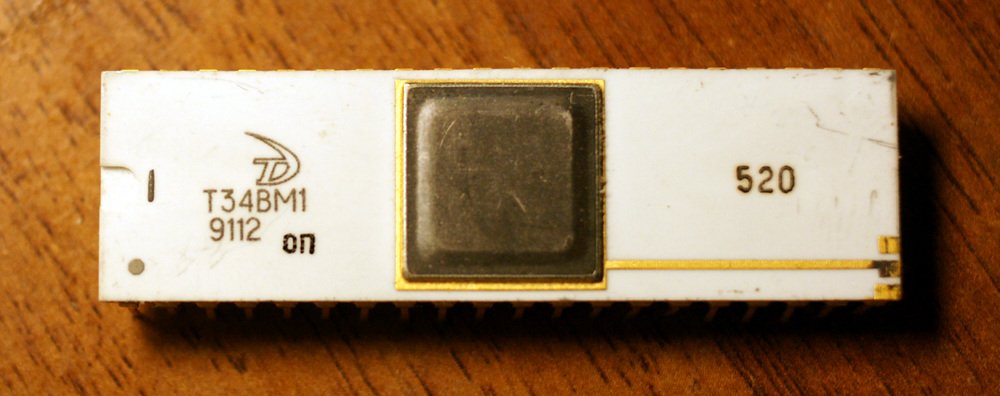
Microprocessor T34VM1 (Angstrem Zelenograd, 1991)

Following the example of Zilog where the Z80 was succeeded by the 16-bit processors Z8001 / Z8002, VEB Mikroelektronik "Karl Marx" produced the U8001 / U8002. And just like its Western counterpart, the U8001 / U8002 saw far less use than the U880. When MS-DOS emerged as the dominant operating system for personal computers, in the Eastern Bloc the only available clone of the Intel 8086 was the Soviet K1810VM86. VEB Mikroelektronik "Karl Marx" then proceeded to develop a clone of the Intel 80286, the U80601. Furthermore, a CMOS version of the Z80 was developed with the designation U84C00. Due to the economic changes following the German reunification in 1990, neither project proceeded beyond pilot production. VEB Mikroelektronik "Karl Marx" (MME) was privatized in 1990 under the name ERMIC GmbH, a large part of which became Thesys Gesellschaft für Mikroelektronik mbH in 1992. Both ERMIC and Thesys continued to manufacture the NMOS version of the U880, ERMIC still with the MME name and logo, Thesys under its new name. A die shrink chip with the marking U880/6 had been developed in 1990 and went into production some time after that. The smaller chip allowed clock rates up to 8 MHz for the U880DC08 and Thesys Z80H. While Zilog likely could have taken up legal action against the successors of VEB Mikroelektronik "Karl Marx" for copyright infringement, they recruited Thesys as a Zilog distributor instead.

From about 1991 until 1993, bare U880 chips were sold to Russian and Ukrainian companies and packaged there. Initially the U880/5 chip revision was labelled as 80A-CPU and T34VM1 (Russian: Т34ВМ1). Later integrated circuits with U880/6 chips inside received the official designation KR1858VM1 (Russian: КР1858ВМ1) for the plastic package and KM1858VM1 (Russian: КМ1858ВМ1) for the ceramic package. Manufacturers include Angstrem Zelenograd, Kvazar Kiev, and VZPP Voronesh.
