= PMI-80 =

Single board microcomputer

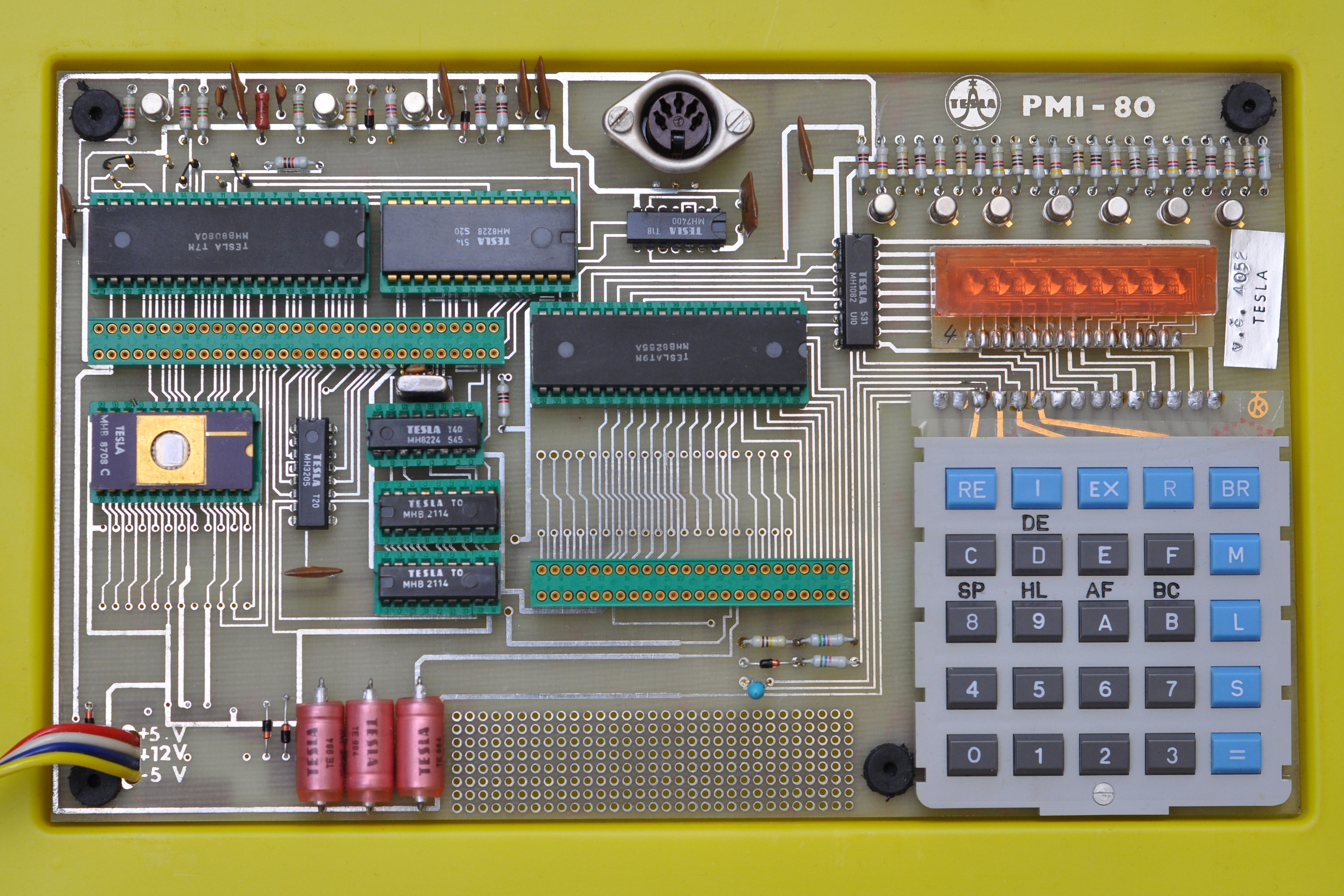
PMI-80 board

The PMI-80 was a single-board microcomputer produced by Tesla Piešťany, Czechoslovakia, since 1982. It was based on the MHB 8080A CPU (a Tesla clone of the Intel 8080), clocked at 1.111 MHz. Instead of a raster graphic display output and classical keyboard, it had a calculator-style nine-digit seven-segment red LED display and a 25-key calculator-type keypad with hexadecimal and function keys (including hardware REset and Interrupt). The PMI-80 had 1 KiB of ROM (expandable to 2 KiB) and fixed 1 KiB of RWM. Eight (expandable to 32) I/O lines were provided for user along with complete system bus. Connected could be e.g., a card with a DAC of 0–12 V range.
