= Bernard Dixon =

British science journalist (1938–2020)

Bernard Dixon OBE, FIBiol
- Born: 17 July 1938
- Died: 30 October 2020 (aged 82)
- Occupation: science journalist
- Employers: New Scientist; American Society for Microbiology

Dr Bernard Dixon OBE, FIBiol (17 July 1938 – 30 October 2020) was a British science journalist, who was editor of New Scientist from 1969 to 1979.

== Early life and education ==
Dixon was born on 17 July 1938 in Darlington, County Durham. His parents were Grace (née Peirson) and Ronald Dixon. His father worked in an electrical shop. He attended the Queen Elizabeth Grammar School, Darlington, and then studied biology at King's College, Newcastle upon Tyne, later Newcastle University. He gained a PhD in microbiology and briefly worked as a researcher.

== Career ==
His first editorial post was on World Medicine, a magazine aimed at GPs. He joined the New Scientist in 1968, and served as its editor from 1969 to 1979. Under his editorship, the magazine reported on science and technology developments for a non-specialist reader, and Dixon expanded its focus to cover environmental issues as well as UK science policy. In 1969, he commissioned a Westminster Diary column from the MP Tam Dalyell, which was published for 36 years. Another long-running feature commissioned by Dixon was the Grimbledon Down cartoon strip from Bill Tidy, which lampooned the secret government research institute Porton Down. New Scientist's circulation increased nearly twofold during this period.

Dixon subsequently worked as a freelance science editor and writer. He was European Editor for the American Society for Microbiology from 1997. He wrote columns for Current Biology from 2000 and for Lancet Infectious Diseases from 2001.

He was a member of the European Federation of Biotechnology's Task Group on Public Perceptions of Biotechnology. He served on committees for bodies such as the British Association for the Advancement of Science, the Council for Science and Society and the Committee for the Scientific Investigation of Claims of the Paranormal. In 1974, with his colleague Joseph Hanlon, he investigated Uri Gellar, showing that his ability to bend metal objects was not paranormal. Dixon campaigned on issues such as the risk of antibiotic resistance from use of the drugs in cattle to promote growth.

He wrote several books, including What Is Science For? (1973) and Beyond the Magic Bullet (1978). He was the general editor of an anthology From Creation to Chaos: Classic Writings in Science (1989).

== Personal life ==
Dixon was married to Margaret Charlton (1963–88); the couple had three children. The marriage ended in divorce. His partner subsequently was Kath Adams, a secretary at the New Scientist; she died in 2019.

Dixon died on 30 October 2020. A tribute by his successor at New Scientist, Michael Kenward, appeared in the issue dated 5 December 2020.

== Awards and honours ==
Dixon received the Institute of Biology's Charter Award for services to biology; and the Biochemical Society Award (shared with Steven Rose) "for scientific communication in the public domain" in 2002. The University of Edinburgh awarded him an honorary DSc in 1996 "for contributions to public debate on scientific issues."

He was made an Officer of the Order of the British Empire (OBE) in the 2000 Birthday Honours for services to science journalism.

He gave the 2003 Erasmus Darwin Memorial Lecture, entitled "Why Modify Genes?"
