= Jacek Karpiński =

Polish computer scientist (1927-2010)

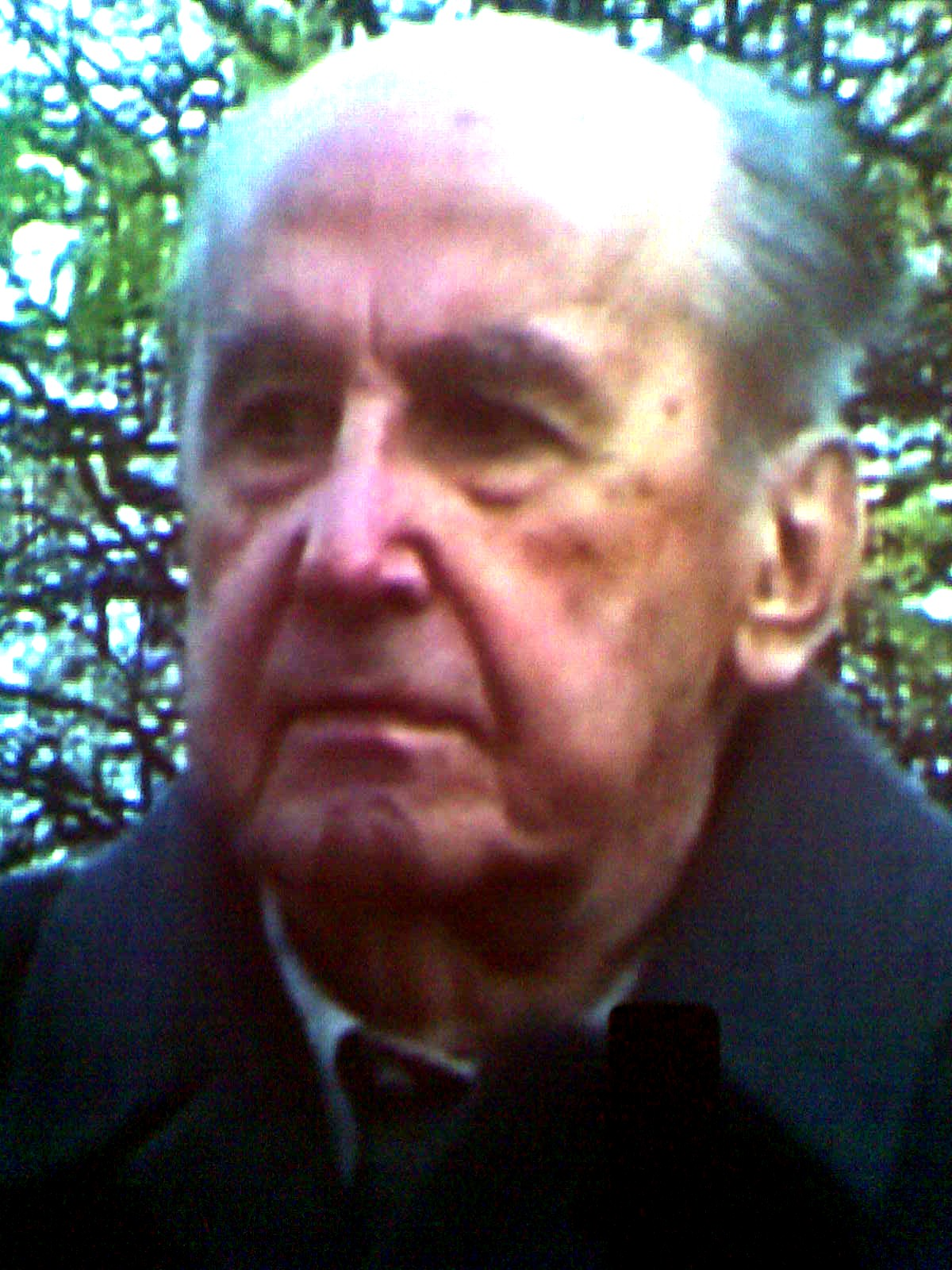
- Born: April 9, 1927; Turin, Italy
- Died: February 21, 2010 (aged 82); Wrocław, Poland
- Occupations: Electronics, cybernetics and programming engineer
- Awards: Commander's Cross Polonia Restituta Officer's Cross Polonia Restituta Cross of Valou (3 times)

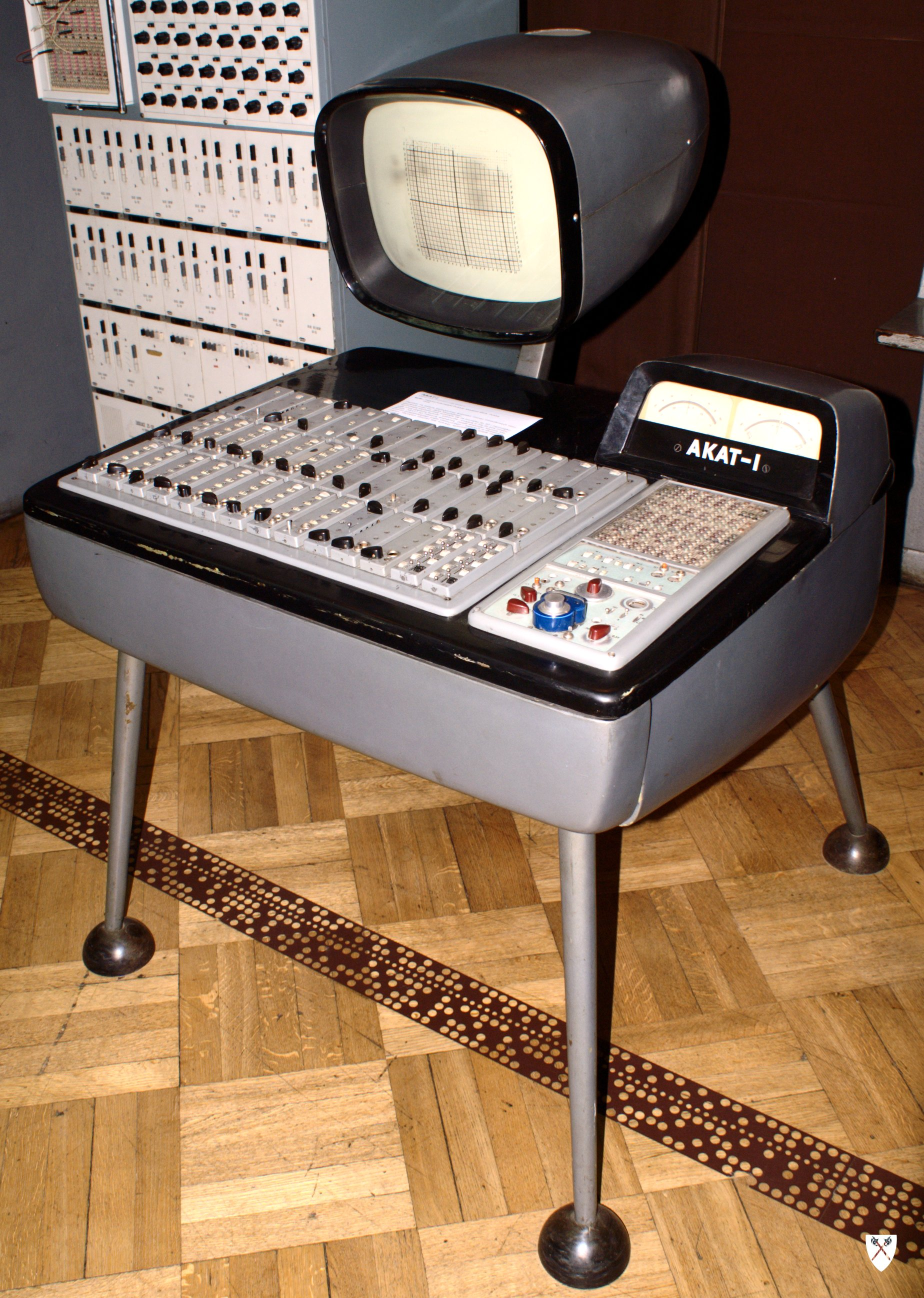
The AKAT-1

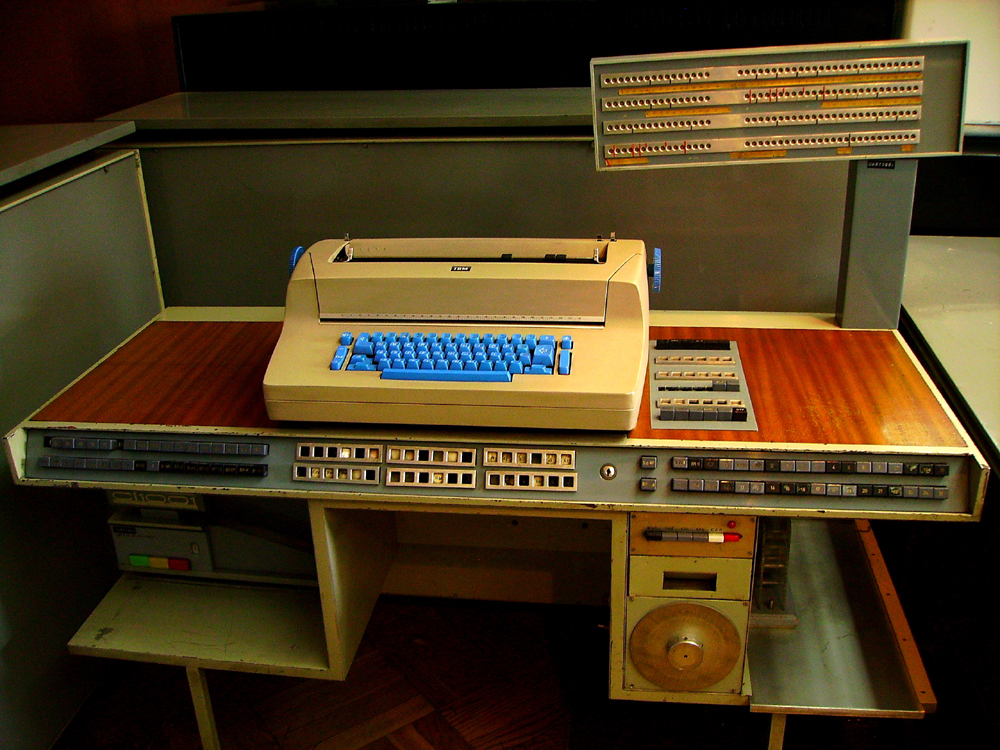
KAR-65

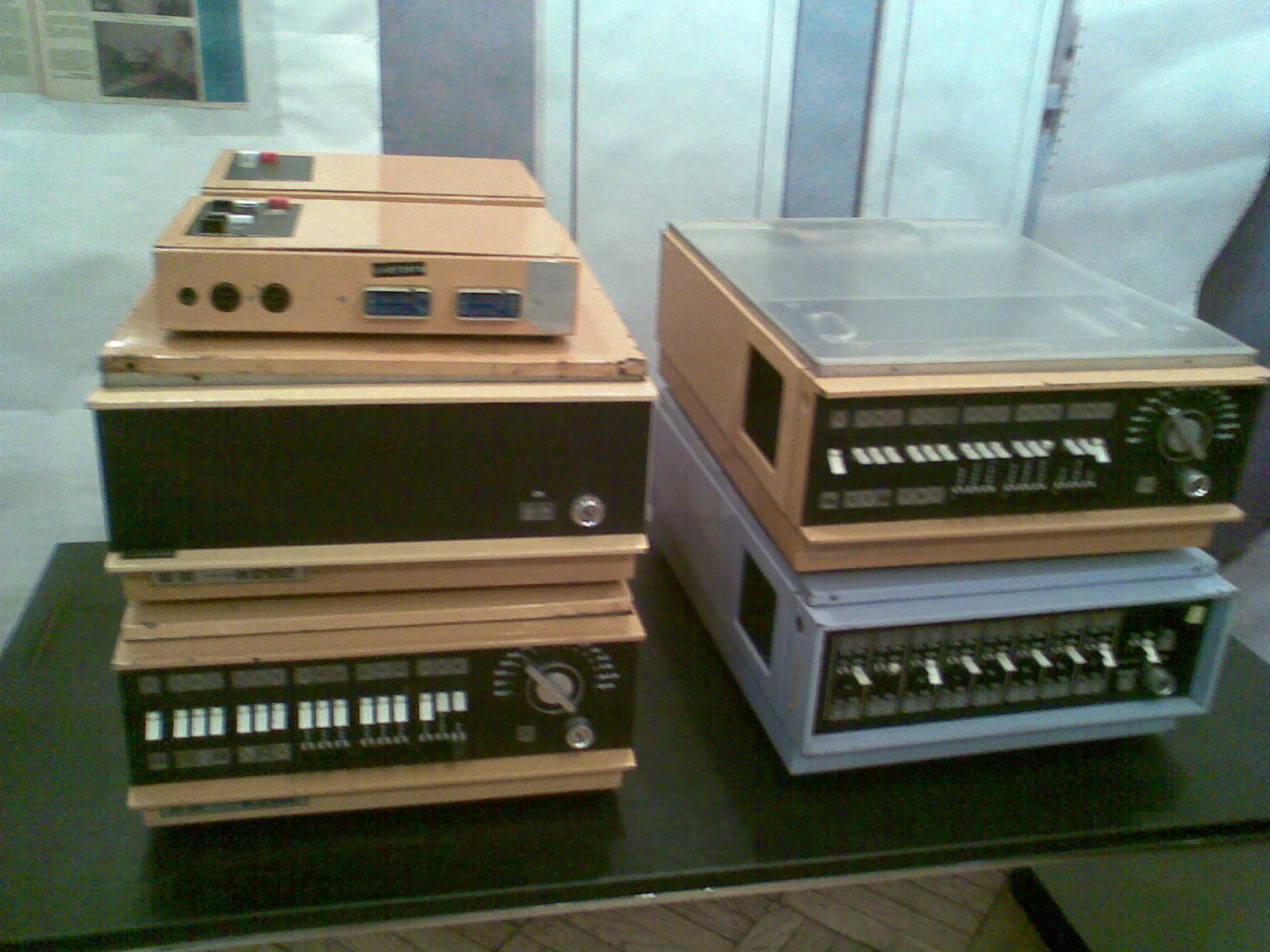
K-202 with peripherals

Jacek Karpiński (9 April 1927 – 21 February 2010) was a Polish pioneer in computer engineering and computer science.

During World War II, he was a soldier in the Batalion Zośka of the Polish Home Army, and was awarded multiple times with a Cross of Valour. He took part in Operation Kutschera (intelligence) and the Warsaw Uprising, where he was heavily wounded.

Later, he became a developer of one of the first machine learning algorithms, techniques for character and image recognition.

After receiving a UNESCO award in 1960, he travelled for several years around the academic centres in the United States, including MIT, Harvard, Caltech, and many others.

In 1971, he designed one of the first minicomputers, the K-202. Because of the policy on computer development in the People's Republic of Poland, belonging to the Comecon that time, the K-202 was never mass-produced.

Karpiński later became a pig farmer, and in 1981, after receiving a passport, emigrated to Switzerland.

He also founded the Laboratory for Artificial Intelligence of the Polish Academy of Sciences in the early 1960s.

== Family and childhood ==
Jacek Karpiński was born on 9 April 1927 in Turin, Italy into a family of Polish intellectuals and alpinists. His father, Adam 'Akar' Karpiński, was a prominent aeronautic engineer (who co-constructed the SL-1 Akar, the first glider constructed entirely by the Poles) and inventor, credited with projects of innovative climbing equipment (crampons, 'Akar-Ramada' tent). His mother, Wanda Czarnocka-Karpińska, was a respected physician who went on to become Dean of the University of Physical Education in Warsaw. Both were pioneers of winter mountaineering in the Tatra Mountains (first successful winter attacks on Banówka, Nowy Wierch, Lodowy Szczyt and others). Adam Karpiński was also a member of a Polish expedition into the Andes, which was the first to climb the peak Mercedario (6720 m.). Karpiński himself was due to be born in the Vallot winter hut near Mont Blanc, but due to the extreme weather conditions, his parents had to retreat to Turin, where their first child was born.

Karpiński had one younger brother, Marek, who also became an electrical engineer. The family moved from Biała Podlaska to Warsaw in 1934, where Wanda took a job at Physical University of Warsaw and Adam worked in PZL (Polish Aviation Works). Karpiński's father died in September 1939 during an expedition to Nanda Devi in the Himalayas. After an unsuccessful attack on the summit, along with Stefan Bernadzikiewicz, he decided to climb the nearby Tirsuli (7039m), where both were killed by an avalanche.

== Wartime ==
Karpiński's life was changed not only by his father's death but by the outbreak of World War II. Despite his young age (fourteen at the time), by pretending to be seventeen, he managed to join the Gray Ranks, a Polish underground paramilitary boy scouts organization, where he served in Grupy Szturmowe (Assault Groups).

In early 1943, he was severely injured while working on homemade bombs for an underground sabotage operation when one of them accidentally exploded in the basement of his house. He lost sight in both eyes and faced the serious threat of hand-amputation. After his mother's intervention and the help of her fellow physicians, his eyes recovered fully and the hand was saved, but he never regained total control over it. After the recovery, Karpiński resumed his activities in the Home Army.

With the help of his mother, Wanda, and brother, Marek, who both also actively participated in the resistance effort, the family established a secret resistance outpost in their family home on Obserwatorów Street. The place was an outpost for Juliusz "Laudański" Deczkowski's unit and contained a clandestine shooting range. It was also a hideout for Stanisław Miedza-Tomaszewski, a Home Army officer working for its Informational Department.

Karpiński participated in numerous field operations, including Sieczychy Operation (Akcja pod Sieczychami), as a soldier, and Operation Kutschera, as a part of recon under Wiesław Krajewski. After the formation of the Home Army's Zośka battalion, Karpiński enrolled, where he befriended poet Krzysztof Kamil Baczyński, both being commanders of smaller sub-units.

Karpiński also participated in the Warsaw Uprising. On the first day of fighting, he was trapped weaponless with around 30 other soldiers in a hospital building on Koszykowa street after the weaponry supply had been mistakenly directed somewhere else. While evacuating the unit, Karpiński's group was caught under heavy fire, which resulted in most of the evacuees dead. Karpiński himself was shot with a 9mm caliber gun – a bullet was stuck in his backbone but he survived. Found next day by the hospital's nurses, he received treatment but remained paralyzed. Released from hospital after the Uprising's collapse, he rejoined his family in Pruszków but remained unable to stand or walk. The family moved through Kraków and Zakopane to a small village of Murzasichle in the Tatras, where they remained through the rest of the war. During the course of the war, Karpiński was awarded the Cross of Valour three times.

== Post-war ==
After World War II, Karpiński's family moved to Radomsko, and he started to attend local high school. He was forced to learn how to walk again, which he did during hiking trips in the mountains with his brother and Józef Lityński. He completed the entire high school curriculum in one year and passed the baccalaureate with flying colours. Afterwards, Karpiński moved to Łódź to begin university education at the Faculty of Electro-Mechanical Sciences within the local polytechnic. After two years, he moved to Warsaw University of Technology from which he graduated in 1951.

In his first years of work he experienced some minor vexations from communist security services (Urząd Bezpieczeństwa), due to his past in the Home Army. Karpiński, just as many other former Zośka battalion veterans, influenced by former Home Army high officer Jan "Radosław" Mazurkiewicz's call, revealed himself to the Communists, but unlike many, he was spared imprisonment. Nevertheless, he was forced to change workplace several times, eventually receiving a work warrant for T-12 factory of electrical components in Żerań. During the time Karpiński was planning to flee Poland, he even worked on designing a mini-submarine in which he would be able to cross the Baltic Sea and reach the Danish island of Bornholm. However, after the first sights of the Polish thaw, he decided to stay. In 1955 he was offered a job at the Polish Academy of Sciences' Institute of Basic Problems, which he accepted. There he worked under Leszek Filipkowski on the design of the prototype ultrasonography device.

== AAH ==
His first independent project was the AAH — Analytical Analyzer of Harmonics. Karpiński was asked by a long-time friend, Józef Lityński, an employee of the State Institute of Hydrology and Meteorology, whom he had known from his time in Radomsko, to build a device to help calculate Fourier integrals. The Institute hoped the device could help improve the effectiveness of long-term weather forecasts. Karpiński gathered a team of five people and constructed a computer based on vacuum tubes in 1957. The machine had been used for two years when it was accidentally destroyed. Karpiński himself claimed AAH raised the precision of forecasts by 10%, an estimate which has not been contested. A part of the engineering team was Karpiński's brother Marek, who worked with him successfully until his tragic death in 1957 during a climbing expedition in the Tatras.

== AKAT-1 ==
The breakthrough achievement of Karpiński's career was the construction of AKAT-1 in 1959 in co-operation with engineer Janusz Tomaszewski. AKAT-1 was a pioneering work – the world's first differential equations analyzer based on transistors. Karpiński built the device during his spell at the Polish Academy of Science's Institute of Automatics, where he found employment after the success of AAH. The aim of AKAT-1 was to simulate various complex dynamic processes like heat transfer or a shock absorber's mechanics. The innovativeness of the device was acknowledged by historians of computer science – e.g. Maciej Sysło claims it has to be conceded that Karpiński's effort preceded any other similar device. The construction was also lauded for its aesthetical merits – the panel designed by leading Polish artists – Emil Cieślar, Olgierd Rutkowski, Stanisław Siemek and Andrzej Wróblewski had been considered to 'innovatively merge all functions in a congruent and attractive form that anticipated the future trends'. The machine has been domestically welcomed warmly, having been covered by a host of country-wide media, including national television TVP1 and Polish Film Chronicle.

Currently, the machine can be seen in the Museum of Technology in Warsaw.

== UNESCO scholarship in the United States ==
The success of AKAT-1 enabled Karpiński to be put forward by Poland as its candidate for the UNESCO worldwide award for young engineers in 1960. Karpiński's work was evaluated with around 200 other contestants by an UNESCO international committee, and he turned out to be among the six laureates. As a reward, he was allowed to go on a half-year scholarship in the United States to visit major technological centres in the country. During the scholarship, which has been eventually extended to a full year, Karpiński managed to visit around twenty universities and laboratories, among them Computation Laboratory at Harvard, Caltech, UCLA and Los Alamos National Laboratory. During his stay he met with a number of leading computer scientists of the time including John Eckert, Claude Shannon and Edward F. Moore. Despite the numerous offers to stay in the United States and move his work there, Karpiński decided to come back to Poland. Later, it emerged that before and during his stay in the United States, Karpiński cooperatated with Polish intelligence to collect data, which sparked controversies around his person. Karpiński himself, interviewed on the matter after the fall of communism, was reluctant to comment the matter, but insisted the agreement with intelligence officer cpt. Zygmunt Goć was limited to reporting on the state of technical progress of American facilities.

== Perceptron ==
Shortly after his return from the US, Karpiński, inspired by his American experience, decided to implement some of his newest ideas at home. He convinced the director of the Institute of Automatics Stefan Węgrzyn to build a perceptron – a device built according to Frank Rosenblatt's ideas, able to learn how to discern and recognize objects and shapes. The idea was successfully realized, and the Polish perceptron was completed in 1964, being one of the first of such in the world and the first known in the Communist bloc.

== KAR-65 ==
Soon after the completion of the perceptron, Karpiński fell out with Węgrzyn, which forced him to leave the Institute of Automatics. He moved to the Polish Academy of Sciences' Institute of Physics led by Jerzy Pniewski. Pniewski's team worked on the analysis of data from CERN – pictures from Glaser bubble chambers, traces of colliding electrons and neutrons. The Institute struggled with the amount of data and was looking for a mechanism to speed up the processing of data. In 1965, on Pniewski's request Karpiński designed a scanner, and after its success, began work on the mathematical machine that could compute the scanned data. With the help of newly formed team of seven people including later long-time cooperators Tadeusz Kupniewski and Teresa Pajkowska, Karpiński finished the machine in 1968, dubbed KAR-65, after three years of work. Due to financial constraints, KAR-65 was built using Polish germanium transistors TG-40 and DOG-61 diodes, considerably slower than their western counterparts. KAR-65 was asynchronic and used a dedicated operation system, designed by Karpiński. The computer could perform 100 thousand operations per second, which made it the fastest Polish computer at the time. The computer consisted of two parts, both measuring 1,7m x 1,4m x 0,4m, but was still considerably smaller than the leading Polish computers of the time, Odra mainframes. The computer's interface was designed by the artist Stanisław Tomaszewski, who had also worked on the AKAT-1. The total cost of construction was estimated to be 6 million zlotys. Only one machine was built and it continued to work in the Institute of Physics for 20 years. It currently resides in the Museum of Technology in Warsaw.

Even though the computer was a technological success, most likely due to the pressure of competing computer manufacturers (chiefly Elwro, producer of Odra mainframes), many reports on KAR-65s were halted by the censorship. Karpiński had his 1969 paper from Polish Informatical Conference in Zakopane blocked from printing. His article on KAR-65 in Maszyny Matematyczne from the same year was blocked, as well. A similar fate befell the articles on the subject by popular journalists Stefan Bratkowski and Aleksander Bocheński. Before his interview with the TV programme Tele-Echo Karpiński received an official ban on talking about the computer. He complained about the matter to the President of the Committee of Science and Technology Jacek Kaczmarek (28.04.1970), but received no backing.

== K-202 ==
In 1970, Karpiński decided to establish his own institution to work on his new idea, a minicomputer of original architecture, for which he sought backing from state officials. Karpiński was given permission to found Microcomputers' Construction Plant (Zakład Budowy Mikrokomputerów) in Warszawa-Włochy in 1970. The basis for the computer's construction was the fruit of the joint-venture agreement between the Polish state (represented by Metronex, a foreign trade office) and British private partners – companies Data-Loop and MB Metals. Karpiński, who orchestrated the agreement, was appointed technical director, fully responsible for the engineering aspect of the venture. The parts and finances were to be supplied by the British, but the entire construction and production process was to be done in Poland, something that Karpiński strongly insisted on. MB Metals and Data-Loop were given rights to sell the computer in all countries, except Poland. The companies were also solely responsible for the products promotion and distribution.

Karpiński collected a team of 113 employees, including programmers and hardware engineers such as Zbigniew Szwaj, Teresa Pajkowska, Andrzej Ziemkiewicz and Elżbieta Jezierska. The main objective of the project was to build a computer, which would be small, affordable (around 6.5 thousand dollars apiece), easy to produce and failproof. Great emphasis was also put on its modularity – Karpiński was determined to build an entire system, with flexible complexity and arrangement in line with user's needs. Production of 1300 units was planned in two initial series. The primary objective was commercial, but Karpiński intended for K-202 to be used in a vast variety of applications – in industry, administration, science and military (land and navy).

The team worked for three years and in 1973 first prototypes were completed. The result was a minicomputer highly innovative in many aspects. K-202 was constructed entirely with microchips, using breakthrough 1971 Intel 4004 chips. It was also asynchronic and used floating point representation, as KAR-65. Moreover, K-202 used memory segmentation with paging, the first minicomputer to do so. Additionally, it performed close to a million operations per second. These two things made K-202 faster than its potentially most dangerous competitors – DEC's PDP-11 and CTL's Modular One. The computer was small, could fit on the desk and weighed 35 kilograms. It was also highly shock-, water- and temperature-resistant. K-202 used authorial operation system SOK and dedicated ASSK programming language, but also supported ALGOL 60, FORTRAN IV, BASIC and others. The important feature was also a possibility of accessing up to 64 devices in the same time, hence the high level of freedom of architectural composition of a system.

Despite the technical excellence of the computer, it never reached mass production. Only 30 machines were ever produced and the conditions of work in Karpiński's team remained laboratorious rather than industrial. The reasons of this outcome remain unclear and are still a matter of historical debate. Karpiński himself pointed at the intentional efforts of some high-level officials, mostly Jerzy Huk, director at ZPAiAP "Mera", a local computer engineering giant and monopolist, manufacturer of Odra mainframes. Another possible enemy of Karpiński was col. Ryszard Kulesza, director of the Institute of Mathematical Machines within the Polish Academy of Sciences. Others, among them Stefan Bratkowski and Maciej Sysło, point out the general distrust toward foreign companies and unwillingness to take risks within the ruling class, especially if the project involved consumption of high amount of foreign currency, crucial to the failing communist economy. Another possible explanation for the lack of political will for Karpiński's case is the rise of the new, all-Comecon project of building a new family of computers within the communist bloc dubbed Riad. The project gained absolute priority, especially after its director Lavryonov's visit in Warsaw in autumn of 1972. Stefan Bratkowski point out that K-202 had the chance to succeed only as a part subjugated to the entire system, which Karpiński declined outright, considering the Riad project to be much inferior to K-202. A lack of proper industrial and institutional background, as well as Karpiński's personal traits – stubbornness, individualism and lack of social skills are also mentioned as possible reasons.

Karpiński found himself unable to find sufficient political backing, despite moderate support from the influential Franciszek Szlachcic and Józef Tejchma. He also rejected signing up for the communist party, which could have raised his chances significantly, according to the then Minister of Culture Józef Tejchma. Critics started to expose the high costs of the project (K-202 cost was $6500 per unit for foreign clients), and the lack of commercial success, accusing Karpiński of mismanagement, fraud and embezzlement. As a result, he lost his position within a project, which was swiftly rebranded as Mera 400 after very minor alterations (around 1% of functional content) and was not developed further, effectively ending the K-202's chances of commercial success. Most of the 30 prototypes worked extensively for several years in 43 different institutions throughout Poland. For example, in 1972, a K-202 machine was used to computerize the calculations of results of the European wrestling championships. Currently, only a few remain; one can be seen in the Museum of Technology in Warsaw. The only working copy is in private hands.

== Later life ==
Disappointed with the outcome of K-202 production, Karpiński in 1978 decided to move to the countryside near Olsztyn (village Dąbrówka Wielka) and started a small animal husbandry ranch. In 1981, on the invitation of Stefan Kudelski, Karpiński moved to Switzerland to work on Nagra tape recorders.

In 1990, after a series of unsuccessful business ventures, Karpiński decided to return to Poland. In the 1990s he served as an advisor on computer science to Andrzej Olechowski and Leszek Balcerowicz. He also tried to kickstart his own business ventures – a hand-held text-scanner 'Pen-Reader' invented during his stay in Switzerland and cash registers 'Libella', which both failed.

In 2009, he was awarded the Officer's Cross of Polonia Restituta for remarkable achievements in computer engineering.

Jacek Karpiński died on 21 February 2010 in Wrocław, where he had lived since 1996.

In 2010, he was posthumously awarded an even more prestigious Commander's Cross of Polonia Restituta, third-highest level of this order.

== Controversies ==
It has been revealed that Jacek Karpiński worked as a secret informant for the Służba Bezpieczeństwa since 1961. He received considerable financial rewards for his work, including foreign holidays with his wife sponsored by the state. Karpiński's work was mostly dedicated to collecting technological data. This was also stated by him to be the condition under which he is inclined to provide information. Karpiński was a valuable asset, having travelled extensively since the 1950s and possessing a wide range of international contacts. He provided the intelligence with a lot of useful information beginning with the international Expo in Leipzig in 1961. But the peak of his activity was reached during his trip to the United States, during which he amassed and passed an extensive amount of information on both the technological centres, but also personalities of American science and industry.

Historian Adam Kochajkiewicz claims his cooperation was heavily influenced by naivete on the situation in the scientific world and on the goals and methods of the intelligence. The intensity of Karpiński's cooperation decreased significantly in the 1970s, when Karpiński became not a cooperator, but a target for the intelligence. Karpiński had his passport withdrawn, informants were planted in his closest environment to gather information on him, his phone calls and private correspondence was also monitored.

Also, the scale of Karpiński's engineering achievement is hotly debated. It is claimed that his construction, most notably K-202, were innovative enough (or even superior) to successfully compete with the worldwide competition (most notably PDP-11 and Modular One) and as such K-202's failure marks one of the biggest opportunity of People's Republic of Poland's for fast modernization – Adrian Markowski compared Karpiński to Bill Gates. It is also stated that Karpiński's defeat was primarily caused by administrative incompetence and acts of sabotage by his enemies. Critics point out the exaggerations in Karpiński's evaluation of his work and claim that the project's fate within state structures was, at least partly, justified. They, among them Maciej Sysło, underline the massive scale of funds and organization needed for the success of a new device and point out the uncertainty about the machine's real capabilities.

== References in culture ==
Jacek Karpiński is portrayed in Roman Bratny's novel Lot ku ziemi as Marek Zych.

=== Books ===
- P. Lipiński Geniusz i Świnie. Rzecz o Jacku Karpińskim, wyd. JanKa, 2014
- B. Kluska Automaty liczą. Komputery PRL., ResNovae, 2013
- A. Targowski, Informatyka bez złudzeń. 40 lat między informatyką a polityką i 20 lat między Polską a Ameryką, 2001
- R. Bratny Lot ku ziemi, PIW, 1976
- A. Kochajkiewicz Działania służb specjalnych Polski Ludowej wobec inżyniera Jacka Karpińskiego w latach 1950–1990, Przegląd Archiwalny IPN, 5/2012

== See also ==
- Analog computer
- K-202
- Minicomputer
- List of pioneers in computer science
