= The Fosdyke Saga =

British comic strip

- Author(s): Bill Tidy
- Launch date: March 1971
- End date: February 1985
- Publisher(s): Daily Mirror
- Genre(s): Humour

The Fosdyke Saga was a British comic strip by cartoonist Bill Tidy, published in the Daily Mirror newspaper from March 1971 – February 1985. Described as "a classic tale of struggle, power, personalities and tripe", the strip was a parody of John Galsworthy's classic novel series The Forsyte Saga. However, the slightly bizarre and strange antics of the characters and those around them had a Lancashire/Cheshire lean, with mangles, chimneys and soot ever-present.

== Plot ==
The Fosdyke Saga deals with the family of Jos Fosdyke; he inherits a tripe factory from Ben Ditchley who disinherits his wastrel son Roger. A large part of the subsequent saga deals with Roger's unsuccessful attempts to regain his inheritance or otherwise gain revenge over the next twelve years; for example, when one of the Fosdyke sons attempts to sell tripe in the United States during Prohibition, he is nearly killed by Ditchley and his gangster associates who are selling alcoholic tripe on the black market.

The many Fosdyke children grow up and have adventures of their own, including joining the Royal Flying Corps during World War I. Most of the rest of the saga involves the Fosdykes pursuing the tripe business in various ways, such as planting a case of tripe at the South Pole and attempting to sell tripe to the USSR.

Each book included bizarre settings, such as a rugby game between a Welsh choir and a lady's casual rugby team held in a Salford hotel (the stairs collapsed in the first half), a hunt for the Tripe Naughtee, and a "Brain of Salford" competition.

== Production ==
Created and drawn by well-known cartoonist Bill Tidy, who also produced cartoons for the satirical magazine Private Eye and created The Cloggies, the wry humour in this classic 1970s comic strip was very popular, if often unintelligible to those outside of the mid-north-west of England.

== Cancellation ==
The series was axed from the Daily Mirror in 1985, the year after tycoon Robert Maxwell had purchased Mirror Group Newspapers.

== Adaptations ==
The Fosdyke Saga has been adapted as a TV series (starring Roger Sloman and Sherrie Hewson), a radio serial by the BBC and a stage play.

The radio adaptation starred (among others) Miriam Margolyes, Enn Reitel, Christian Rodska and David Threlfall.
