= Marijac =

French comics author (1908–1994)

- Born: Jacques Dumas; 7 November 1908 Paris, France
- Died: 21 July 1994 (aged 85)
- Areas: artist, writer
- Awards: Grand Prix de la ville d'Angoulême

Jacques Dumas (7 November 1908 – 21 July 1994), better known as Marijac, was a French comics writer, artist, and editor.

== Biography ==
Jacques Dumas was born in Paris in 1908. He started his career as a comics artist in te 1930s and used the pen name Marijac. His best-known character in this period was the cowboy Jim Boum, which appeared in Cœurs Vaillants. During the war, he entered the Resistance and started the popular magazine Coq Hardi, where he created the series Les trois mousquetaires du maquis. The magazine existed from 1944 until 1963. His focus then shifted to the writing of comics for well known French artists like Raymond Cazanave (Capitaine Fantôme), Raymond Poivet (Colonel X), Dut, Mathelot, Étienne Le Rallic (Poncho Libertas), Kline, Trubert, and Calvo (Coquin). In later years, he continued to work as an editor at magazines aimed at girls or younger children like Mireille, Frimousse and Nano et Nanette.

In 1979, he received the Grand Prix de la ville d'Angoulême, the highest comics award of France.

== Bibliography ==
Published by Gordinne, year unknown:

- Le tour du monde de Césarin l'intrépide
- Jean et Jo
- Lyne et Zoum

Published by Gordinne between 1935 and 1940

- Les premières aventures de Flic et Piaff, art by Étienne Le Rallic, also published in Dutch
- Capitaine Pat'Fol
- Les grandes chasses du capitaine Barbedure
- Jules Barigoule, 2 volumes, also published in Dutch
- Les aventures du capitaine Bricket
- Sidonie en vacances
- Joe Bing l'intrépide, 3 volumes, 2 of those appeared in Dutch in 1937
- Marinette cheftaine
- Rozet cochon de lait, 2 volumes
- Mirobolant - aventures aérodynamiques

Published by Châteaudun, year unknown:

- Cathy, 2 volumes, art by Gloesner
- Dolores de Villafranca, art by Gloesner
- Laideron, 2 volumes, art by Gloesner

Published by Châteaudun between 1964 and 1983

- L'étroit mousquetaire, art by Jean Trubert
- Les petits révoltés du Bounty, art by Jean Trubert
- 1983 : Les trois Mousquetaires du Maquis, 3rd volume

Published by L'Auvergnat de Paris:

- 1936 : Les aventures de Baptistou petit Auvergnat

Published by ECA:

- 1942 : Capitaine mystère

Published by Selpa

- 1945 : Felicou chevalier des sous-bois

Published by Gautier-Langereau:

- 1953 - 1954 : Coquin le petit cocker, 2 volumes, art by Calvo

Published by Albatros:

- 1968 - 1969: Les trois Mousquetaires du Maquis, 2 volumes

Published by Glénat:

- 1975 : Guerre à la Terre, 2 volumes, art by Auguste Liquois and Dut
- 1976 - 1977: Capitaine fantôme, 2 volumes, art by Raymond Cazanave
- 1977 : Le chevalier à l'églantine, art by Le Rallic
- 1977 : Jim Boum, Le mustang fantome
- 1977 : Colonel X, art by Raymond Poïvet
- 1977 - 1979: Poncho Libertas, 3 volumes, art by Le Rallic
- 1978 : Sitting Bull, 2 volumes, art by Dut
- 1979 : Colonel X en extrême-orient, art by Gloesner
- 1979 : Capitaine Flamberge

Published by Sodieg

- 1977 : Costo chien policier

Published by Futuropolis

- 1979 : Coquin le petit cocker, 2 more volumes, art by Calvo

Published by Ribedit

- 1984 : Roland prince des bois, art by Kline

== Awards ==
- 1979: Grand Prix de la ville d'Angoulême

== Notes ==
- Béra, Michel; Denni, Michel; and Mellot, Philippe (2002): "Trésors de la Bande Dessinée 2003-2004". Paris, Les éditions de l'amateur. ISBN 2-85917-357-9
- Matla, Hans: "Stripkatalogus 9: De negende dimensie". Panda, Den Haag, 1998. ISBN 90-6438-111-9
