= AKAT-1 =

Computer invented by Jacek Karpiński

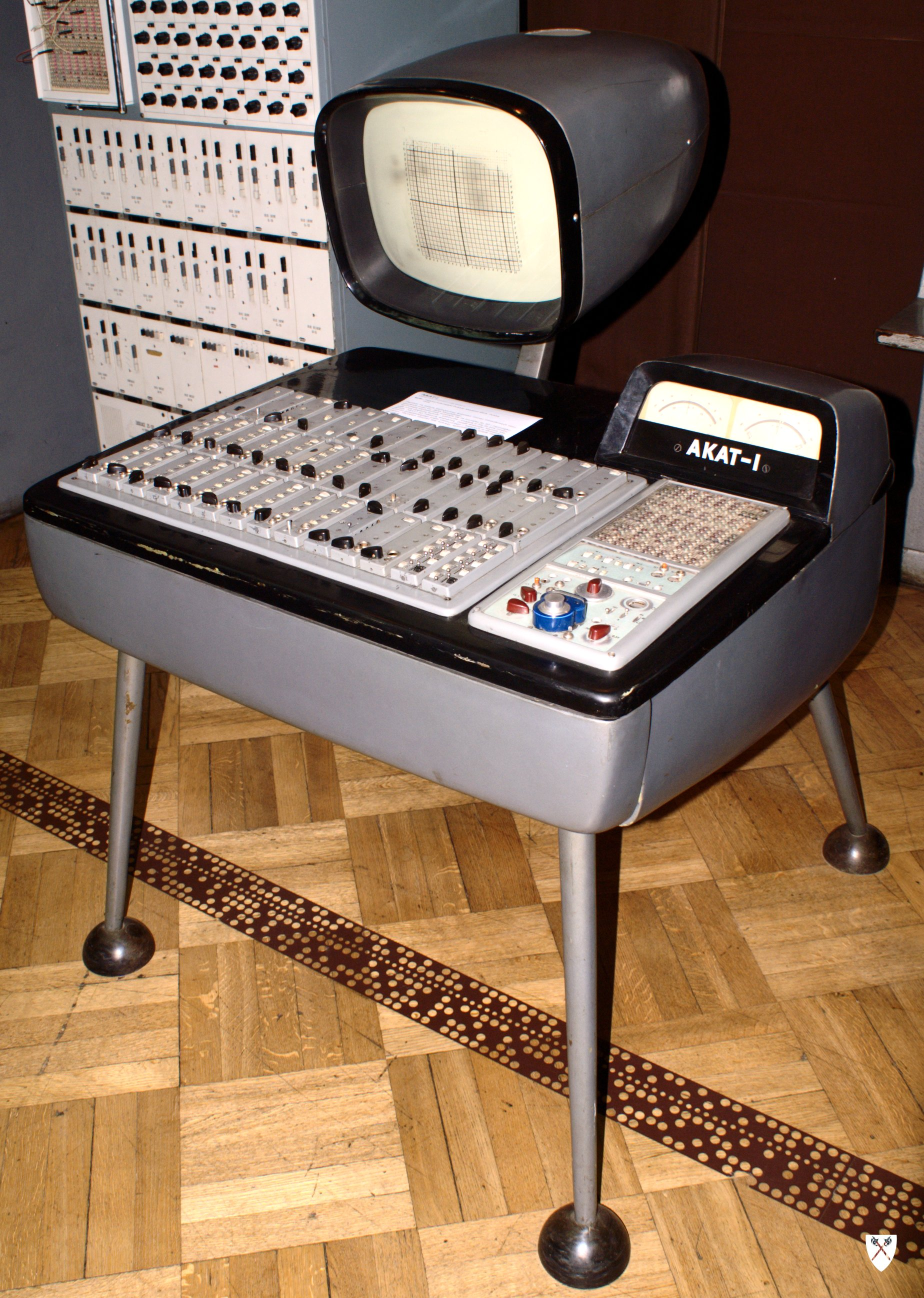
- AKAT-1
- Developer: Jacek Karpiński and Janusz Tomaszewski
- Released: 1959
- Marketing target: Science

AKAT-1 is a historic analog computer.

Constructed in 1959 by Jacek Karpiński and Janusz Tomaszewski it was the world's first transistorised differential equations analyzer.

== Background ==
Karpiński built the device at the Polish Academy of Science's Institute of Automatics. AKAT-1 aimed to simulate various complex dynamic processes like thermodynamics, heat transfer or a shock absorber's mechanics. The device's innovativeness was acknowledged by computer science historians, e.g. Maciej Sysło claims it has to be conceded that Karpiński's effort preceded any other similar device. The construction was also lauded for its aesthetical merits. The panel designed by leading Polish artists Emil Cieślar, Olgierd Rutkowski, Stanisław Siemek and Andrzej Wróblewski at the Warsaw Academy of Fine Arts had been considered to 'innovatively merge all functions in a congruent and attractive form that anticipated the future trends'. The machine has been domestically welcomed warmly, having been covered by a host of country-wide media, including national television TVP1 and Polish Film Chronicle.

== Production ==
The AKAT-1 was only implemented as prototype. Due to political reasons the system never went into mass production.

== Current state ==
A prototype of the machine is exhibited in the Museum of Technology in Warsaw.
