= Cœurs Vaillants =

Catholic French language weekly junior newspaper

- Type: Weekly newspaper for children aged 11 to 14
- Owner(s): Gabriel Bard; Pierre Rougement (Henri Guesdon); Gaston Courtois
- Founded: 1929
- Ceased publication: 1981
- Political alignment: French Catholic
- Language: French
- Headquarters: Paris, France

Cœurs Vaillants (Brave Hearts), known later as J2 Jeunes and Formule 1, was a Catholic French language weekly newspaper for French children. Founded in 1929 by l'Union des œuvres catholiques de France (The Union of Catholic Works of France; UOCF), the weekly newspaper targeted readers aged 11 to 14 to become part of l'Action catholique des enfants (The Catholic Action for Children; ACE). The newspaper is notable for introducing The Adventures of Tintin to France, as well as Sylvain et Sylvette, the comics of Marijac, and of Cabu.

== History ==
Cœurs Vaillants was founded December 8, 1929 by the conservative Catholic organization l'Union des œuvres catholiques de France (The Union of Catholic Works of France; UOCF). The founders were Father Gabriel Bard of the Catholic Union of France, Pierre Rougemont (pseudonym of Father Henri Guesdon), and Gaston Courtois, a priest attached to the religious congregation Fils de la charité (Son of Charity). Later in 1935, the team was strengthened by the arrival of Father Jean Pihan, ex-John Vaillant, 1912–1996, also of Son of Charity. Cœurs Vaillants was a weekly newspaper, targeting readers aged 11 to 14 to become a movement of the church, l'Action catholique des enfants (The Catholic Action for Children; ACE), an organization which continues to this day.

The following year, in 1930, The Adventures of Tintin, the series of comic albums created by Belgian cartoonist Hergé, began print syndication with Cœurs Vaillants. At first, the editors of Cœurs Vaillants were puzzled by the lack of caption text below Hergé's comic panels (as was the norm for comics of the day) and added their own text below each panel. Hergé objected, and even enrolled in an organization that protected author's rights. Cœurs Vaillants relented and published further Tintin strips without the captions. The newspaper continued to be the source of The Adventures of Tintin in France for the next seventeen years.

Cœurs Vaillants began publishing the French cartoonist Marijac in 1931 with his first comic strip Jim Boum, chevalier du Far West (Jim Boum, cowboy of the Far West). Cœurs Vaillants was also the first venue for the cartoonist Cabu who won a competition at age 12 and saw his first published drawing appear in the newspaper.

By 1936, Hergé created a new comic series at the request of Abbot Courtois, the editor of Cœurs Vaillants, who expressed the desire to see a series about real children with a real family (as opposed to Tintin's ambiguous age and family). The result was Jo, Zette and Jocko.

The owners of Cœurs Vaillants created a sister publication in 1938; Âmes vaillantes (Valiant Souls), for girls. From 1940 to 1942, Cœurs Vaillants was prohibited in the Zone occupée (Occupied Zone); it was replaced by the small periodical Belles Histoires de Vaillance (Beautiful Stories of Valor).

The French comics series Sylvain et Sylvette was created by Maurice Cuvillier in 1941 and appeared first on the pages of Cœurs Vaillants. Later it was published in a different French magazine, Fripounet et Marisette.

In 1963, now published by Éditions Fleurus, Cœurs Vaillants took the more contemporary name J2 Jeunes (J2 Youth). The "J" referred to "Jeudi" (Thursday), the day of publication, which is the day French children did not attend school. In 1971, the magazine was renamed Formula 1. In 1981, Formula 1 ceased publication.

=== The Adventures of Tintin published in Cœurs Vaillants ===
- Tintin in the Land of the Soviets
- Tintin in the Congo
- Tintin in America
- Cigars of the Pharaoh
- The Blue Lotus
- The Broken Ear
- The Black Island
- King Ottokar's Sceptre
- Land of Black Gold
- The Crab with the Golden Claws
- The Shooting Star
- The Secret of the Unicorn
- The Seven Crystal Balls

== See also ==
- Le Vingtième Siècle
