= Andrea Sutcliffe =

British chief executive

Andrea Mary Sutcliffe CBE
- Education: Queen Elizabeth Sixth Form College london School of Economics
- Occupations: Chief Executive of the Nursing and Midwifery Council.
- Writing career
- Language: English

Andrea Mary Sutcliffe CBE was the chief executive of the Nursing and Midwifery Council from 2019 to 2024, when she stepped down due to ill health

She was educated at Queen Elizabeth Sixth Form College in Darlington and the London School of Economics.

She started working in the health service at Tower Hamlets District Health Authority as a trainee management accountant in 1986 and became finance policy officer at Bloomsbury and Islington District Health Authority in 1989. In 1992 she moved to Camden and Islington Community Health Services, managing services for older people. She was General Manager for Children, Women and Neurosciences Services at St George's Healthcare NHS Trust and then assistant director in the Social Services Department for the London Borough of Camden.

She was Deputy Chief Executive at the National Institute for Health and Clinical Excellence from 2001 to 2008, Chief Executive of the Appointments Commission from 2008 to 2012, and Chief Executive of the Social Care Institute for Excellence before moving to the CQC as chief inspector of adult social care in October 2013. She remained at the CQC until December 2018.

Sutcliffe was appointed as chief executive of the Nursing and Midwifery Council in January 2019. Sutcliffe has said that previous attempts to diversify the governing council of the organisation had not worked, and an "ethnicity pay gap" existed there.

Her brother, Adrian, killed himself after a long struggle with clinical depression in 2006. She says. "My brother’s experience and the impact on my family underpin my approach to what I do, and serve as a constant reminder of some important lessons".

She was reckoned by the Health Service Journal to be the 23rd most influential person (and third most influential woman) in the English NHS in 2015.
