= Joseph Hanlon =

British Journalist

Joseph Hanlon (born 1941) is a British journalist, social scientist and Senior Lecturer in Development Policy and Practice at the Open University, Milton Keynes, United Kingdom. Born in the United States, he moved to Britain in 1971.

Hanlon has a bachelor's degree from MIT, and a Ph.D. in high-energy physics from Tufts University. Before moving to Mozambique and specializing in the problems of developing countries, he was an editor of Computerworld and technology policy editor of New Scientist.

== Publications ==
- Mozambique: The Revolution Under Fire. 1984, London, Zed Books. ISBN 0-86232-940-X.
- Beggar Your Neighbours: Apartheid Power in Southern Africa. 1986. James Currey. ISBN 0-85255-305-6.
- Mozambique and the Great Flood of 2000. With Frances Christie, 1986. Indiana University Press. ISBN 0-253-21473-4.
- The Sanctions Handbook. With Roger Omond, 1987, Harmondsworth, Penguin Books. ISBN 0-14-052388-X.
- Mozambique: Who Calls the Shots?. 1991. James Currey / Indiana University Press. ISBN 0-85255-346-3.
- “Renewed land debate and the ‘cargo cult’ in Mozambique”, Journal of Southern African Studies, Vol 30(3) (year: 2004), 603–626.
- Civil War, Civil Peace. Edited by Helen Yanacopulos and Joseph Hanlon, 2006. Chapters 1–5 by Joseph Hanlon. James Currey / Ohio University Press / The Open University. ISBN 0-89680-249-3.
- "Illegitimate" loans: Lenders, not borrowers are responsible', Third World Quarterly 27(2) (year:2006): 211–226.
- "Wolfowitz, the World Bank, and Illegitimate Lending", The Brown Journal of World Affairs. 13(2) (year: 2007): 41-54
- Is Poverty Decreasing in Mozambique? (2007)
- Do Bicycles Equal Development in Mozambique?. With Teresa Smart, 2008. James Currey. ISBN 978-1-84701-319-4.
- Just Give Money to the Poor: The Development Revolution from the Global South . With Armando Barrientos and David Hulme, 2010. Kumarian Press. ISBN 978-1-56549-333-9.
- "Bangladesh Confronts Climate Change: Keeping Our Heads above Water". With Manoj Roy and David Hulme, 2016. Anthem Press. ISBN 978-1-78308-633-7.
