= Queen Elizabeth Sixth Form College =

Coordinates: 54.5256°N 1.5651°W

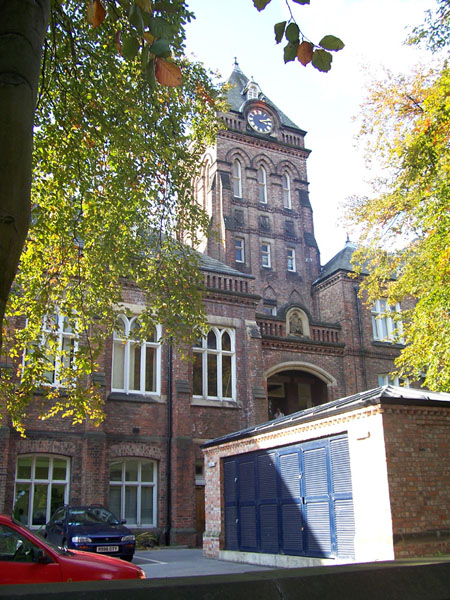

Location
- Vane Terrace; Darlington, County Durham, DL3 7AU; England

Information
- Type: Sixth form college
- Religious affiliation: Mixed
- Established: 1970
- Department for Education URN: 150514 Tables
- Ofsted: Reports
- Principal: Laurence Job
- Gender: Mixed
- Age: 16 to 18
- Enrolment: 2,000 (approx.)
- Telephone: 01325 461315
- Website: www.qeliz.ac.uk

Queen Elizabeth Sixth Form College, or QE as it is commonly known, is a sixth form college on Vane Terrace in Darlington, County Durham, England. It educates nearly 2000 students from Darlington and the surrounding areas with students coming from Stockton, Richmond, Newton Aycliffe, Sedgefield and elsewhere. It is situated near the town centre, next to Stanhope Park.

== History ==
It was established in 1970 on the site of the old Queen Elizabeth Grammar School, designed by George Gordon Hoskins. The original educational establishment was commissioned by Queen Elizabeth I, hence the name. Much of the building was refurbished following a fire in 1987 and on 17 April 1991, the Duchess of Kent opened the library. In 2004 a large extension was completed, the Trinity building, including a new sports hall, art department and atrium study area, increasing the capacity of students. In 2012 another extension was completed with the Stanhope building, designed to house creative arts and media, as well as a refurbishment of the library with more computer and study areas.

== Admissions ==
Queen Elizabeth Sixth Form College has almost 2000 students, mostly aged 16–18. It offers around 40 full-time AS and A level courses, some vocational courses and GCSEs, as well as several part-time evening classes. For most students the college requires that applicants have at least 6 GCSEs at grades 5 (old grade C) to 9 (old grade A*) to begin A level courses.

== Academic performance ==
A level results for 2011 had over 99% pass rate and over 60% A*-B grades.

== Alumni ==
- Jenny Chapman, Labour peer
- Lola McEvoy, Labour MP for Darlington (2024–present)
- Alex Cunningham, Labour MP for Stockton North (2010–present)
- Jane Kennedy, former Labour MP for Liverpool Wavertree
- Philippa Langley, discoverer of Richard III's body
- Alan Strickland, Labour MP for Newton Aycliffe and Spennymoor (2024–present)
- Andrea Sutcliffe, chief executive of the Nursing and Midwifery Council (1980–2)

=== Queen Elizabeth Grammar School ===
- Bentley Beetham, mountaineer, ornithologist and photographer
- Sir Geoffrey Cass, chief executive of Cambridge University Press from 1972 to 1992
- Aidan Chambers, children's novelist
- David Daniell, academic and literary critic
- Bernard Dixon, science writer
- Walter Ernest Dixon, pharmacologist
- David Harker, chief executive of Citizens Advice
- Angus Maddison, economist
- Eric Miller, industrialist
- Edward Pearce, political journalist
- Chapman Pincher, journalist
- James Francis Tait, physicist and endocrinologist
- Alan Wilson, mathematician, social scientist and university administrator

== See also ==
- List of English and Welsh endowed schools (19th century)
