= David Harker (charity administrator) =

Ronald David Harker CBE (2 March 1951 – 2 March 2015) was the Chief Executive of Citizens Advice from 1997 to 2010.

He was educated at Queen Elizabeth Grammar School, Darlington, the University of East Anglia (BA Social Studies, 1972), the University of Essex (MA, 1973), and London Business School (MBA, 1986).

He was made an OBE in 2003 and a CBE in the 2011 New Year Honours.
