= Edmond-François Calvo =

French comics artist

Edmond-François Calvo (French pronunciation: [ɛdmɔ̃ fʁɑ̃swa kalvo]; 26 August 1892 – 11 October 1957) was a French comics artist.

Born in 1892 in Elbeuf, France, he was in the army in the First World War, and started publishing cartoons in the 1920s. He had many different jobs, including working as a woodcarver and an innkeeper, until 1938, when he became a full-time artist. Most of his work had animals as the main characters, which together with his popularity and productivity gave him the nickname "The French Walt Disney".

His best known work is La bête est morte (started clandestinely in 1942, published as a book after the liberation in two parts in 1944–1945), a satire on the second World War with the different countries depicted as different animals, a system that would later be used by Art Spiegelman in his graphic novel Maus. The story was written by Victor Dancette and Jacques Zimmermann, and the comic was translated in English and Dutch. Other well-known works include Patamousse (1943–1946), about a rabbit, and Rosalie from 1946, where the main character wasn't an animal but a living car. Cricri souris d'appartement became the eponymous series for Cricri magazine. His last major series was Moustache et Trottinette (1952–1958), which was continued after his death by Jean Trubert.

He also contributed cartoons to satirical magazines like Le Canard enchaîné, and was active as a sculptor.

Calvo died in 1957 in the 20th arrondissement of Paris.

Calvo's graphical style, while often admired, has not really been influential. Only Albert Uderzo, the artist of Asterix, was directly influenced by Calvo after visiting him while still young.

== Bibliography ==
This is a list of published books of his work, not the many other works he made for newspapers or magazines.

- 1939: Robin des Bois (reprinted 1949)
- 1941: Les Voyages de Gulliver
- 1943: Un chasseur sachant chasser
- 1943–1946: Patamousse, 3 albums, written by Calvo
- 1944–1945: La bête est morte, translated in Dutch (1946, reprint 1977)
- 1944: Croquemulot
- 1946: Rosalie, reprinted in 2012 by Gallimard
- 1946: Mr. Loyal
- 1946: Anatomies atomiques
- 1947: Cendrillon et le Petit Chaperon rouge
- 1947: La Belle au bois dormant
- 1947: Souricette
- 1947–1948: Le Petit Poucet, 2 albums
- 1948: Le chevalier du feu
- 1949: Don Quichotte
- 1953–1955: Coquin le Petit Cocker, 5 albums, written by Marijac
- 1956–1960: Moustache et Trottinette, 14 albums, written by Calvo, translated in Dutch (2 albums)
- 1957: Cricri souris d'appartement, 2 albums, written by Marijac
