= Iann Barron =

British computer scientist (1936–2022)

- Born: 16 June 1936; Watford, Hertfordshire, England
- Died: 16 May 2022 (aged 85); Barrow Gurney, Somerset, England
- Education: University College School; Christ's College, Cambridge
- Engineering career
- Projects: Transputer
- Significant design: Elliott 803

Iann Marchant Barron CBE (16 June 1936 – 16 May 2022) was a British computer engineer and entrepreneur.

== Life and career ==
Iann Marchant Barron was born in Watford, Hertfordshire, England on 16 June 1936. During vacation work in 1956–57 at Elliott Brothers while still at Cambridge he designed the Elliott 803. On leaving University he joined the Civil Service in 1958 as a Scientific Officer on special assignment first to the Army Operational Research Group, and in 1960 to the Air Ministry.

He returned to the company now called Elliott Automation as a Project Leader for the Elliott 502 computer team, later becoming the company's Head of System Research.

In 1965 Barron left Elliott Automation to become Founder and Managing Director of Computer Technology Limited, where the Modular One range of computer systems was developed.

In the mid-1970s he formed a new company, Microcomputer Analysis Ltd, which offered consultancy on microprocessors to the semiconductor industry. This brought him into contact with two eminent American semiconductor specialists, Richard Petritz and Paul Schroeder, and in 1978 the triumvirate founded Inmos International PLC, which produced the innovative transputer, and led to the development of SpaceWire.

Barron was elected a Distinguished Fellow of the British Computer Society (DFBCS) in 1986 and was appointed CBE in the 1994 New Year Honours.

Barron died from cancer at home in Barrow Gurney, Somerset, on 16 May 2022, at the age of 85.

== Bibliography ==
- "The Origins of SpaceWire", Paul Walker
- "The Inmos Legacy", Dick Selwood, August 2007, inmos.com
- "In Barron's Court", IEE Review, 16 January 1997
- "Transputer-> Forgotten Futures", 1998 USENET discussion in comp.sys.transputer
