= Sylvain et Sylvette =

Sylvain and Sylvette.

Sylvain et Sylvette is a French comics series created in 1941 by Maurice Cuvillier. The most popular and successful series relating the adventures of Sylvain and Sylvette were drawn by Jean-Louis Pesch and are currently published by Dargaud. This is the only series still unfinished and published.

== Publication history ==
The first series dedicated to the comics characters Sylvain and Sylvette was created by Maurice Cuvillier in 1941 for the magazine Cœurs Vaillants, and later published in the magazine Fripounet et Marisette. From 1956, Jean-Louis Pesch and Claude Dubois took over the series and drew and wrote albums on their own and separately, but still in the same series, published by Fleurus from 1953. Cuvillier stopped drawing in 1958, and a new series was launched in 1967, with the same authors and publisher. In 1973, an alternative series called "Seribis" was created, grouping Jean-Louis Pesch's albums and published in the casual size for comics, so that the former series stopped and from 1978, Dubois and Pesch published albums in distinct series. In 1986, Fleurus stopped publishing these adventures. While Dubois gave up, Pesch's series went on being published thanks to Le Lombard from 1990, then by Dargaud from 2001. All the albums of the former series "Seribis" were republished by Le Lombard and Dargaud.

== Evolution of the series ==
At the beginning of the series, as drawn and written by Maurice Cuvillier, the story is a call to go back to nature and a traditional way of life influenced by the catholicism and the attachment to land. In the first series, Sylvain and Sylvette has fewer animals than in the current series. At that time, their pets comprised only Gris – Gris, Cui – Cui, Moustachu, Panpan, Barbichette, Mignonnet, Raton, Poulette, and all of them play active roles. As for the "compères", they are all very dangerous and mean and are the archetypes of the villains, so that the series was designed as largely dualistic and moralistic. The themes of justice and punishment are very present in the spirit of the Cuvillier's albums, and Sylvain and Sylvette don't hesitate to severely retaliate against their pets when they joke or make a mistake.

Gradually, these characters evolved under the influence of Claude Dubois and above all Jean-Louis Pesch who turned the comperes into comic protagonists and added some characters. But the theme of nature is still very present in the recent albums who praise the beauty and the harmony of the country. Jean-Louis Pesch focused much more than Cuvillier on the life in the forest and the necessary protection of nature. The graphic style of the series also evolved a lot, and while Jean-Louis Pesch had a style similar to that of Cuvillier and Dubois, his drawings became more original and individual.

== Synopsis ==
This is the synopsis of the series currently published by Dargaud and designed by Jean-Louis Pesch.

Sylvain et Sylvette, are the main characters of the comics series. Orphans, they live alone and autonomously in a house that they call their "cottage", in the middle of the forest. They live with several animals referred in the series as their "friends" and have a very simple way of life, wearing clogs and eating with picking and fishing. Sometimes they pass to Laville (literally "Thetown" in French), a small village near their house, when they need a doctor or a veterinary for example. However, four starving animals, the "comperes", who live in a cavern not far from the cottage, seek to catch their animals or to steal their food. The atmosphere of the series is largely humoristic and the so-called villains' attempt to catch animals always fails. In some albums, Sylvain and Sylvette live more adventurous situations than the usual fight against the Comperes, particularly when Tartalo, a scientist, intervenes in the story.

== Characters ==
Here are the characters present in the series drawn by Jean-Louis Pesch and published in the casual format for comics. The characters are described as they appear in this series only.

The main characters of the series, as they appear on the back cover of the most recent albums.

=== Main characters ===
- Sylvain: rather optimistic and resourceful to avoid the Comperes' traps and attacks.
- Sylvette: courageous and pessimistic, she takes care of cooking, washing and cleaning.

=== Sylvain and Sylvette's pets ===
- Cui-cui, small red bird, very vigilant, he watches over the cottage and warm in case of danger.
- Gris-gris, the donkey who pulls the owners' carriage, often complains about this charge.
- Barbichette, the manny-goat, is the most relentless enemy of Compere Renard.
- Mignonnet, a lamb, very naive and weak, he is a frequent target for Renard and Loup.
- Poulette, a hen and another target for the Comperes.
- Coin-coin, a duck also threatened by the Comperes' appetite.
- Sidonie, wild goose cured by the owners, and also targeted by the Comperes.
- Raton, a rat joker and mischievous.
- Cloé, a turtle who claims not to be afraid of the Comperes.
- Alfred, a spotted watchdog.
- Panpan, a comic rabbit.
- Moustachu, a red-haired cat.
- Olga, a crow.

=== The "compères" ===
In the French series, these four animals are called "les compères" ("the mates" or "the partners" in French), and each of them are called either by their zoological name with capital letters, which suggests it is their real name (for example, the fox is called "Renard" or "Compere Renard").

- Renard (fox), his specialities are spying the cottage and finding ideas.
- Loup (wolf), rather wary of Renard's ideas, he doesn't hesitate to scold him each time they fail.
- Ours (bear), very stupid and thoughtless but very strong, he can sometimes be helpful in the Comperes' attempts.
- Sanglier (boar), inactive compere, he contents himself with eating potatoes and laughing at other mates' failures.

=== Other characters ===
- Bastien, bear who used to work for a circus, he decided to retire. Compere Ours' cousin, he is a reader of "l'Ours libre" magazine.
- Léocadie, former circus bear and Bastien's wife, very wary of the Compere, especially Renard
- Basile, Bastien and Leocadie's son, likes following Renard especially when he is suited by Barbichette, believing it is a race.
- Croa-croa, a raven who stammers, and occasional ally of the Comperes, he provides them with information.
- Hurluberlu, an owl who lives in the forest and sleeps during the day, but occasionally helps Sylvain and Sylvette.
- Tartalo, a scientist who seeks refuge either in a castle or in a mill not far from the cottage to develop unbelievable inventions.

== Albums ==
These albums were first published by Fleurus 1973–1986 in the series called "Seribis". Then the series was entirely republished by Le Lombard from 1990 to 2001 and by Dargaud after 2001. Only the first publication is mentioned. All these albums were drawn by Jean-Louis Pesch, unless indicated.

By Jean-Louis Pesch

- 1. La ferme abandonnée
- 2. La chasse au canard
- 3. Le lance-pierre
- 4. Le banquet des compères
- 5. La partie de luge
- 6. La chaumière en péril
- 7. Le voleur envolé
- 8. Drôle de corrida
- 9 Du poisson au menu
- 10 La lettre des compères
- 11. La clef perdue
- 12. Le bonhomme de neige
- 13. Le mot de passe
- 14. La grande épreuve
- 15. La forêt en danger
- 16 En avant la musique
- 17. Sauve qui peut
- 18. Le défi des compères
- 19. L'escapade de Cloé
- 20. Le mystère de Castelbobêche
- 21. Le sauvetage de Sidonie
- 22. L'embuscade
- 23. Le génie de la forêt
- 24. Des pas dans la neige
- 25. La malle à malices
- 26. Fromages à emporter
- 27. L'arbre qui parle
- 28. Premier de cordée
- 29. Un nouveau petit Chaperon Rouge
- 30. Renard fait bande à part
- 31. Pauvre compère Renard
- 32. La nouvelle Sidonie
- 33. Le dragon volant
- 34. Le bonjour d'Alfred
- 35. Une lettre pour Nestor Bedondaine
- 36. La mystérieuse invention
- 37. La grotte de Patatrac
- 38. En piste, les compères!
- 39. Vas-y, Basile!
- 40. La vengeance de Barbichette
- 41 La machine infernale
- 42. Magie dans la forêt

Other authors

- 43. Le plein de gags (one-strip stories, written by Pesch and Belom and illustrated by Pesch)
- 44. Silence, on tourne ! (written by Pesch, illustrated and coloured by Berik)
- 45. Cascade de gags (one-strip stories, written by Pesch and Belom and illustrated by Pesch)
- 46. La croisière des compères (by Berik)
- 48. Bouquet de gags ! (one-strip stories, written by Pesch and Belom and illustrated by Pesch)
- 49. Pluie d'étoiles (written by Pesch, illustrated by Berik, and coloured by Berik and Veronique Bergese)
- 50. Guirlandes de gags ! (one-strip stories, written by Pesch and Belom and illustrated by Pesch)
- 51. Le petit gorille (by Berik, coloured by Veronique Bergese)
- 52. Le trésor du pirate (by Jean-Louis Pesch)
- 53. Tranches de gags ! (one-strip stories, by Berik)
- 54. La ruée vers l'eau (by Berik)

== Other publications ==
There were several series relating the adventures of Sylvain and Sylvette, all finished. They consist of albums published in the Italian size (29х23 cm) comprising 20 pages, unless indicated. The illustrations are separately by Maurice Cuvillier, Claude Dubois, Pierre Chéry and Jean-Louis Pesch. The artist is also the writer, unless indicated. The albums drawn by Cuvillier have been republished by Editions du Triomphe since 1998.

- Les aventures de Sylvain et Sylvette (albums Fleurette) is the first series, published by Fleurus in the collection Serie Fleurette. 84 volumes were published between 1953 and 1967.
- Sylvain et Sylvette (collection Fleurette nouvelle série) consists of 97 volumes published in the collection Fleurette from 1967 to 1979 and drawn separately by Jean-Louis Pesch and Claude Dubois.
- Sylvain et Sylvette (Fleurette troisième série)' consists of 30 volumes published from 1978 to 1986, drawn by Claude Dubois and written by Robert Guénin.
- Sylvain et Sylvette (albums pour les tous petits) comprises small-sized albums (18х19 cm) for children of more than three years, all drawn by Pesch and published by Dargaud jeunesse between 1993 and 1996.
- Les nouvelles aventures de Sylvain et Sylvette consists of 10 volumes of normal size drawn between 1957 and 1965 by Pierre Chery and Jean-Louis Pesch.
- Le grenier de Sylvain et Sylvette are the very first adventures of Sylvain and Sylvette drawn by Cuvillier from 1941 to 1948 and previously unpublished in albums. Published by Le Triomphe since 1998.
