= Jean-Louis Pesch =

French writer (1928–2023)

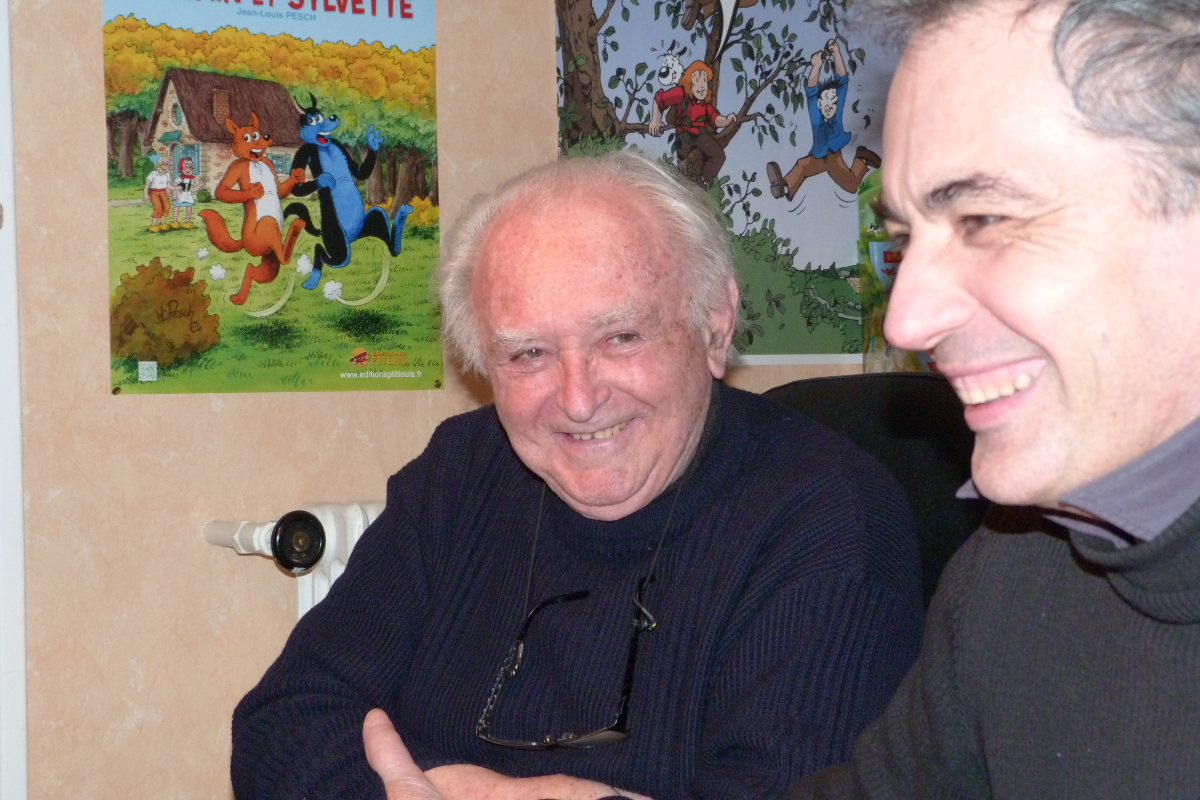
- Born: Jean-Louis Poisson; 29 June 1928 Paris, France
- Died: 17 May 2023 (aged 94)
- Areas: writer, drawer
- Notable works: Sylvain et Sylvette

Jean-Louis Poisson (29 June 1928 – 17 May 2023), better known as Jean Louis Pesch, was a French author of comics series, including Sylvain et Sylvette.

== Biography ==
Born on 29 June 1928, he lived at Juvardeil, a small village in Anjou (France). There he learned to love nature and animals. His parents being both artists, he discovered during his youth the works of several cartoonists, among them Maurice Cuvillier. He read from 1934 Mickey magazine, Junior, Aventures, Robinson, Hop-là!. and various albums.

At 14, he passed the entrance exam of l'Ecole des Arts Appliqués in Paris. During the war, he returned to Juvardeil to work in farming. In 1945, he got employed in the navy for three years, and then worked in animation. In 1950 he founded an advertisement studio. He worked in magazines for children beginning in 1954: Capucine, Mireille, L'intrepide, Bernadette, Coeurs Vaillants, Ames Vaillantes, Fripounet et Marisette, Le Pelerin, and Tintin. In that time, he created many comics heroes and published some animal stories at Fleurus editions.

Pesch also launched Pinpinville, adventures inspired from Le Roman de Renard. As a specialist of animal illustrations, he proposed to take over the Sylvain et Sylvette series in 1956, at Cuvillier's death. In 1964, he created with Henriette Robitaillie the series Bec-en Fer published in Le Pelerin. In 1980, he took over alone this series. This series, in which he denounced comically violence, malice, stupidity and fanaticism, was dedicated to older persons. Seven albums were published between 1980 and 1995. In 1981, he took over Louis Forton and Pellos' Pieds Nickelés.

Pesch died on 17 May 2023, at the age of 94.

== Awards ==
In 1974, Pesch was named best wildlife artist at the Toulouse Salon of comics. In 1992 he received the Youth prize at the Illzach festival.
