= Tom Margerison =

British journalist, author, and broadcaster (1923–2014)

Tom Margerison

Thomas Alan Margerison (13 November 1923 – 25 February 2014) was a British science journalist, author, and broadcaster who founded the magazine New Scientist in 1956. He was a science correspondent for The Sunday Times, which he joined in 1961.

== Biography ==
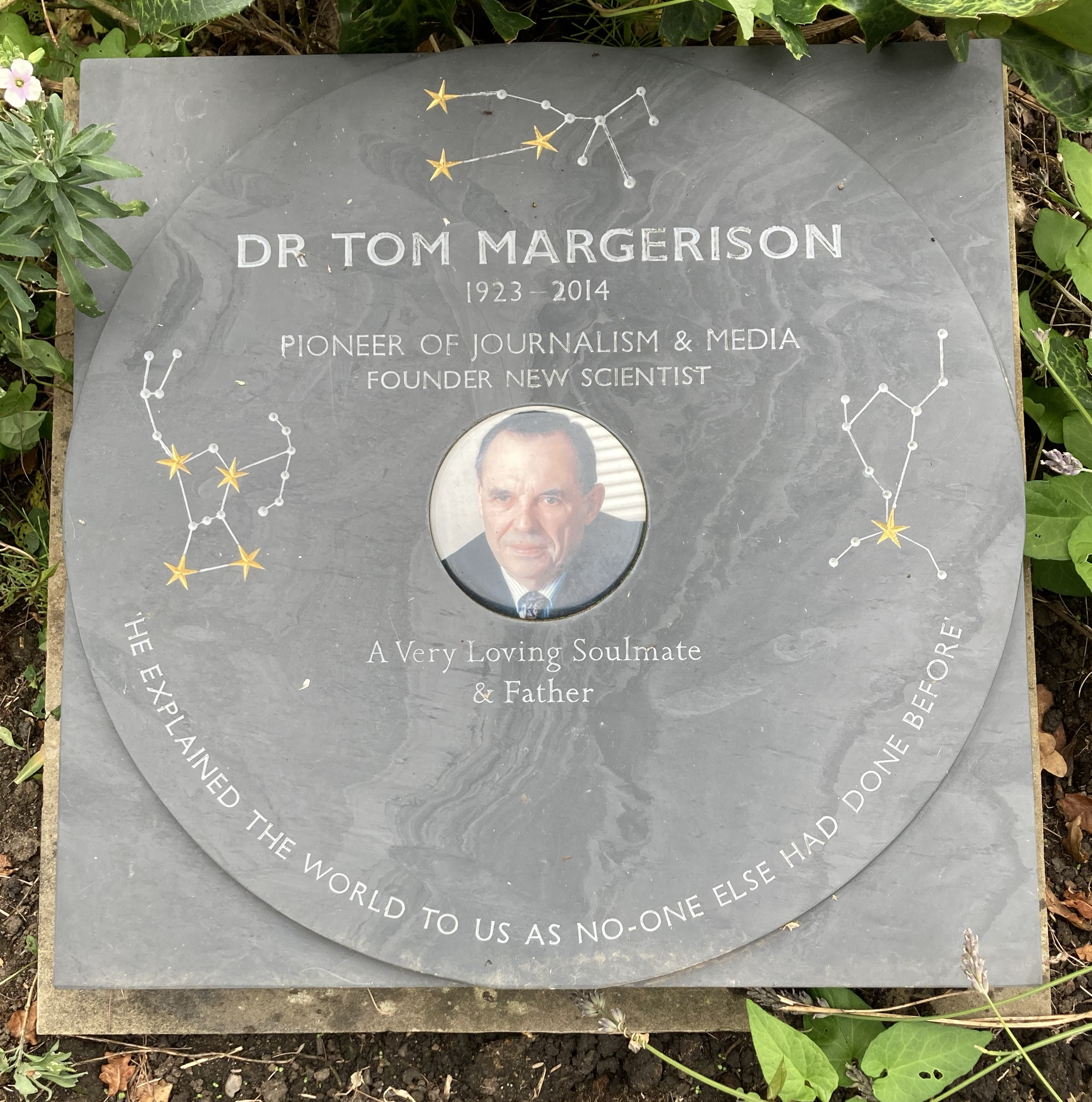
Grave of Tom Margerison in Highgate Cemetery

Margerison partnered David Frost to form what became London Weekend Television (LWT), a new ITV contractor from August 1968. He was LWT's first deputy managing director, becoming both chairman and chief executive of the company within two years. Margerison left LWT in 1971. He served as the chairman of Computer Technology Limited from 1971 to 1975.

Margerison died on 25 February 2014, aged 90. He was survived by his partner, journalist Marjorie Wallace, with whom he had lived since the mid-1980s, by their daughter, Sophia Margerison, and by Peter and Angus, his two sons by his ex-wife Pamela Margerison (née Tilbrook) grandchildren Sam,Jess,Jamie and Dan. His ashes are buried on the east side of Highgate Cemetery.
