= The Cloggies =

British cartoon strip

- The 1969 Cloggies book
- Author: Bill Tidy
- Launch date: 1967
- End date: 1986
- Publisher(s): Private Eye; The Listener
- Genre: Humour

The Cloggies, an Everyday Saga in the Life of Clog Dancing Folk, is a cartoon strip created by Bill Tidy. It ran in the satirical magazine Private Eye from 1967 to 1981, and later in The Listener from 1985 to 1986.

The strip served as a satire of northern English male culture and focused on a team of men who took part in what the group called Lancashire clog-dancing. This version of clog-dancing involved two teams dancing towards each other in formation, followed by each attempting to cripple their opponents with gracefully executed knee and foot moves. Tidy developed a deeply arcane and complex scoring system, with results such as 124.863 to 92 14/37 being recorded. Of all the moves, The Double or Flying Arkwright with Legs Akimbo was considered the most hazardous to perform, but was often a match-winner.

The strip has been credited with popularizing the word "cloggies", a slang term for clog dancers.

== History ==
=== Publication history ===
The Cloggies began as a single standalone cartoon published in the British satirical magazine Private Eye during 1967, which depicted a group in the midst of a morris dance as an army jeep tries to warn that they should remain still, as they were in a minefield. The cartoon was noticed by Private Eye co-founder Richard Ingrams, who believed that it could be expanded into a regular series. Other inspiration for this series may have grown out of one of Tidy's cartoons in Punch in the mid 1960s, where he parodied the funding objectives and credibility of the Arts Council of Great Britain by illustrating a group of morris dancers in full costume, gathered around a table outside a pub, behind an enormous pile of empties, with one of them asking "Well lads, what are we going to do wi' rest of Arts Council grant ?" Tidy agreed with Ingrams and the strip ran in the magazine until 1981. It was later picked up by the weekly magazine The Listener, where it was published from 1985 to 1986.

The strip was published in two formats, one a single panel cartoon and the other made of multiple panels.

Three retrospective collections of the cartoons were published between 1969 and 1977, with titles The Cloggies (1969), The Cloggies Dance Again (1973) and The Cloggies Are Back (1977).

=== Influences ===
The strip was sub-titled an Everyday Saga in the Life of Clog Dancing Folk, which Tidy intended as a parody of the long-running BBC radio series, The Archers, which was subtitled an Everyday Story of Country Folk. The strip also lampooned contemporary British sports culture and introduced an entire sub-culture of fictitious dance leagues, and an officious governing body for the sport of clog dancing. The Cloggies (especially Neville) were repeatedly hauled up before the disciplinary committee.

=== Similarities with Brass ===
In 1983, Granada Television began televising Brass, a comedy drama that satirized working-class period dramas of the 1970s. Tidy was critical of the series, noting that it bore several similarities to his work, specifically The Cloggies. In an interview with the Liverpool Echo, Tidy mentioned that he was not the first to see the similarities, as he had learned about them after reading a magazine article asking if he was going to pursue legal action.

== Synopsis ==
The strip focused on a team of clogdancers made up of seven men, who were described as undisputed champions of their ‘sport’, usually inflicting severe clog dance-related injuries on their opponents before repairing to the nearest pub. The characters were portrayed as heavy and enthusiastic drinkers, often served by barmaid Doris at their own local pub, the Clog & Bells in the fictitious Lancashire town of Blagdon. When Tidy decided on this toponym, he had not realised there was a Blagdon in Somerset.

The team consisted of:

- Stan Postlethwaite (captain), later ennobled as Lord Stan of Blagdon
- Albert Postlethwaite (second boot, with his false teeth)
- Neville (third boot; trilby and glasses) (or Wilfrid, trilby, glasses and moustache)
- Arnold (fourth boot)
- Ted (fifth boot, with the grey socks)
- Wally (sixth boot, later deceased, replaced by Norman).
- Norman (bearded).

Other local residents included Reginald ('Reg') Thrumper, the "Blagdon Amateur Rapist" and the unnamed 'Blagdon Groper and Nuisance'.

In one cartoon, the Cloggies were selected to represent Great Britain in the 1966 International Folk Dance Festival, beating the USSR in the final despite Wally’s double hernia, and returned victorious to Blagdon with the Gold Boot of Strichtenstein. They were persuaded to turn professional by their new manager, Morris ‘Zip’ Fassner (later Shufflebottom) and embarked on a world tour before once more returning to the Clog & Bells and rejoining their local league. Their opponents included The Bull & Veterinary Surgeon, The Flatulent Ferret, The Rat & Goldfish, The Horse & Shovel, The Truss & Slagheap, The Fox & Pervert, The Grunting Duck and Gridley’s Soap Works. In 1966, a strip showed the Cloggies winning the United Kingdom Drunk and Disorderly Shield.

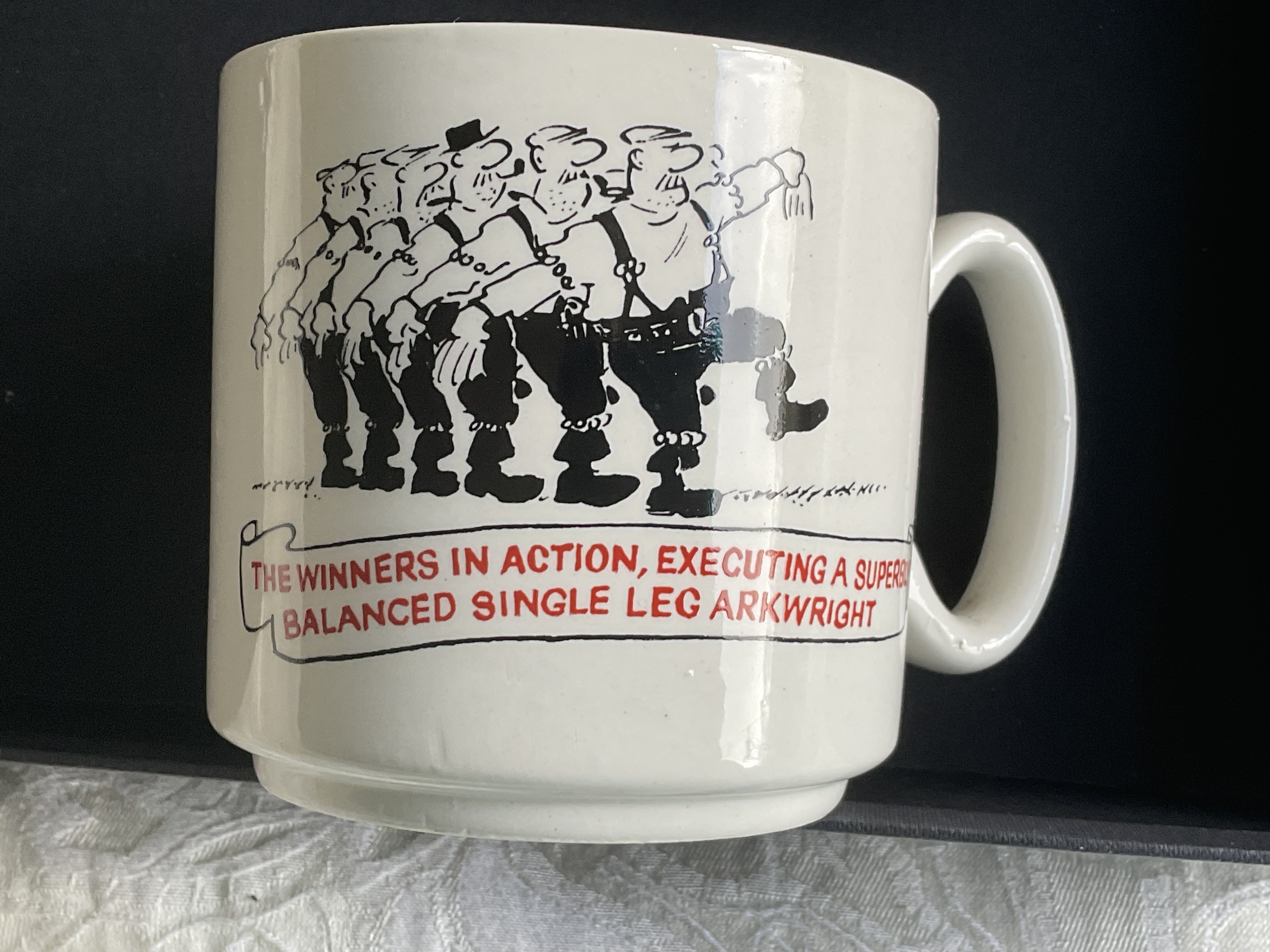
Commemorative Cloggies mug.

== Legacy ==
=== The Cloggies of University Hall Buckland ===
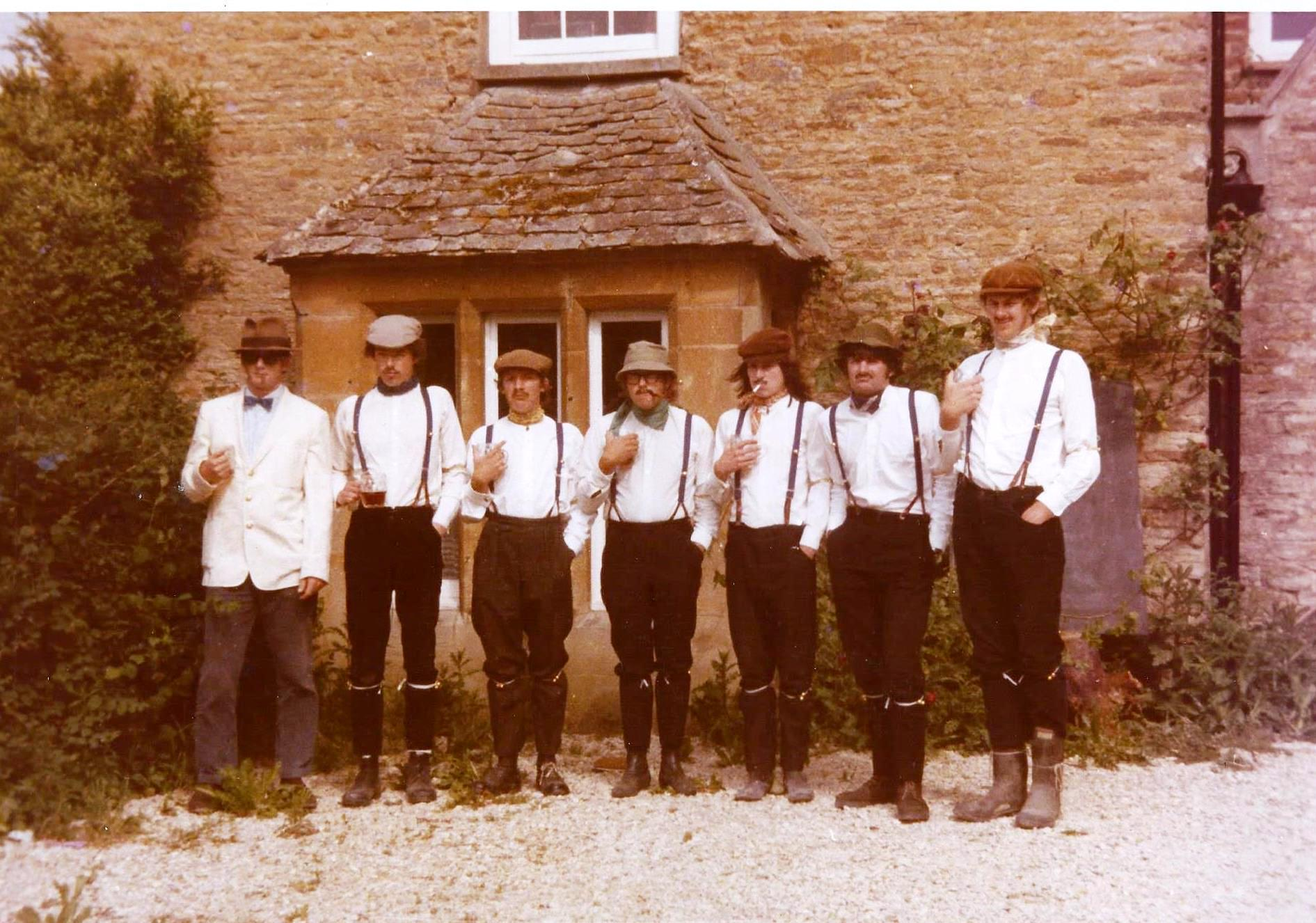
The 1968 Cloggies team outside The Lodge in Buckland

Although other dancers have more recently appropriated the name, the Cloggies originally took on a real life of their own in 1968 when a group of students at University Hall Buckland, Oxfordshire, became so inspired by the cartoon characters’ pub-oriented career that they formed their own squad. Two photographs from the period show the team warming up in their usual way before a match, and demonstrating simple moves. Bill Tidy personally wrote to the team to officially endorse and encourage them, delighted that “all those years spent labouring on Spam have produced a debased art form”.

The Cloggies performed to mixed receptions at several college events, offering terrifying moves such as The Forward Lunge with Curse, but their big breakthrough came when asked by producer Martin Pennock to take on the country-dancing roles in the closing scenes of John Milton’s Comus . Buckland was the smallest ever college (120 students) to enter the Sunday Times / NUS Drama Competition. The preliminary round took place at Lord Faringdon’s private theatre, whose stage was just wide enough to accommodate six Cloggies dancing abreast. As the play was about to start, the lights failed so the cast and audience settled in the pub until the power-cut ended. The adjudicator seemed more enthusiastic two hours later, but there was a delay in getting the Cloggies back on stage.

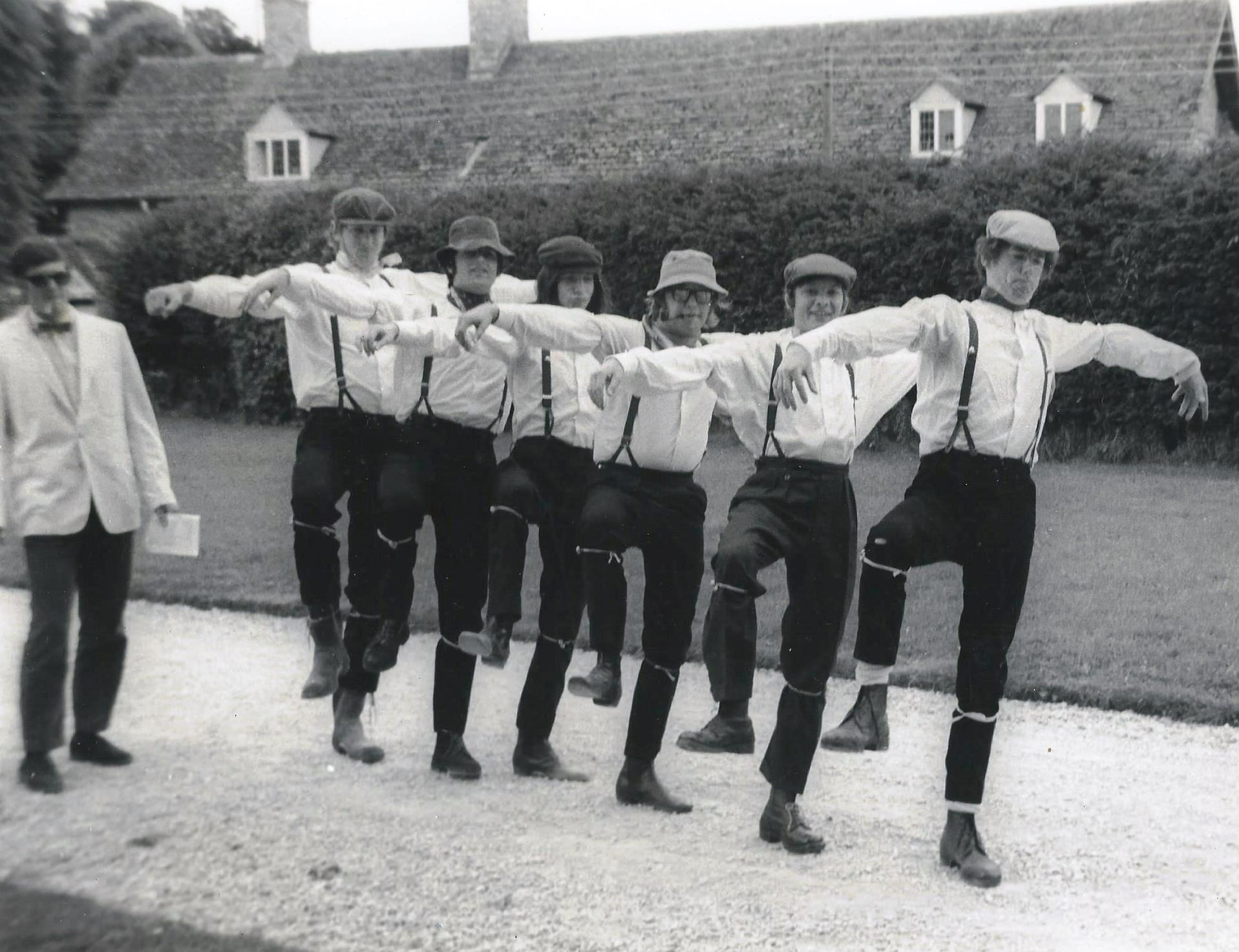
The Cloggies demonstrate a basic Single Leg Arkwright

Buckland was one of eight chosen from sixty universities and colleges to travel to Southampton University for the National Student Drama Festival Finals in the Winter of 1970/71. After sitting through several other productions, the audience went wild when the Cloggies hit the stage at the end of Comus. The Southern Arts Review praised the ‘boisterous rustic dancing Cloggies’, while French radio covered the event, describing them as “un groupe de danseurs folkloriques” and playing a recording of them dancing to the strains of Fairport Convention’s Lark in the Morning medley – the boots, the bells, the yells. Nicholas de Jongh, drama correspondent of The Guardian, wrote that the play was ‘… degraded into a cheap grotesque pantomime’, adding that, ‘the late appearance from the dancing Cloggies underlined the cheapness of the conception.’ The team felt that their role in the play had been misunderstood, but did not seek redress.

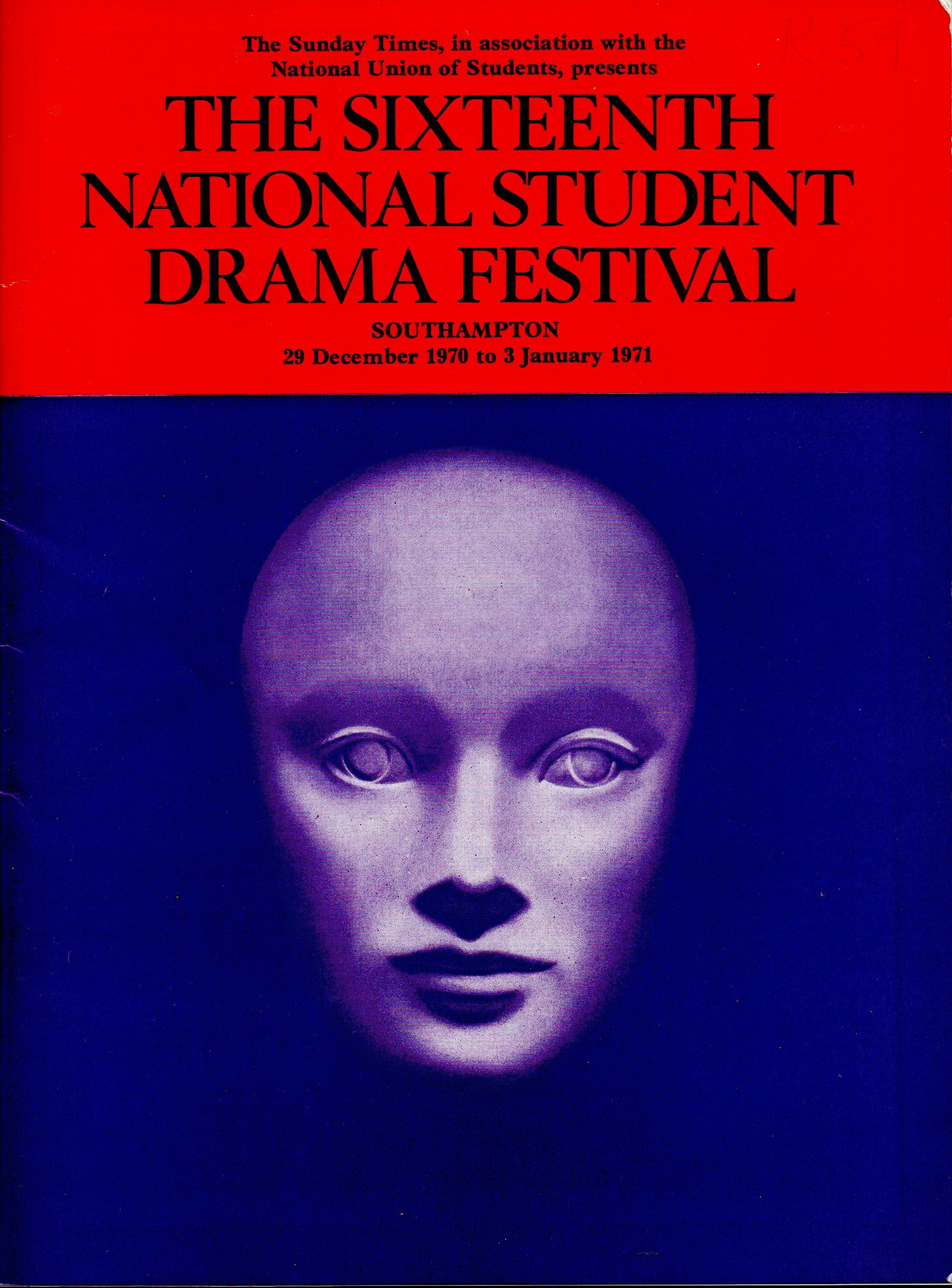
Student Drama Festival 1970/71

The Cloggies' swansong was as dancing shepherds in the British premiere of the medieval French fable Aucassin and Nicolette, translated by Alex Kerr and produced by Pennock in the college grounds on 27 June 1971.

An article on the history and achievements of the Buckland Cloggies appeared in the English Dance & Song magazine in Winter 1973 (Vol. XXXV No. 4). The Vaughan Williams Memorial Library is the repository.

=== Stage musical ===
A stage musical based on the series, entitled The Cloggies, ran at the Theatr Clwyd in Mold, Wales. The production was given a limited run from 24 October until 12 November 1983. The Cloggies experienced several issues with special effects and sound during its opening performance, prompting complaints from the audience. The play was later described as a failure by the Evening Post in 1995.

Critical reception at the time was negative, with journalists criticizing the musical for its humor. A journalist for The Chester Chronicle panned the portrayals of the titular Cloggies while citing Stephen Nallon's impression of Margaret Thatcher as a highlight. The Liverpool Echo's Walter Huntley also reviewed the musical, criticizing it for its poor sound quality and humor.

=== Exhibitions ===
Strips from The Cloggies, along with several of Tidy's other works, were displayed at the Walker Art Gallery in Liverpool during 1986.

=== Other works ===
During the 1990s, Tidy announced that there was interest in an animated series based on The Cloggies and that he had written a few scripts for an unnamed Yorkshire television station. No series was produced.

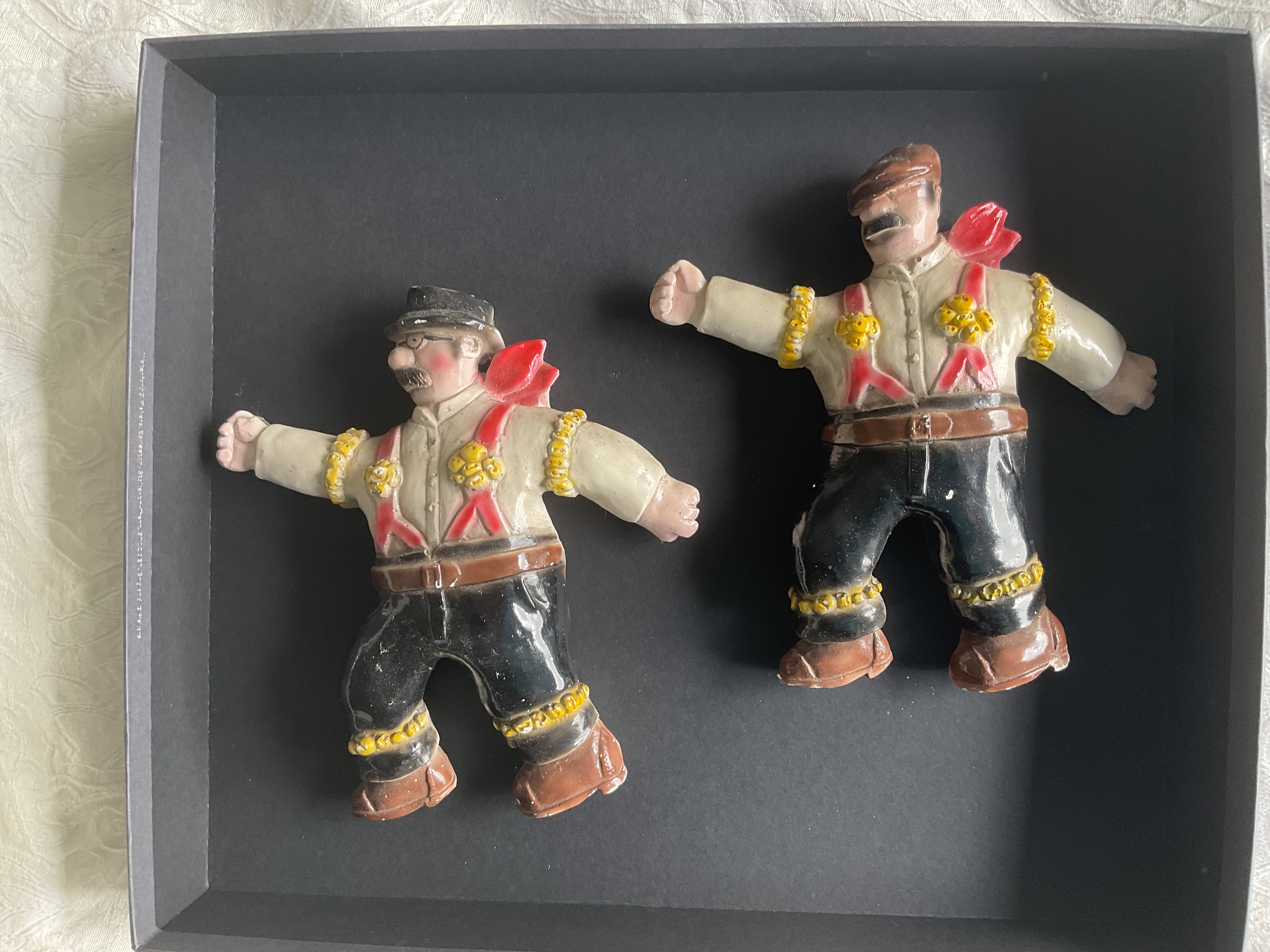
Flying Cloggies wall hanging.
