= Étienne Le Rallic =

French illustrator and comics artist

Étienne Le Rallic (1891–1968) was a French illustrator and comics artist.
