= New Scientist =

British science magazine

- Cover of the 26 October 2024 issue
- Editor: Catherine de Lange
- Categories: Science
- Frequency: Weekly
- Total circulation: 126,724 (2023)
- Founder: Tom Margerison; Max Raison; Nicholas Harrison
- First issue: 22 November 1956 (69 years ago)
- Company: New Scientist Limited (part of DMGT)
- Country: United Kingdom
- Language: English
- Website: www.newscientist.com
- ISSN: 0262-4079

New Scientist is a popular science magazine covering all aspects of science and technology. Based in London, it publishes weekly English-language editions in the United Kingdom, the United States and Australia. An editorially separate organisation publishes a monthly Dutch-language edition. First published on 22 November 1956, New Scientist has been available in online form since 1996.

Sold in retail outlets (paper edition) and on subscription (paper and/or online), the magazine covers news, features, reviews and commentary on science, technology and their implications. New Scientist also publishes speculative articles, ranging from the technical to the philosophical.

New Scientist was acquired by Daily Mail and General Trust (DMGT) in March 2021.

== History ==
=== Ownership ===
The magazine was founded in 1956 by Tom Margerison, Max Raison and Nicholas Harrison as The New Scientist, with Issue 1 on 22 November 1956, priced at one shilling (equivalent to £1.08 in 2025). An article in the magazine's 10th anniversary issues provides anecdotes on the founding of the magazine. The British monthly science magazine Science Journal, published from 1965 until 1971, was merged with New Scientist to form New Scientist and Science Journal. In 1970, the Reed Group, which became Reed Elsevier, acquired New Scientist when it merged with IPC Magazines. Reed retained the magazine when it sold most of its consumer titles in a management buyout to what is now TI Media. In April 2017 New Scientist changed ownership when RELX Group, formerly known as Reed Elsevier, sold the magazine to Kingston Acquisitions, a group established by Sir Bernard Gray, Louise Rogers and Matthew O'Sullivan to acquire New Scientist. Kingston Acquisitions then renamed itself New Scientist Ltd. The New Scientist was subsequently sold to the Daily Mail and General Trust (DMGT) for £70 million in March 2021; DMGT guaranteed the magazine's editorial independence, and ruled out staff cuts and the sharing of editorial content.

In December 2021, DMGT announced that both New Scientist and the DMGT-owned daily i newspaper would be moved to a new division of the company, to be called Harmsworth Media.

=== General history ===
Originally, the cover of New Scientist listed articles in plain text. Initially, page numbering followed academic practice with sequential numbering for each quarterly volume. So, for example, the first page of an issue in March could be 649 instead of 1. Later issues numbered issues separately. From the beginning of 1961 "The" was dropped from the title. From 1965, the front cover was illustrated. Until the 1970s, colour was not used except on the cover.

Since its first issue, New Scientist has written about the applications of science, through its coverage of technology. For example, the first issue included an article "Where next from Calder Hall?" on the future of nuclear power in the UK, a topic that it has covered throughout its history. In 1964, there was a regular "Science in British Industry" section with several items.

Throughout most of its history, New Scientist has published cartoons as light relief and comment on the news, with contributions from regulars such as Mike Peyton and David Austin. The Grimbledon Down comic strip, by cartoonist Bill Tidy, appeared from 1970 to 1994. The Ariadne pages in New Scientist commented on the lighter side of science and technology and included contributions from David E. H. Jones, Daedalus. The fictitious inventor devised plausible but impractical and humorous inventions, often developed by the (fictitious) DREADCO corporation. Daedalus later moved to Nature.

In the first half of 2013, the international circulation of New Scientist averaged 125,172. While this was a 4.3% reduction on the previous year's figure, it was a much smaller reduction in circulation than many mainstream magazines of similar or greater circulation. UK circulation fell by 3.2% in 2014, but stronger international sales increased the circulation to 129,585.

A monthly Dutch edition of New Scientist was launched in June 2015. It replaced the former Natuurwetenschap & Techniek (NWT) magazine, adopting its staff and subscribers. The editorially independent magazine is published by Veen Media. It contains mainly translations of articles in the English-language edition, but also its own articles. These are typically focused on research in the Netherlands and Belgium, the main countries where it is purchased.

=== Modern format ===
In the 21st century, until May 2019, New Scientist contained the following sections: Leader, News (Upfront), Technology, Opinion (interviews, point-of-view articles and letters), Features (including cover article), CultureLab (book and event reviews), Feedback (humour), The Last Word (questions and answers) and Jobs & Careers. A Tom Gauld cartoon appears on the Letters page. A readers' letters section discusses recent articles and discussions also take place on the website. Readers contribute observations on examples of pseudoscience to Feedback, and offer questions and answers on scientific and technical topics to Last Word. New Scientist has produced a series of books compiled from contributions to Last Word.

From issue 3228 of 4 May 2019, New Scientist introduced a "slightly updated design, with ... a fresher, brighter feel". A dedicated "Views" section was added between news reports and in-depth features, including readers' letters, comment, and reviews on science, culture and society. Regular columnists were introduced, and columns in the culture pages. The light-hearted "Back Pages" includes the long-standing Feedback and The Last Word, puzzles, and a Q&A section.

== Staff and contributors ==
=== Editors of New Scientist ===
- Percy Cudlipp (1956–1962)
- Nigel Calder (1962–1966)
- Donald Gould (1966–1969)
- Bernard Dixon (1969–1979)
- Michael Kenward (1979–1990)
- David Dickson (1990–1992)
- Alun Anderson (1992–1999)
- Jeremy Webb (1999–2008)
- Roger Highfield (2008–2011)
- Sumit Paul-Choudhury (2011–2018)
- Emily Wilson (2018–2023)
- Catherine de Lange (2023–)

== Spin-offs ==
New Scientist has published books derived from its content, many of which are selected questions and answers from the "Last Word" section of the magazine and website:

- 1998. The Last Word. ISBN 978-0-19-286199-3
- 2000. The Last Word 2. ISBN 978-0-19-286204-4
- 2005. Does Anything Eat Wasps?. ISBN 978-1-86197-973-5
- 2006. Why Don't Penguins' Feet Freeze?. (selections from the first two books) ISBN 978-1-86197-876-9
- 2007. How to Fossilise Your Hamster. ISBN 978-1-84668-044-1
- 2008. Do Polar Bears Get Lonely?. ISBN 978-1-84668-130-1
- 2009. How to Make a Tornado: The strange and wonderful things that happen when scientists break free. ISBN 978-1-84668-287-2
- 2010. Why Can't Elephants Jump?. ISBN 978-1-84668-398-5
- 2011. Why Are Orangutans Orange?: science questions in picture. ISBN 978-1-84668-507-1
- 2012. Will We Ever Speak Dolphin?. ISBN 978-1-78125-026-6
- 2014. Question Everything. ISBN 978-1-78125-164-5

Since 2016 New Scientist has held an annual science festival in London. Styled New Scientist Live, the event has attracted high-profile scientists and science presenters.

== Criticism ==
=== Greg Egan's criticism of the EmDrive article ===
In September 2006, New Scientist was criticised by science fiction writer Greg Egan, who wrote that "a sensationalist bent and a lack of basic knowledge by its writers" was making the magazine's coverage sufficiently unreliable "to constitute a real threat to the public understanding of science". In particular, Egan found himself "gobsmacked by the level of scientific illiteracy" in the magazine's coverage of Roger Shawyer's "electromagnetic drive", where New Scientist allowed the publication of "meaningless double-talk" designed to bypass a fatal objection to Shawyer's proposed space drive, namely that it violates the law of conservation of momentum. Egan urged others to write to New Scientist and pressure the magazine to raise its standards, instead of "squandering the opportunity that the magazine's circulation and prestige provides". The editor of New Scientist, then Jeremy Webb, replied defending the article, saying that it is "an ideas magazine—that means writing about hypotheses as well as theories".

== See also ==
- Citizen science – first use of this term was in New Scientist in October 1979
- List of scientific journals
- Nominative determinism – first use of this term was in New Scientist in December 1994
