= Grimbledon Down =

British comic strip in the New Scientist

Grimbledon Down is a comic strip by British cartoonist Bill Tidy. It ran in New Scientist magazine from 26 March 1970 until 26 March 1994.

== Description ==
The strip was set in a fictitious UK government research laboratory, satirising the secret Porton Down chemical and biological warfare establishment. (New Scientist wanted 'some straight talking about the scope and purpose of research on Porton Down'.) Grimbledon Down's scientists engaged in all sorts of questionable research, such as the production of antipornography – grossly disgusting pornographic films which were intended to turn off the audience's sexual drive and thus save the world from catastrophic overpopulation. Another frequent feature was attempts to create or distribute Nu-Food, an artificial foodstuff made with processed human waste.

Very little of Grimbledon Down's internal organisation was ever revealed, although "BioWar" and "ChemWar" divisions were mentioned from time to time in the characters' dialogue. The man in charge was a recurring character – Director Treem (no first name given) – a moustachioed dark-haired man in a chalk pinstripe business suit. Treem was apparently not a scientist, as the scientists were drawn wearing white lab coats, but he once described himself as a former potential Nobel Prize candidate, was scientifically literate, and often got into detailed technical discussions with his staff.
