= Bill Tidy =

British cartoonist (1933–2023)

Bill Tidy MBE
- Born: William Edward Tidy; 9 October 1933 Tranmere, Cheshire, England
- Died: 11 March 2023 (aged 89)
- Areas: Cartoonist, Writer, Artist
- Notable works: The Cloggies; The Fosdyke Saga
- Awards: MBE (2000)

William Edward Tidy, MBE (9 October 1933 – 11 March 2023) was a British cartoonist, writer and television personality, known chiefly for his comic strips. He was noted for his charitable work, particularly for the Lord's Taverners, which he supported for over 30 years. Deeply proud of his working-class roots in Northern England, his most abiding cartoon strips, such as The Cloggies and The Fosdyke Saga, were set in an exaggerated version of that environment.

Tidy was appointed Member of the Order of the British Empire (MBE) in the 2001 New Year Honours for services to journalism.

== Early life ==
Tidy was born in Tranmere, a suburb of Birkenhead, Cheshire, on 9 October 1933. He was brought up in Liverpool, where he was educated to the age of 15 at St Margaret's Church of England Academy (then St Margaret's Technical Commercial School), Anfield. His first published cartoon appeared in the school magazine.

After working in a shipping office Tidy joined the Royal Engineers in 1952. He sold his first cartoon to a Japanese newspaper in 1955 and in the same year left the army. He found work in a Liverpool advertising agency the following year, where he drew illustrations for advertisements in magazines. Despite having no formal artistic training, he began to sell cartoons on a freelance basis and soon left the agency to work full-time as a professional cartoonist.

== Career ==
As Tidy's work became better known and began to be published in the Daily Sketch and Daily Mirror, he moved to London where, together with a number of his contemporaries in Fleet Street, he formed the British Cartoonists' Association. Tidy is known for his cartoon strips — The Cloggies ran from 1967 to 1981 in the fortnightly satirical magazine Private Eye, and The Fosdyke Saga was published daily in the Daily Mirror from 1971 to 1984; the latter was a parody of The Forsyte Saga, set in the industrial north instead of a genteel upper-class environment. This was broadcast as a radio series in 42 parts by the BBC from 1983, with additional scripting by John Junkin. It also became a stage play with Tidy working in co-operation with playwright Alan Plater. Tidy restarted producing the Fosdyke Saga cartoon strip on his own website where he also offered a variety of his works for sale.

Other cartoon strip series and individual cartoons have been published in many other newspapers and magazines, including New Scientist (Grimbledon Down for 24 years), What's Brewing (CAMRA's monthly magazine), and Punch. When Punch ceased publication, Tidy attempted to buy the title. He also wrote 20 books and illustrated 70.

Tidy's many TV appearances have included Countdown, Watercolour Challenge, Through the Keyhole, Blankety Blank and Countryfile. His radio appearances included an accomplished performance on a 1989 edition of I'm Sorry I Haven't a Clue, when he stood in for Barry Cryer and a 1991 series where he stood in for Tim Brooke-Taylor. He wrote and presented Draw Me, a children's television series in 13 parts. He was the subject of This Is Your Life in 1975 when he was surprised by Eamonn Andrews.

Between 1985 and 1993, Tidy was a frequent celebrity guest in 'Dictionary Corner' on the long-running Channel 4 gameshow Countdown.

== Personal life ==
Tidy died on 11 March 2023, at the age of 89.
