= National Museum of Technology =

Coordinates: 52°13′54″N 21°00′23″E

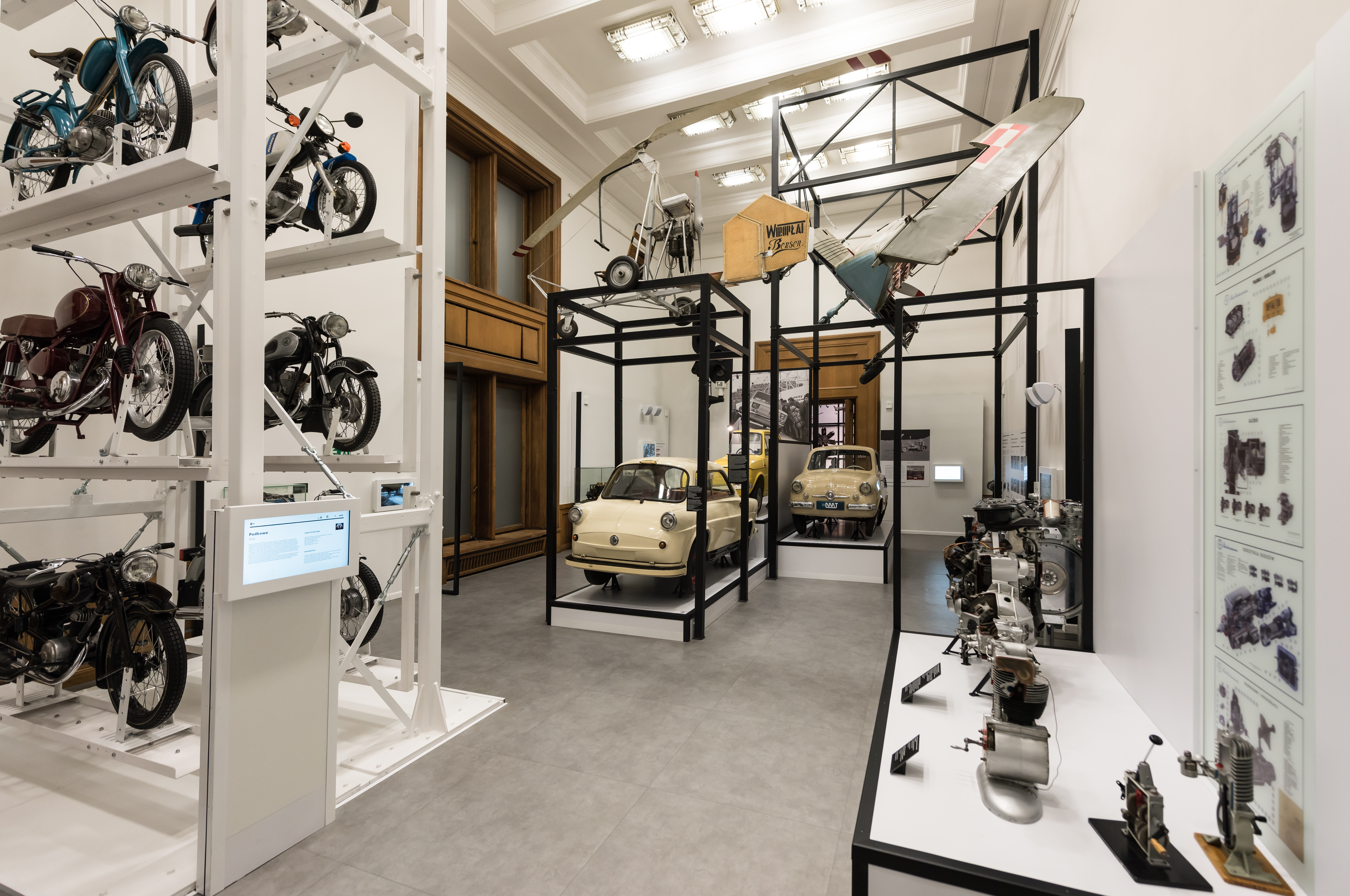
- Established: 1950
- Location: Palace of Culture & Science; Warsaw, Poland
- Type: science museum
- Public transit access: Centrum
- Website: nmt.waw.pl

National Museum of Technology is a museum in Warsaw, Poland. It was established in 1955. It is located in the Palace of Culture & Science.

Exhibits include motorbikes, aeroplanes, 19th century musical boxes, and historic cars.
