= Eser =

Eser may refer to:

- ESER, a German abbreviation for a Comecon computer standard
- Eser (name)
- Eser, a member of the Socialist-Revolutionary Party (from the Russian-language initialism SR)
- A member of A Just Russia party (from the Russian-language initialism of "Spravedlivaya Rossiya")
