= A5120 =

A5120 may refer to:

- A 5120, a microcomputer manufactured by VEB Robotron in East Germany
- A5120 road, an A-class road in England
