= VEB Robotron =

East German manufacturer of computers and consumer electronics

VEB Kombinat Robotron

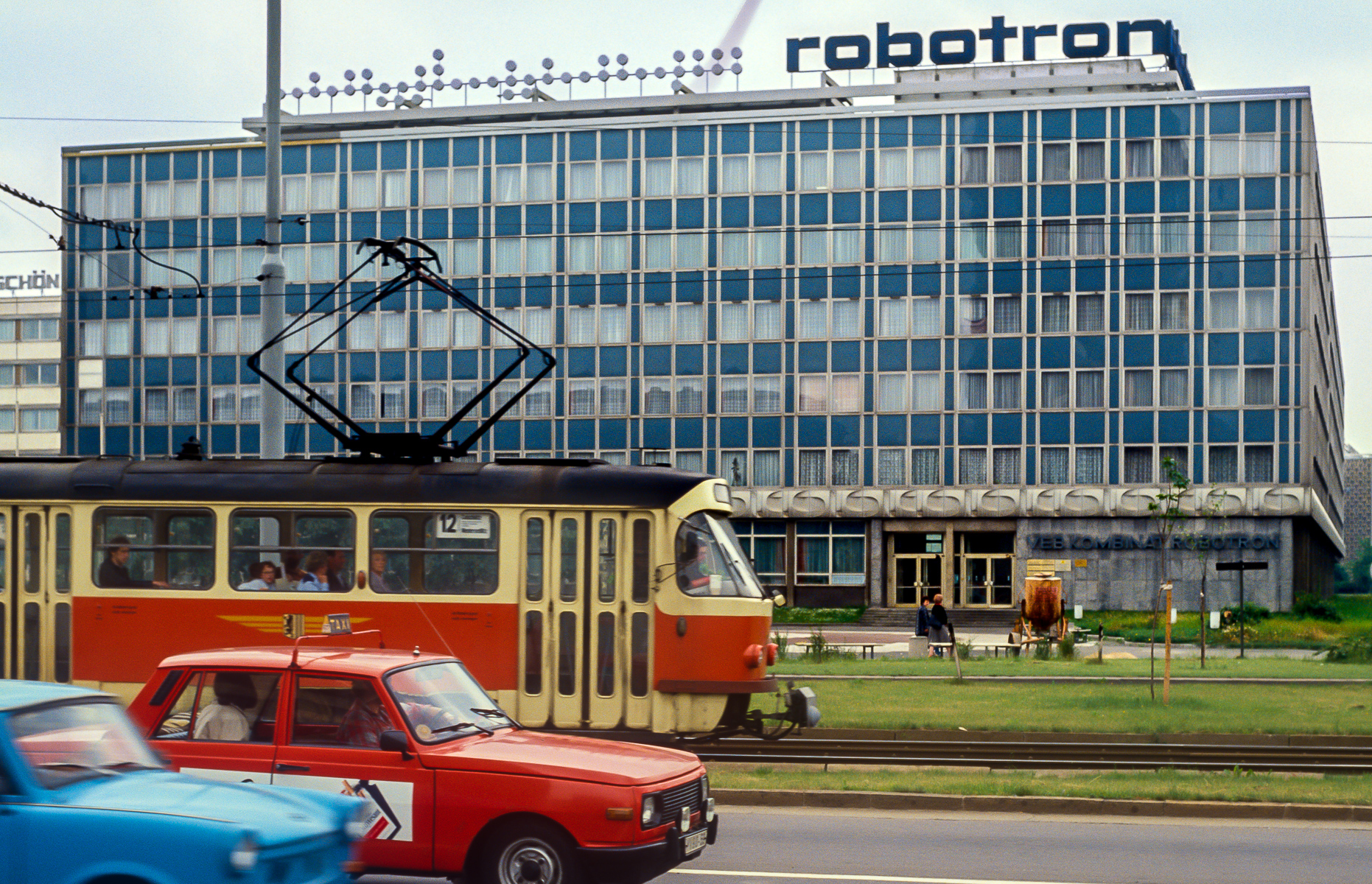
- Type: Volkseigener Betrieb
- Industry: Electronics manufacturer, computer software
- Founded: 1 April 1969; 57 years ago in Dresden, German Democratic Republic
- Defunct: 1 July 1990
- Fate: Liquidated / converted into corporations
- Headquarters: Dresden, German Democratic Republic
- Key people: Friedrich Wokurka
- Products: A 5120, PC 1715, Robotron K 1840, Robotron KC 87, …
- Number of employees: 68,000 (1989)

VEB Kombinat Robotron (German: [vaʊ eː beː kɔmbɪnaːt ʁobotʁɔn]) (or simply Robotron) was the largest East German electronics manufacturer. It was headquartered in Dresden and employed 68,000 people in 1989. Its products included personal computers, SM EVM minicomputers, the ESER mainframe computers, various computer peripherals as well as microcomputers, radios, television sets and other items including cookie press Kleingebäckpresse Typ 102.

== Divisions ==
Robotron managed several different divisions:

- VEB Robotron-Elektronik Dresden (headquarters) — typewriters, personal computers, minicomputers, mainframes
- VEB Robotron-Meßelektronik Dresden — measurement and testing devices, home computers
- VEB Robotron-Projekt Dresden — software department
- VEB Robotron-Buchungsmaschinenwerk Karl-Marx-Stadt — personal computers, floppy disk drives
- VEB Robotron-Elektronik Hoyerswerda — monitors, power supply units
- VEB Robotron-Elektronik Radeberg — mainframes, radio receivers, portable television receivers, directional radio systems
- VEB Robotron Vertrieb Dresden, Berlin and Erfurt — sales departments
- VEB Robotron-Elektronik Zella-Mehlis — computer terminals, hard disk drives
- VEB Robotron-Büromaschinenwerk Sömmerda — personal computers, printers, electronic calculators (Soemtron 220, 222, 224), invoicing machines (EFA 380), punched card indexers and sorters (Soemtron 432).
- VEB Robotron Elektronik Riesa — printed circuit boards
- VEB Robotron-Anlagenbau Leipzig — general contractor, design and assembly for computer and process calculation systems in the GDR and export, training center

On 30 June 1990, Kombinat Robotron was liquidated and its divisions were converted into corporations. In the 1990s, these companies were sold, e.g. to Siemens Nixdorf and IBM, or liquidated. Less than five percent of the employees were able to switch to successor companies. However, the abundance of highly qualified workers promoted the subsequent settlement of various companies in the region.

Robotron Datenbank-Software GmbH is a company which emerged from one of the former divisions of Kombinat Robotron. It was newly founded on 23 August 1990, just before German reunification.

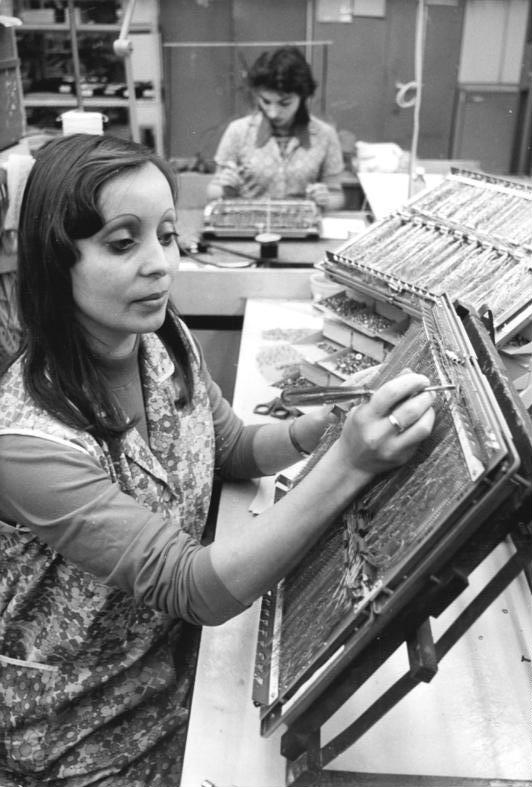
Final assembly at VEB Robotron Elektronik Dresden, 1981

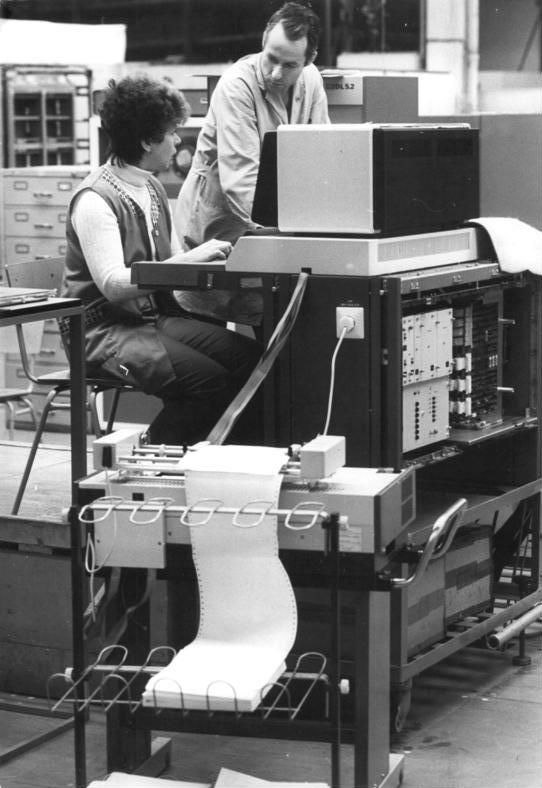
Quality conformance testing at VEB Robotron Elektronik Dresden, 1984

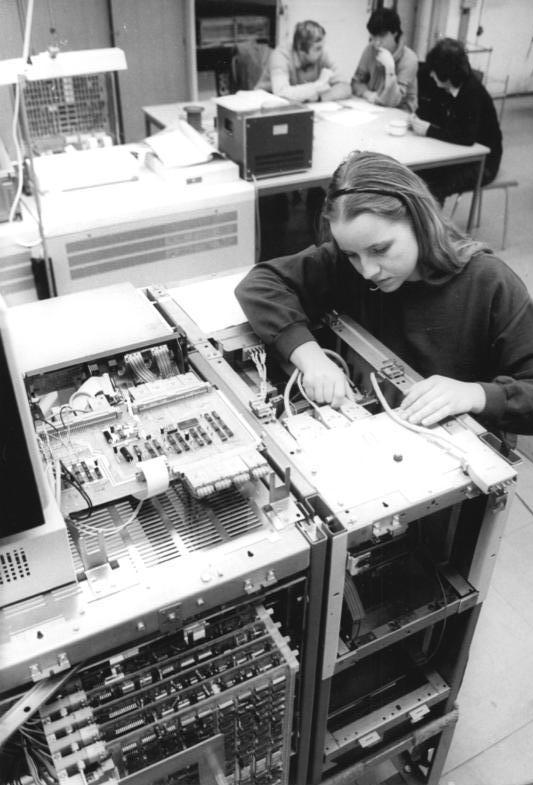
A worker at an assembly plant producing the ES 2655 mainframe in 1985

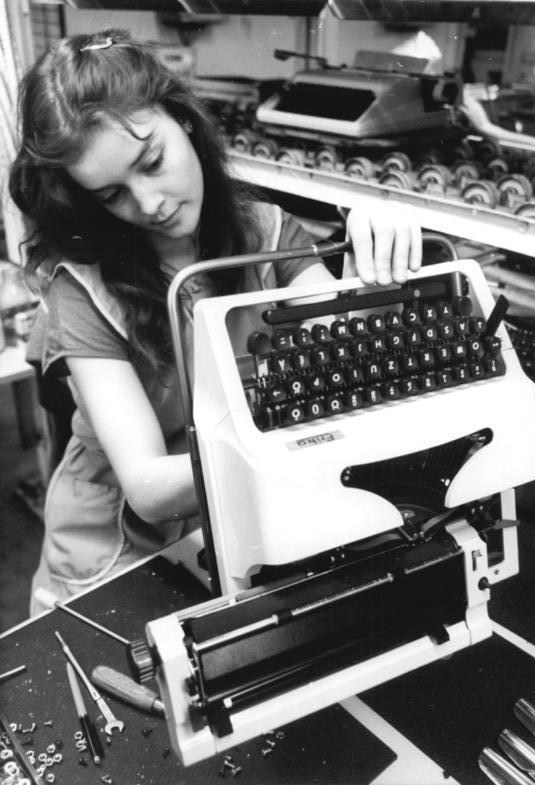
One of 17,000 assembly workers at Robotron in 1987 working a weekend to make typewriters

== Robotron hardware and software ==
Robotron product series include:

- Midrange computer EDVA Robotron 300 (based on IBM 1401),
- R 4000 and R 4200 computers (based on Honeywell Series 16),
- ES EVM systems EC 1040, EC 1055, EC 1056, EC 1057 (based on IBM System/360, IBM System/370),
- Minicomputer and Superminicomputer K 1600 (DEC PDP-11), K 1840 (VAX 11/780), K 1820 (MicroVAX II),
- Office and personal computers A 5120, PC 1715, A 7100, A 7150, BIC A 5105, EC 1834 (IBM XT), EC 1835 (IBM AT),
- OEM modular microcomputer systems K 1510, K 1520, K 1700
- Operating systems such as Single User Control Program (based on CP/M), JAMB, Disk Control Program [de] (based on MS-DOS), KOBRA and SIOS (an in-house development).
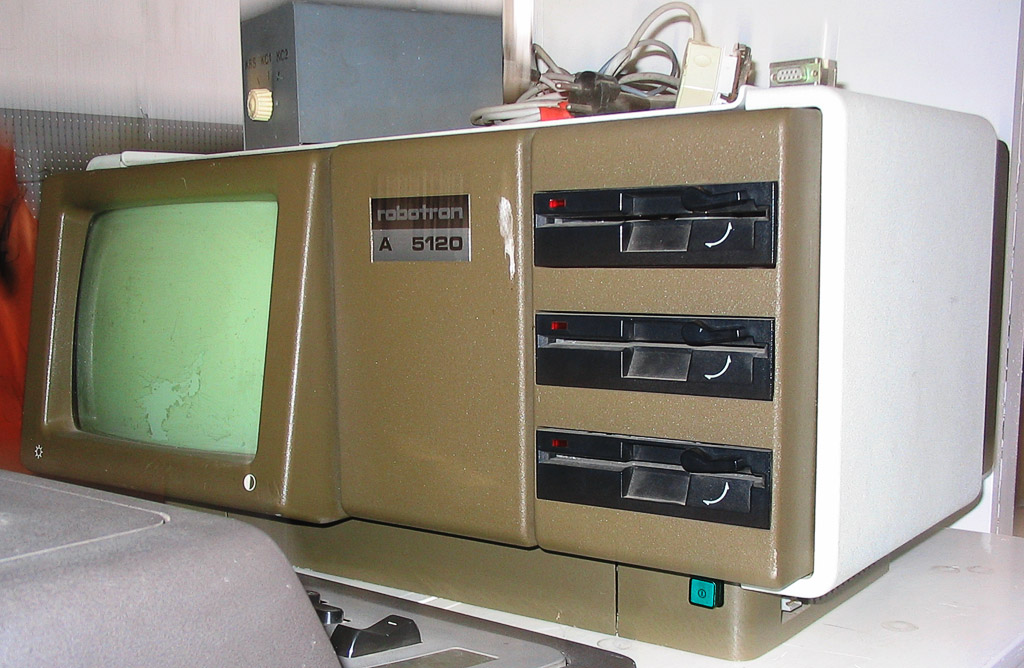
Robotron A 5120 office computer, 1982

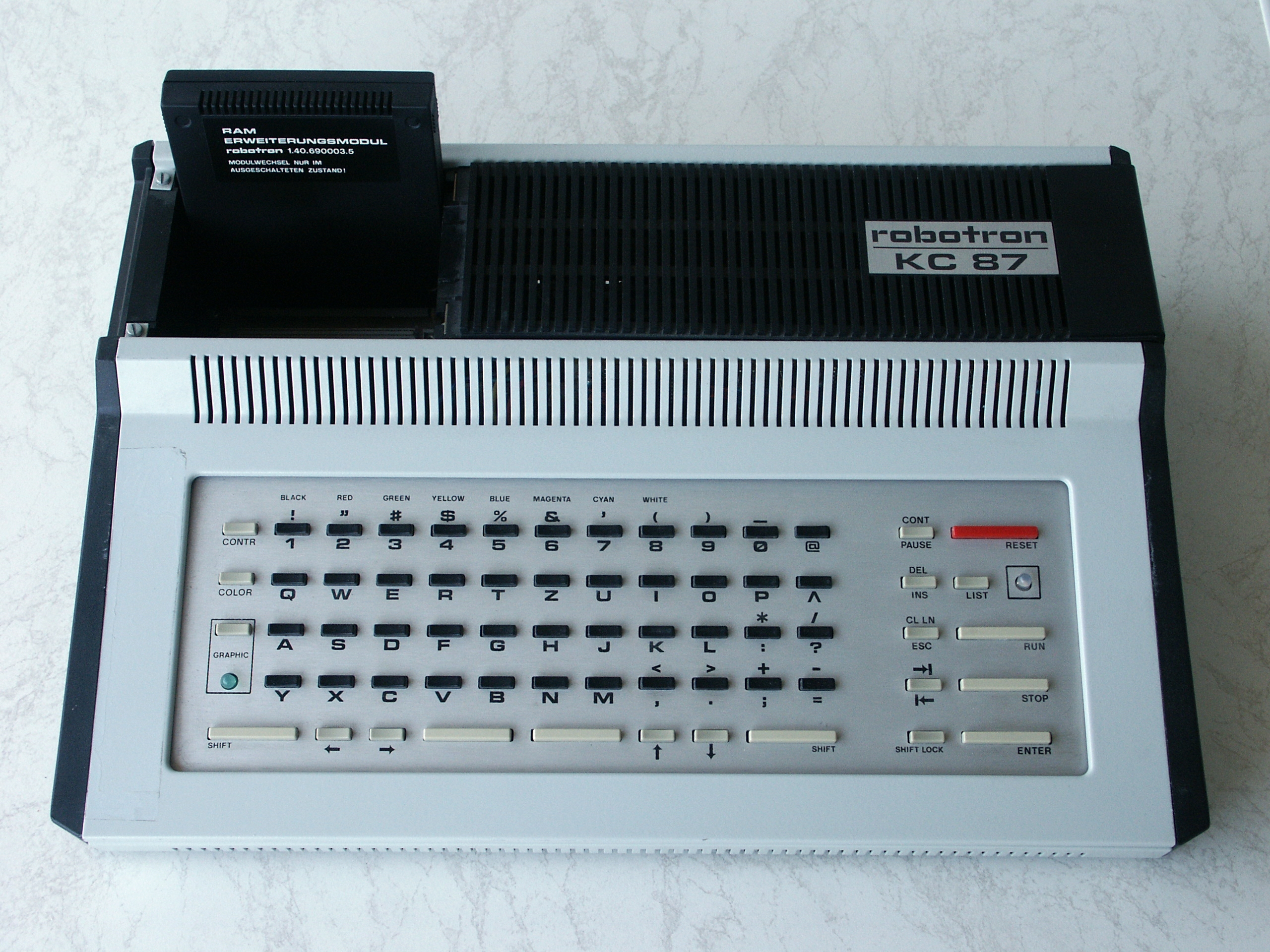
Robotron KC 87 microcomputer, 1987

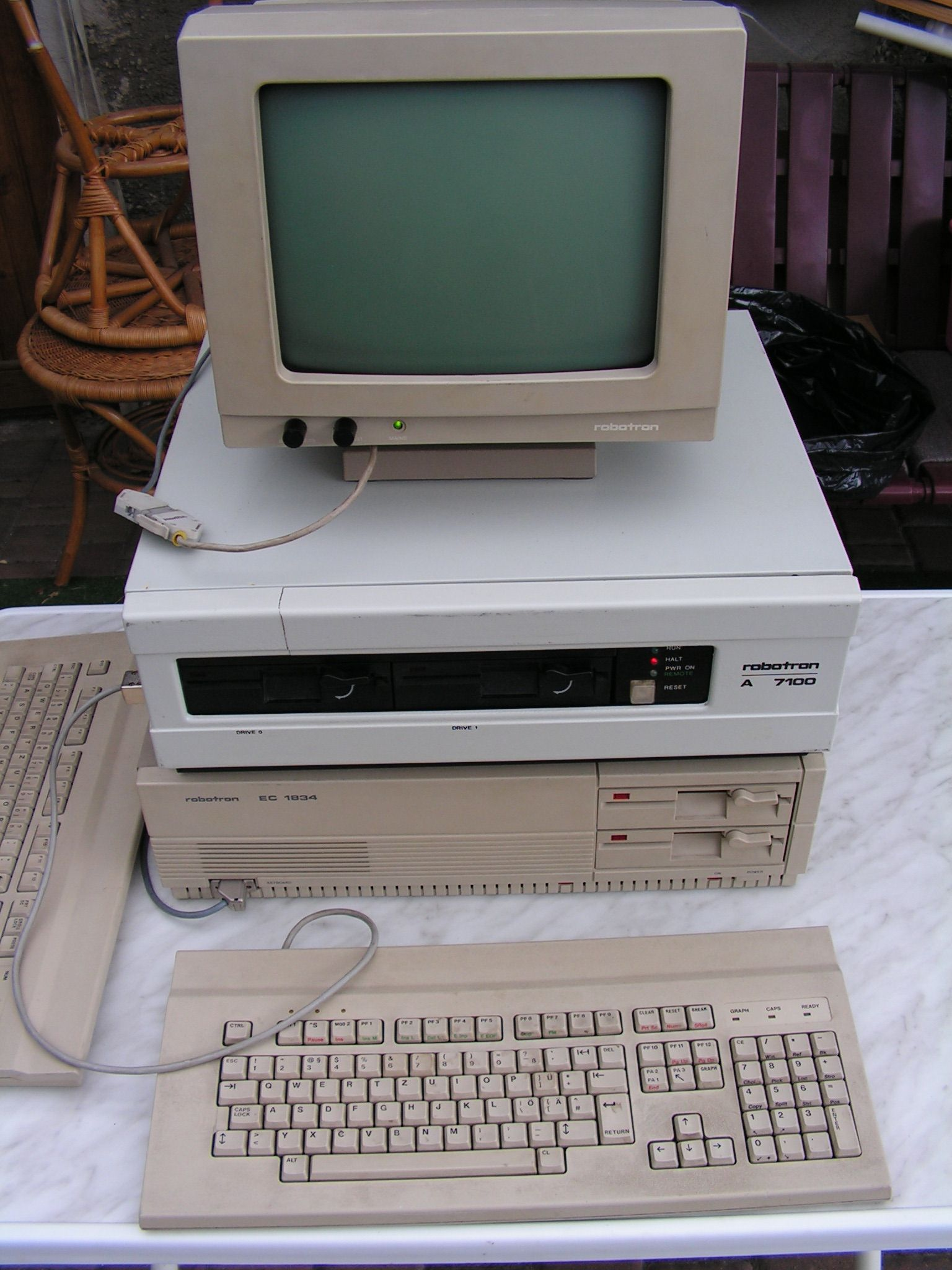
Robotron A 7100 and EC 1834 (XT-compatible) personal computer, 1986

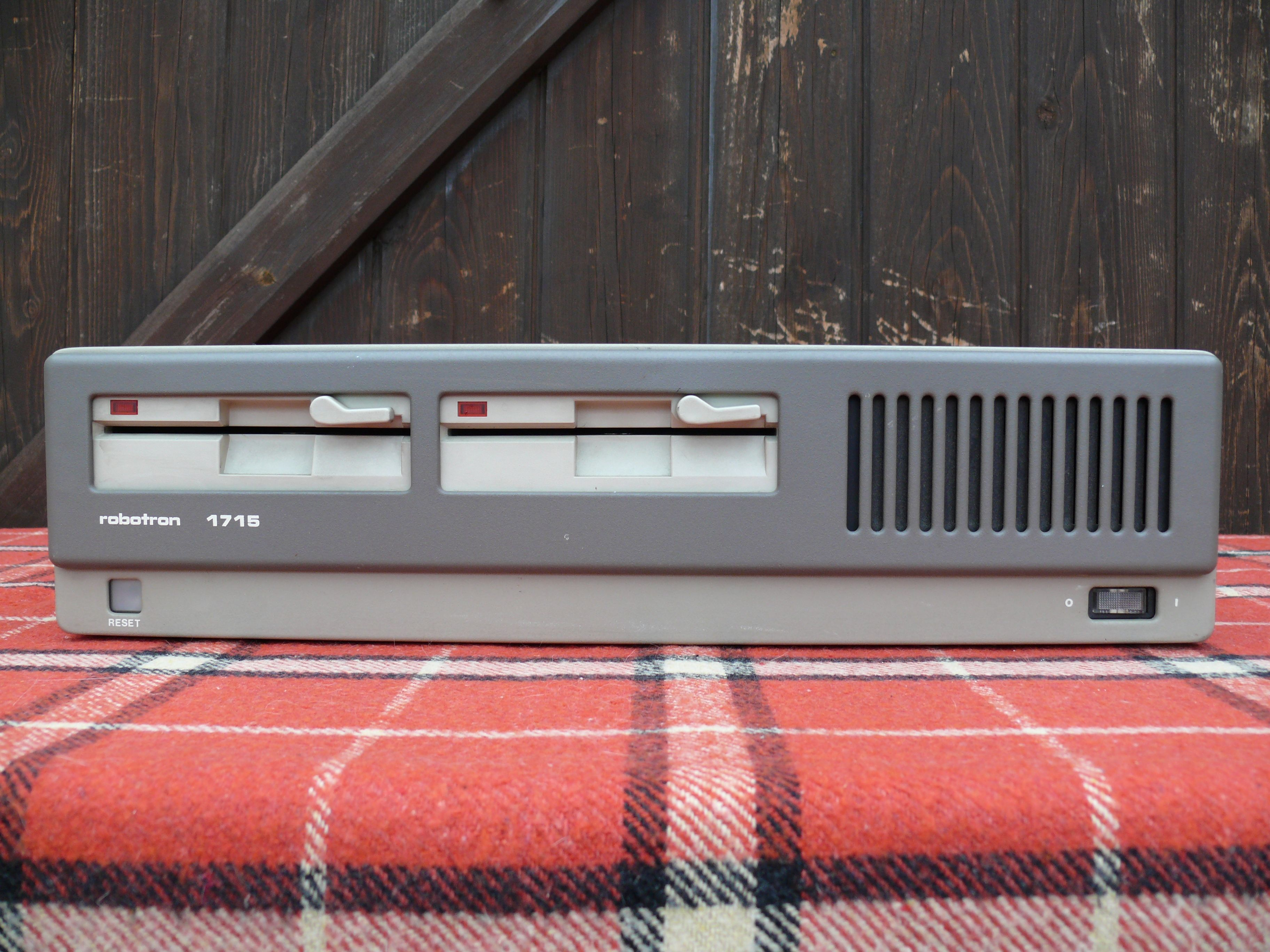
Robotron PC 1715 office computer, 1985

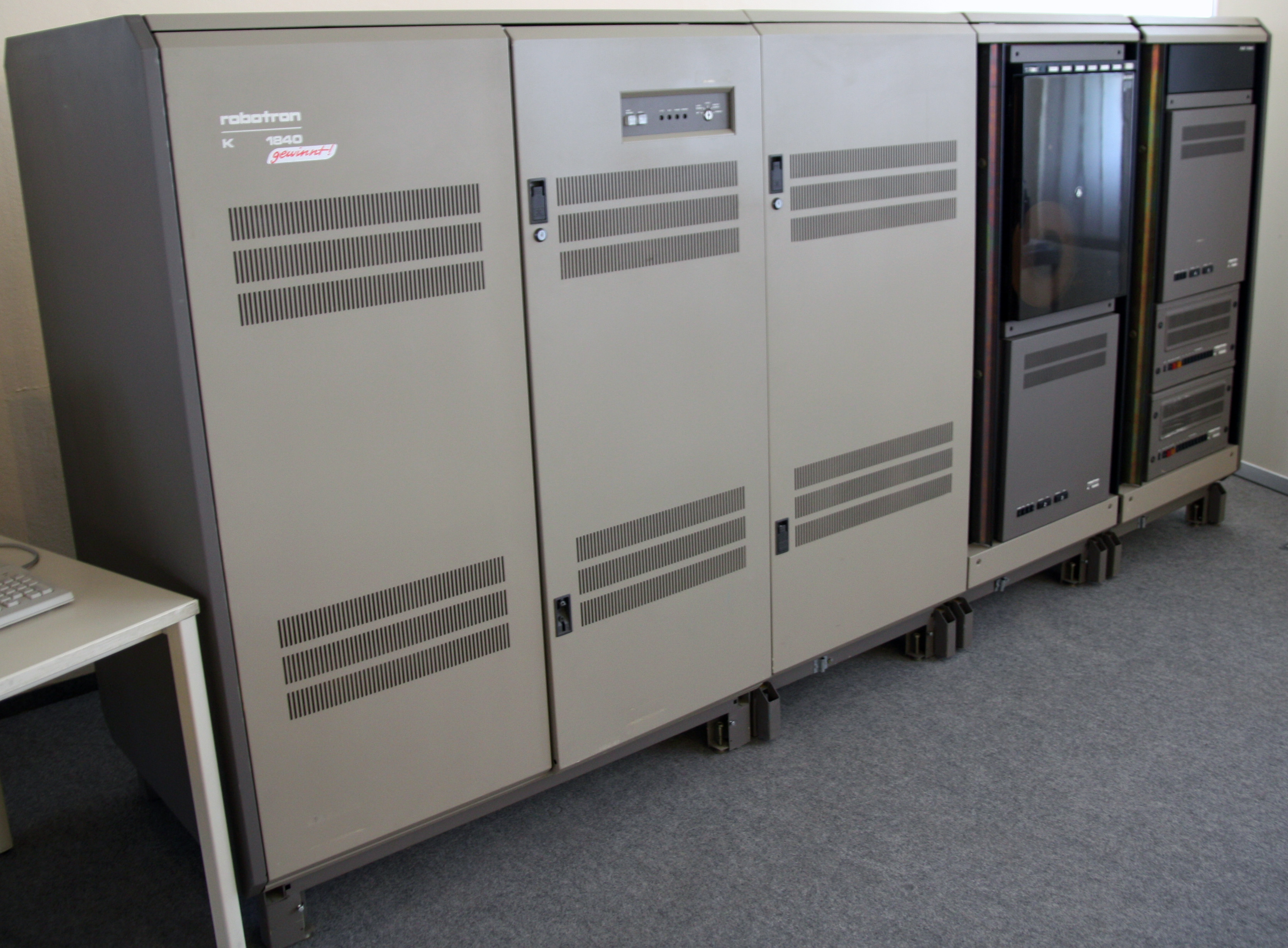
Robotron RVS K 1840 (SM 1710), DEC VAX-11/780 Clone, 1988, recorded in the Technical Collections Dresden

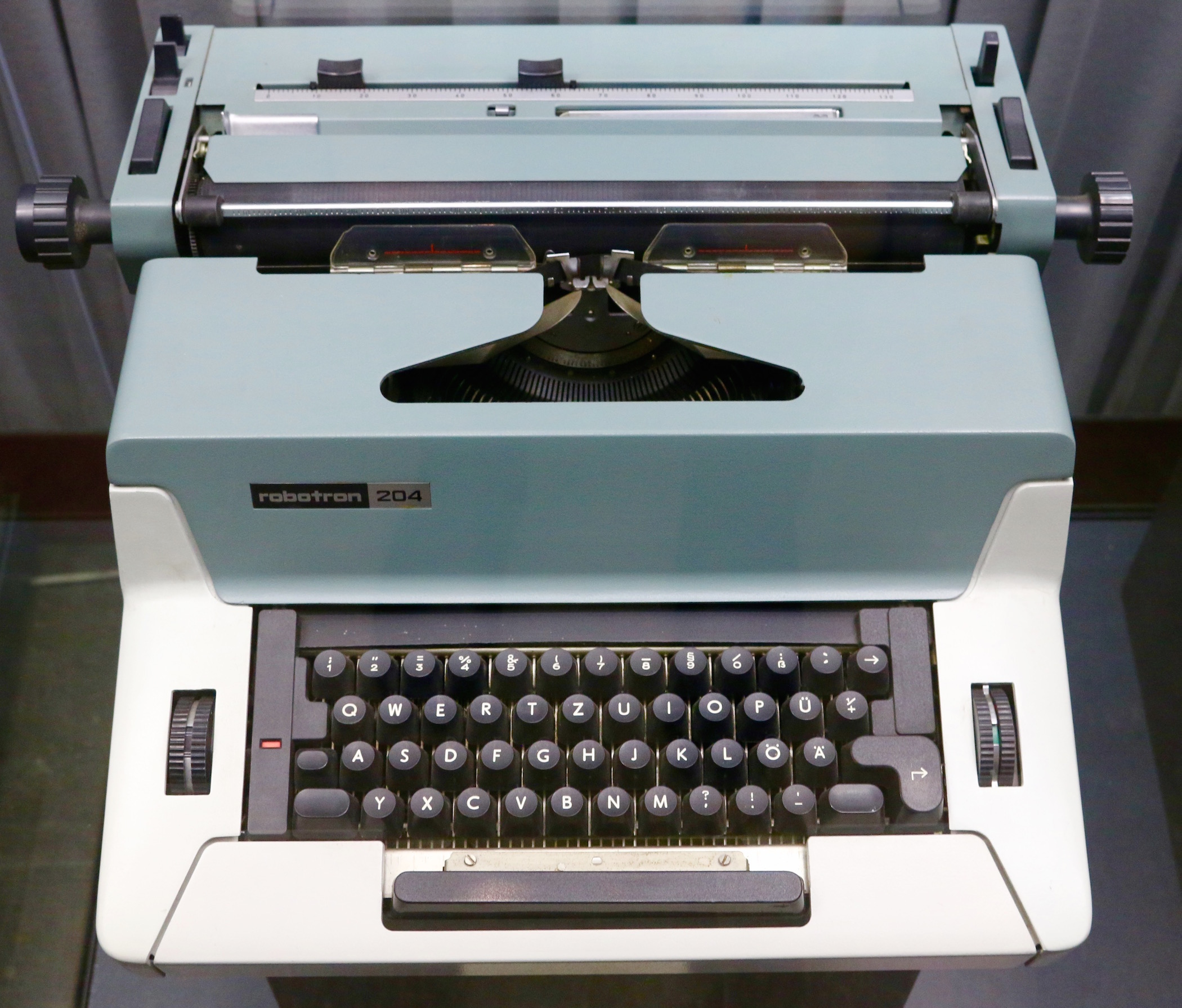
A Robotron Optima 204 electric typewriter from the 1980s

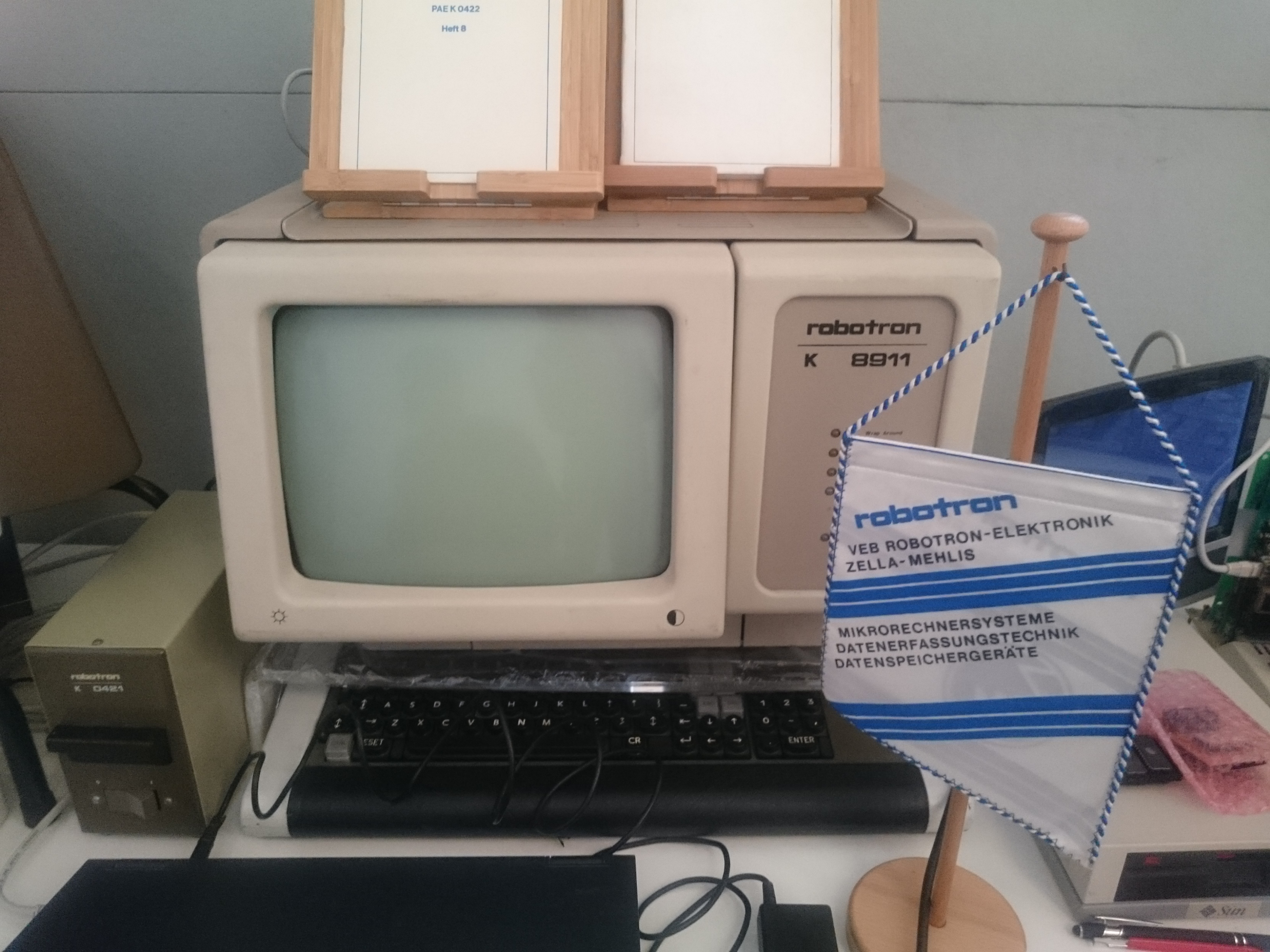
VEB Robotron K 8911 terminal, ~1981

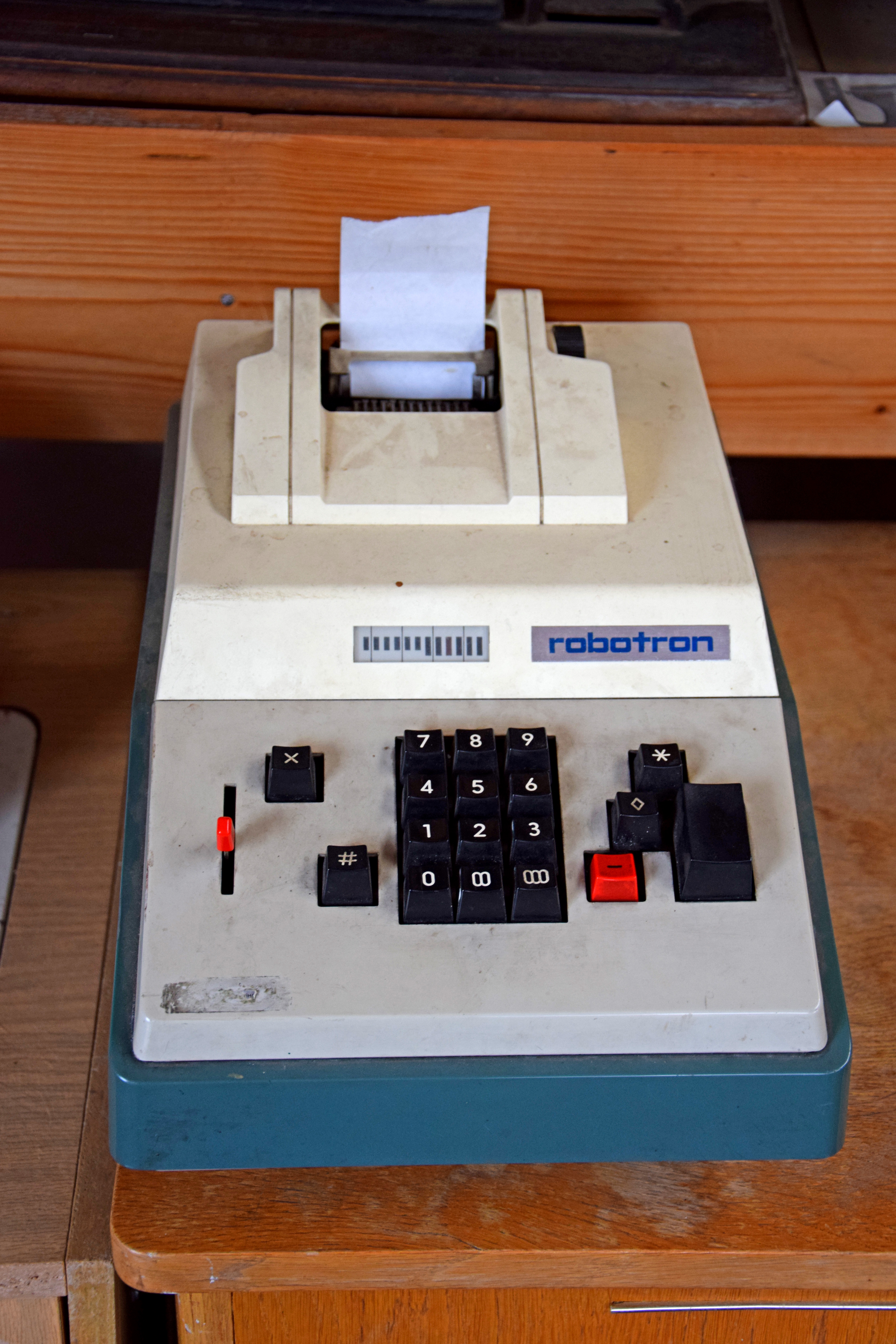
Robotron calculator with a printer

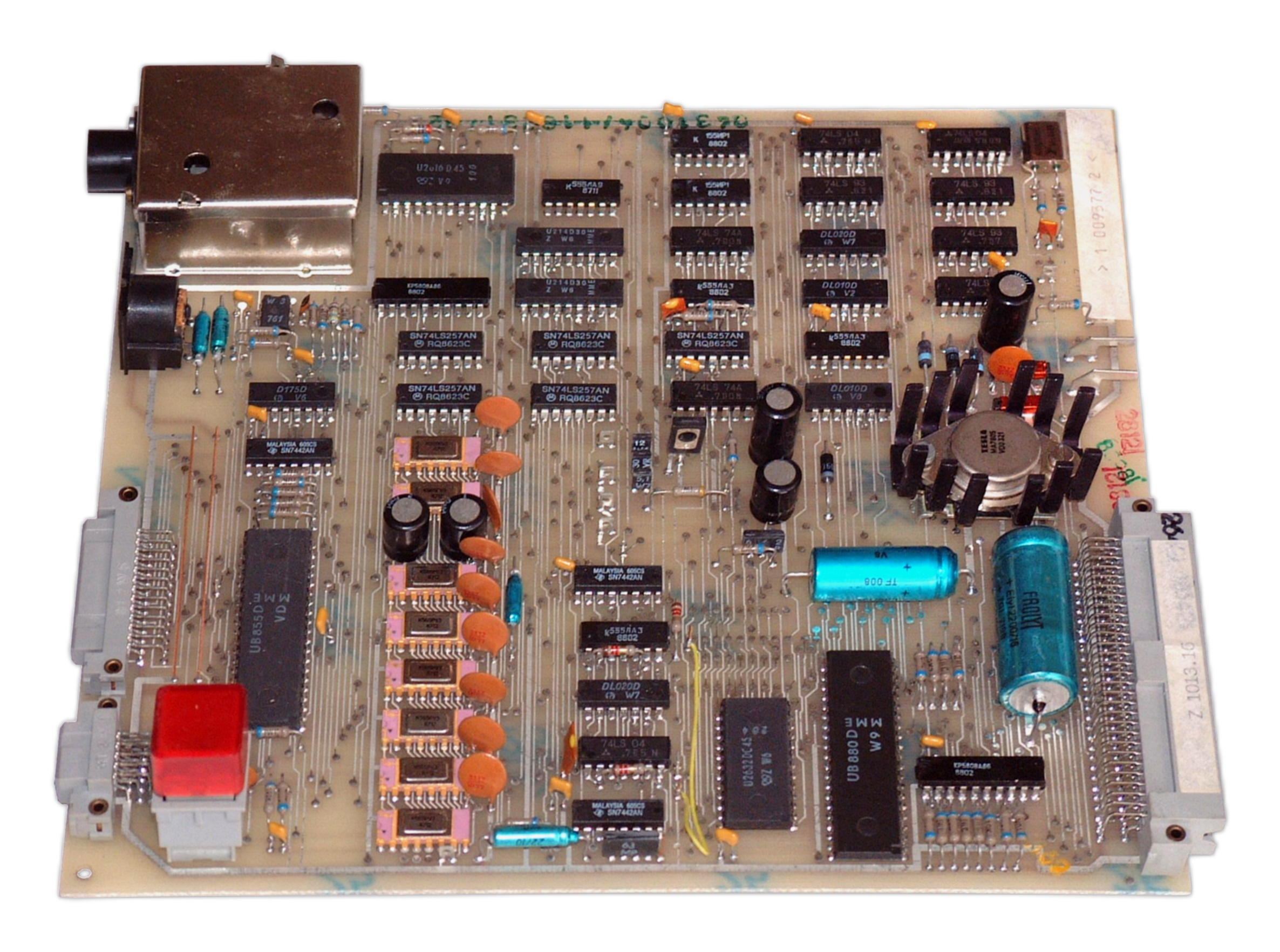
Robotron Z1013 single-board microcomputer kit, 1985

== Rebranding of products ==
Robotron printers were sold in Western Germany as Soemtron or Präsident, and the West German branch of Commodore used some Robotron parts for their printers.

In East Germany, Epson printers were sold under the Robotron brand that still had the Epson logo on the back.

== K 1520 bus standard ==
The K 1520 bus was an early computer bus, created by VEB Robotron in 1980 and specified in TGL 37271/01. It was the predominant computer bus architecture of microcomputer-sized systems of East Germany, whose industry relied heavily on the U880 microprocessor, a clone of the Zilog Z80.

Among the large number of boards developed using the standard were CPU modules, RAM modules, graphics cards, magnetic tape controllers and floppy disk controllers.

It was originally intended to be used to connect boards to backplanes, as in the K 1520 modular microcomputer system, A 5120 office computer, A 5130 office computer and the Poly-Play arcade cabinet.

But it was also used as an expansion bus for computers that featured a mainboard such as

- PC 1715 office computer - with 2 internal slots, one being occupied by the floppy disk controller
- KC 85/2, KC 85/3, KC 85/4 microcomputers - with two internal slots for expansion cartridges and one back-side connector for:
  - D002 - expansion unit for 4 additional expansion cartridges
  - D004 - a floppy controller subsystem plus 2 cartridge slots
- KC 87 microcomputer - a.k.a. Z 9001 and KC 85/1
- Z 1013, a home computer - consumer product in kit form
- BIC A 5105 [de] educational microcomputer - not produced in significant quantities
- KC compact late home computer - not produced in meaningful quantities

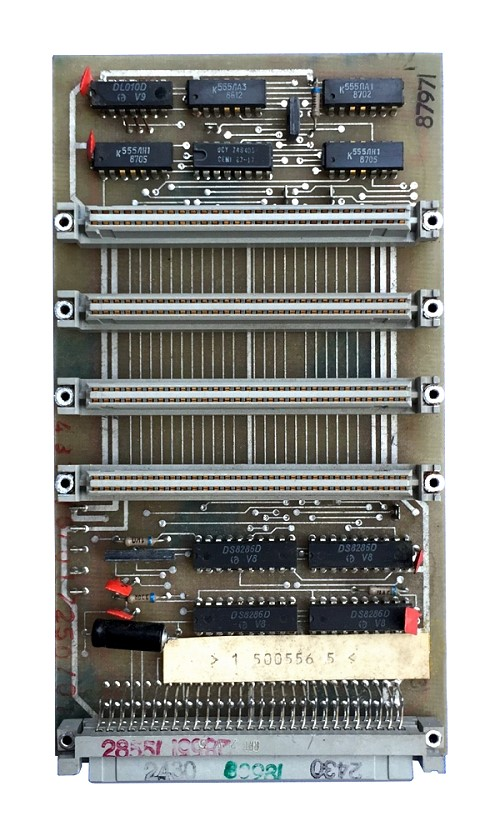
K 1520 bus expansion for Z 1013

The bus had 58 pins and was commonly physically represented by a two-row connector with 29 pins each. The following signals and connections were used:

- DB0 ... DB7 (bidirectional data bus)
- AB0 ... AB15 (address bus)
- /MREQ, /IORQ, /RD, /WR, /RFSH, /M1, /WAIT, /HALT, /INT, /NMI, /BUSRQ, /RESET (Z80 control signals)
- /BAI, /BOA /BUSACK (bus priority chain)
- /IEI, IEO (interrupt enable priority chain)
- /IODI, /MEMDI, /RDY (access control)
- clock, +5V, -5V, +12V, ground

== See also ==
- Rolanet - East German networking standard
- VEB Kombinat Mikroelektronik Erfurt - East German manufacturer of active electronic components
- Electronics industry in East Germany
- Economy of East Germany
- History of computer hardware in Eastern Bloc countries
