= Rolanet =

Rolanet (Robotron Local Area Network) was a networking standard, developed in the former German Democratic Republic (GDR) and introduced in 1987 by the computer manufacturer Robotron. It enabled computer networking over coax cable and glass fiber with a range of 1,000 metres (3,300 ft). Networking speed was 500 kBd, comparable to other standards of the day. A maximum of 253 computers could be connected using Rolanet.

Two variants of Rolanet existed:

- Rolanet 1, introduced in 1987, saw limited deployment;
- Rolanet 2 was planned as a successor to Rolanet 1, but presumably never got beyond the prototype stage.

A scaled-down version of Rolanet, BICNet, was used for educational purposes.

It is no longer possible to assemble a functioning Rolanet system today, due to lack of software and working hardware.
