= Robotron K 1840 =

East German clone of the VAX-11/780 computer

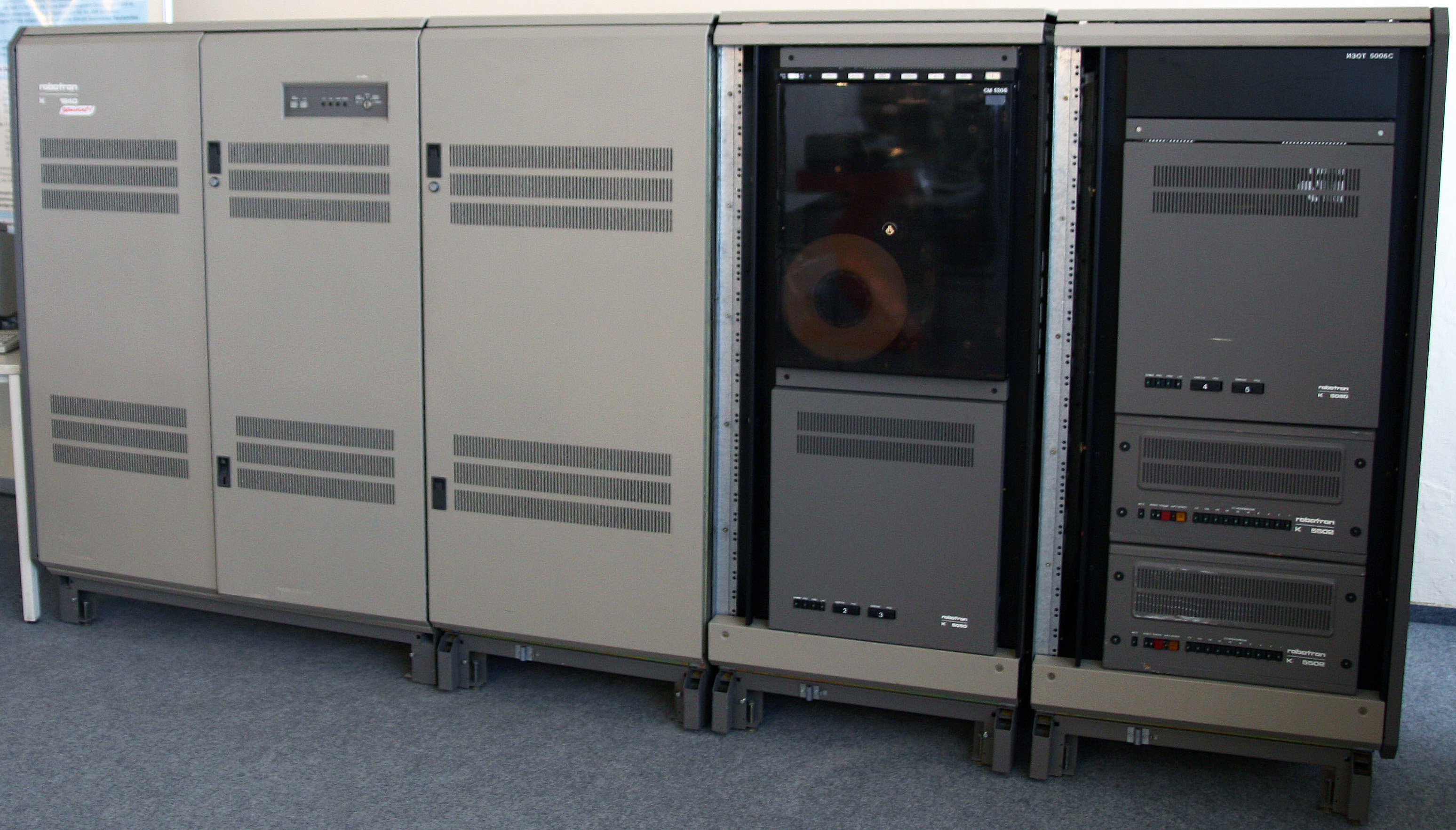
VEB Robotron RVS K 1840 in the Technische Sammlungen Museum, Dresden

The K 1840, full name RVS K 1840 (Rechnersystem mit virtuellem Speicher, "computer system with virtual memory") is a minicomputer from the German Democratic Republic (GDR). Its development began in August 1985 at VEB Robotron Elektronik in Dresden, and it went into production in 1988.

== Minicomputer ==
The K 1840 minicomputer is a clone of VAX-11/780 from Digital Equipment Corporation (DEC). The export of western 32-bit minicomputers to Comecon countries was forbidden by the CoCom technology embargo. Therefore one was developed locally, using computer aided design (CAD) technology based on a 32-bit computer architecture.

The K 1840 is the first 32-bit computer of the M 32 VAX-compatible minicomputer line. Copies of VAX-11/7xx computers are known also from Czechoslovakia (CM 5152), Hungary (TPA-11/540, 560 and 580), Romania (CORAL 8730) and the Soviet Union (CM 1700).

K 1840 has a maximum computing speed of 1.1 MIPS; it can access up to 16 MiB of main memory and up to 4 GiB of virtual memory.

The first prototype with the essential core components was introduced in April 1987, and five more were built from then until September 1987. The new computer was presented to the public in October 1987. In 1988 it was awarded the National Prize of the GDR, 1st class, and a gold medal at the Leipzig spring fair. Production started in June 1988 and 217 machines were delivered at a price of 1.9 million Mark up to 1990.

While the K 1840 was under development, its successor (the K 1845, based on the VAX-11/785) had already been conceived. The K 1845 was presented to the public at the Leipzig spring fair in 1990. It has a larger main storage capacity (up to 64 MiB) and can handle more bus adaptors and controllers than its predecessor. Twenty prototypes were built.

A further successor was contemplated: the K 1850, with a performance of 6 MIPS, using emitter-coupled logic (ECL) gate arrays.

Robotron developed a copy of the MicroVAX II called the K 1820, which reaches approximately 90% of the performance of the K 1840. The K 1820 is fully compatible with the software of the K 1840, so that already-developed system and application software can be used.

In mid-1990, production of the K 1840 and K 1845 and all development work stopped, because economical production was not feasible under free-market conditions resulting from the currency, economic and social union of East and West Germany on 1 July 1990, causing the collapse of Robotron's traditional markets in the Soviet Union and East Europe.

There are K 1840s in the Technische Sammlungen Museum in Dresden, in the Konrad-Zuse-Computermuseum in Hoyerswerda and in the Computer History Museum in Mountain View, California, US.
