= A 5120 =

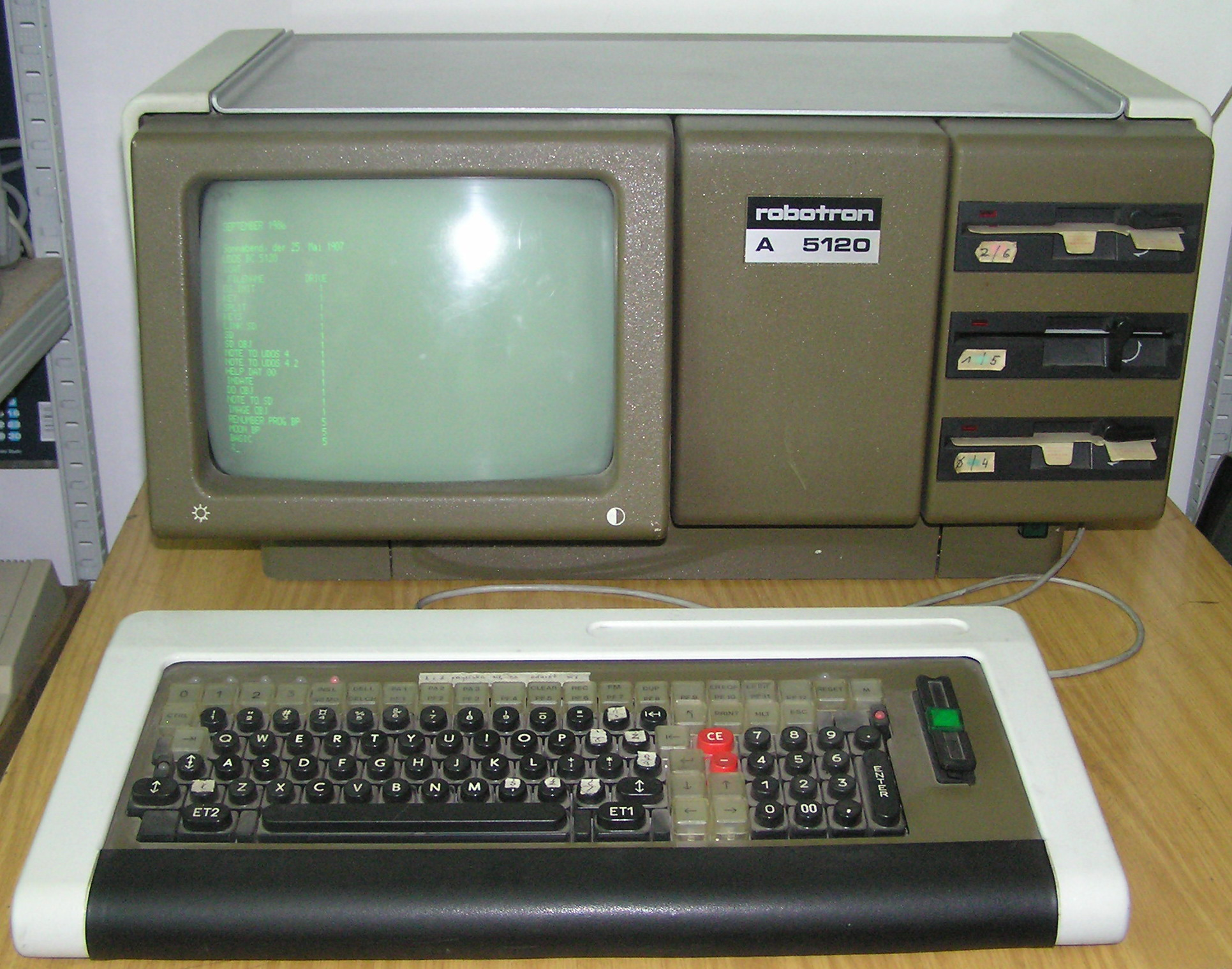
- Manufacturer: VEB Robotron
- Released: A5120: 1982; A5120.16: 1986
- Introductory price: A 5120: 27,000-40,000 marks; A 5120.16: 32,000-48,000 marks
- Units shipped: 17,000 (A 5120 and A 5120.16)
- Operating system: SCP (CP/M clone), UDOS (Z80-RIO clone)
- CPU: A 5120: U880 (8-bit Z80 clone) at 2.5 MHz; A 5120.16: U8000 (16-bit Z8000 clone)
- Memory: A 5120: normally 16KB-64KB, more possible; A 5120.16: 256KB
- Storage: two cassette drives, then later one 8" floppy drive, or up to three 5.25" floppy drives
- Display: Integrated monochrome monitor
- Platform: K 1520 bus
- Successor: PC 1715

The A 5120 was an office computer produced by VEB Robotron in Karl-Marx-Stadt (now Chemnitz), East Germany starting in 1982. The system featured an 8-bit microprocessor, the U880. It was built for office work and had minimal graphics and sound capabilities. The price was between 27,000 and 40,000 East German marks (around 24,000-35,000 2016 US dollars) depending on equipment.

In 1986, a new version was produced, the A 5120.16. The system was identical to the A 5120, with the addition of two additional boards, one with a U8000 16-bit microprocessor (a Zilog Z8000 clone), and one with 256KB DRAM. The original 8-bit system functioned as an I/O subsystem. In this configuration it could run the relatively powerful MUTOS8000 (Unix System III derivative). The price of this model was between about 32,000 and 48,000 East German marks.

In total, about 17,000 A 5120 and A 5120.16 units were manufactured.

In March 1983, a stamp was issued by the German Democratic Republic featuring the A 5120. 4.5 million copies were printed.

An A 5120 was featured in the 2015 television show Deutschland 83 as an example of technological disparity between East and West Germany in the early 1980s.

== Technical details ==
The original A 5120 had two U880 (Zilog Z80 clone) 8-bit processors, running at 2.25 MHz or 2.5 MHz. One was dedicated to I/O, while the other was used for normal work. Each was capable of about 625,000 operations per second. It normally came with 16KB of RAM, but a few units shipped with less. When higher-capacity DRAM chips became available, most units shipped with at least 64KB, and some with as much as 112KB.

The A 5120.16 upgrade included two new circuit boards, one with a 16-bit U8001 processor (clone of Zilog Z8000), and the other with 256KB of additional RAM. The original 8-bit system functioned as a terminal to the 16-bit system.

For storage, the first A 5120 units had dual magnetic cassette drives, but when the floppy disk version became available, all of these units were converted. The first floppy disk version of the machine included an 8-inch floppy disk drive, with two additional 8-inch drives available in a separate unit. Later, the A 5120 included up to three 5.25-inch drives in place of the 8-inch drive.

== Images ==
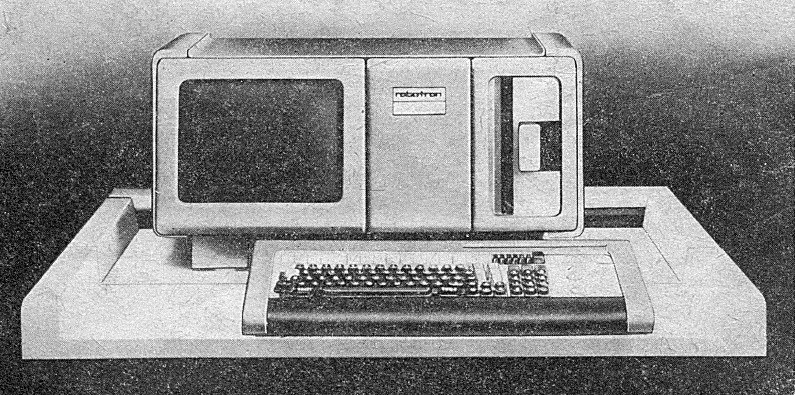
The A 5120 configured with a 8-inch floppy disk drive

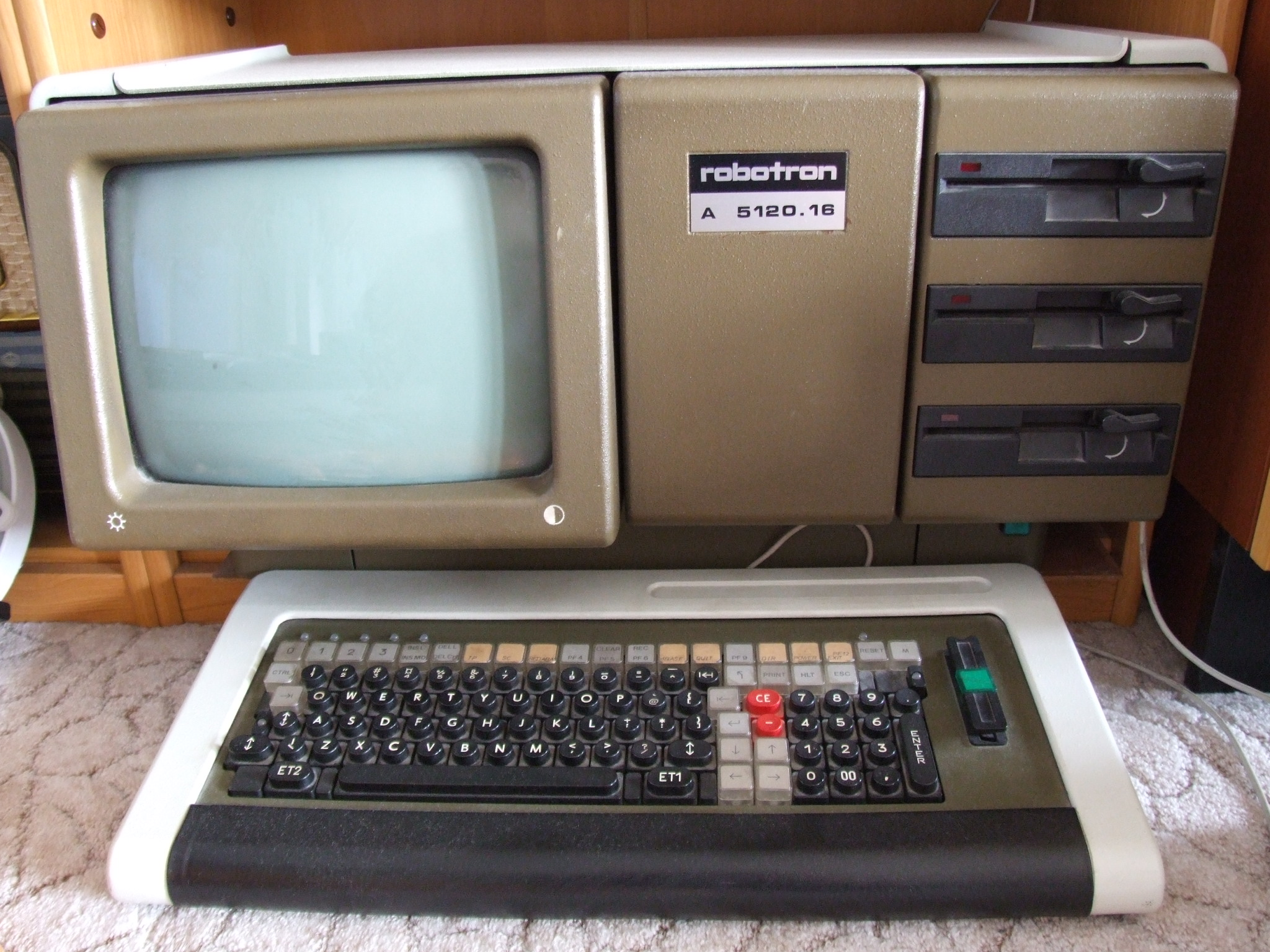
The upgraded 16-bit version, A 5120.16, introduced in 1986

== See also ==
- History of computer hardware in Eastern Bloc countries
- Robotron KC 87, a home computer with similar core hardware introduced in 1987
