= PC 1715 =

Office computer produced by VEB Robotron

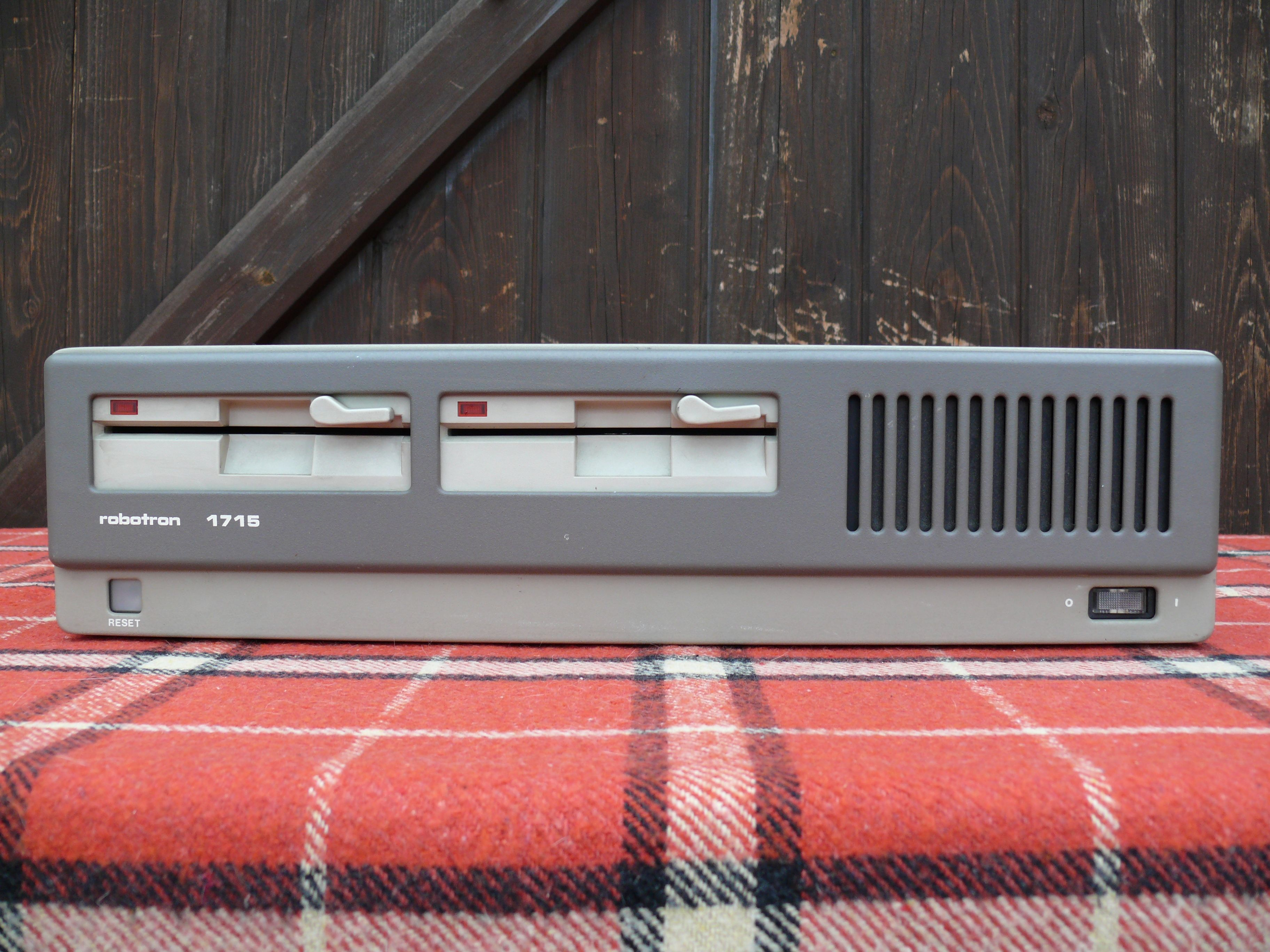
- Manufacturer: VEB Robotron
- Released: PC 1715: 1985; PC 1715W: 1987
- Introductory price: 19,000 marks
- Units shipped: 93,000
- Operating system: SCP (CP/M clone), UDOS (Z80-RIO clone)
- CPU: PC 1715: U880 (8-bit Z80 clone) at 2.5 MHz; PC 1715W: U880 at 4 MHz
- Memory: PC 1715: 64KB; PC 1715W: 256KB
- Storage: two 5.25" floppy drives
- Display: monochrome monitor
- Platform: K 1520 bus
- Dimensions: 50cm x 40cm x 14cm (housing)
- Weight: 12.8kg (housing, monitor, and keyboard)
- Predecessor: A 5120

The PC 1715 was an office computer produced by VEB Robotron in East Germany starting in 1985. The system featured an 8-bit microprocessor, the U880, a clone of the Zilog Z80. It was built for office work and education, but was also put to some specialist uses, for example an optional interface was available for controlling a pacemaker. The 1715 had minimal graphics and sound capabilities. The price was 19,000 East German marks.

In contrast to its predecessor, A5120, the PC1715 was not built around the K1520 bus standard. There was no back plane, but the mainboard had 2 58-pin connectors that were largely K1520-compliant, with some signals omitted and replaced with custom internal signals. The floppy controller of the PC1715 used one of those internal bus extensions and was built with discrete components and logic chips, whereas other Robotron computers of the 1980s used a clone of an Intel 8272 Floppy disk controller. The floppy controller board clearly appears to be based on the one used in the A5120.

The graphics subsystem on the other hand was part of the mainboard circuitry and relied on a Intel 8275 compatible CRT controller with a portion of main memory used as video memory.

A second U880 processor was used in the keyboard, together with a small firmware ROM to decode the keyboard matrix and transmit the keycode via a serial link to the mainboard. Though it was common practice at the time for processors that failed normal quality tests to be reused with much reduced clock frequencies and this may have been the case here.

In 1987, a new version was produced, the PC 1715W (1715M in the Soviet Union). The system was identical to the PC 1715, except the processor was clocked at 4 MHz and the machine had 256KB DRAM.

In total, about 93,000 PC 1715 and PC 1715W units were manufactured. An estimated 50,000 of those were exported to the Soviet Union.

In March 1987, a stamp was issued by the German Democratic Republic featuring the PC 1715. 8 million copies were printed.

== Images ==
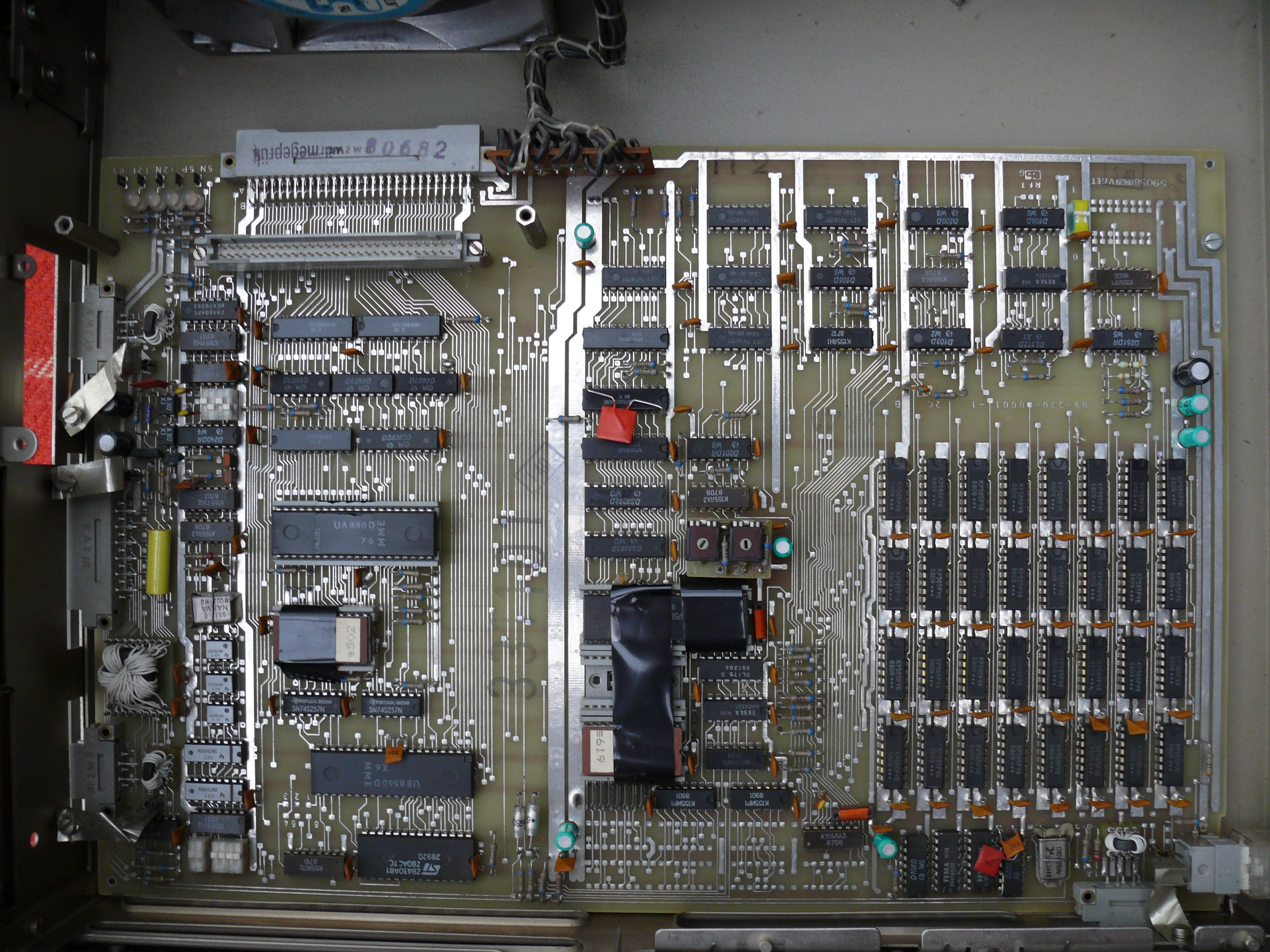
Mainboard of the PC 1715

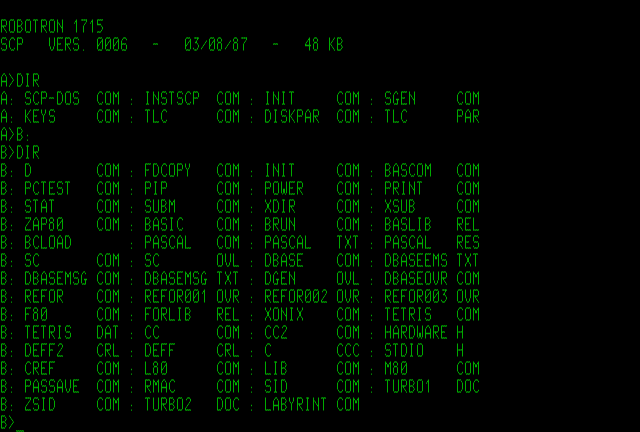
Screenshot of SCP (CP/M clone) running on the PC 1715

== See also ==
- History of computer hardware in Eastern Bloc countries
