= ESER =

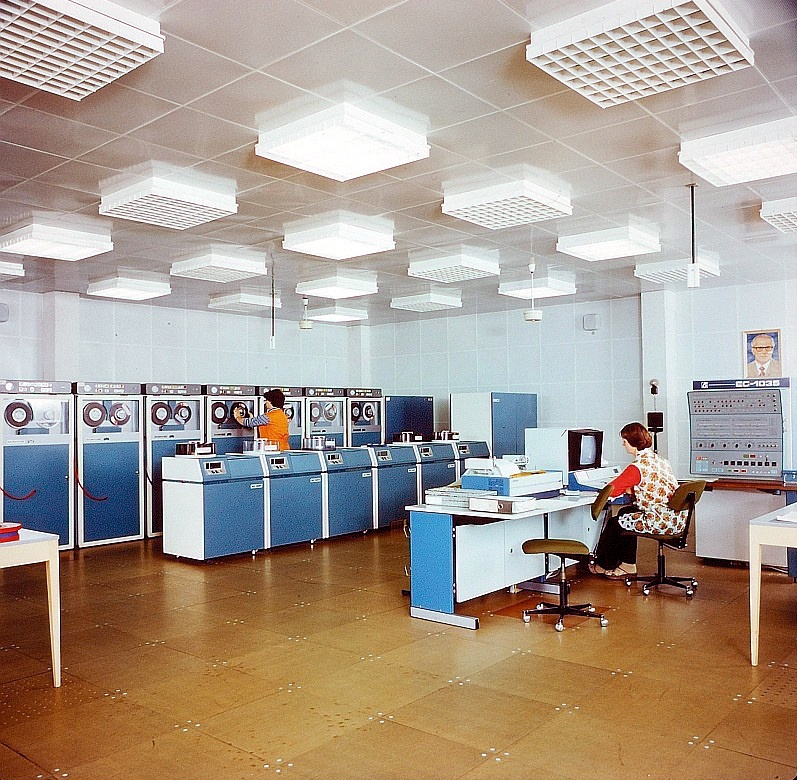
EC 1035

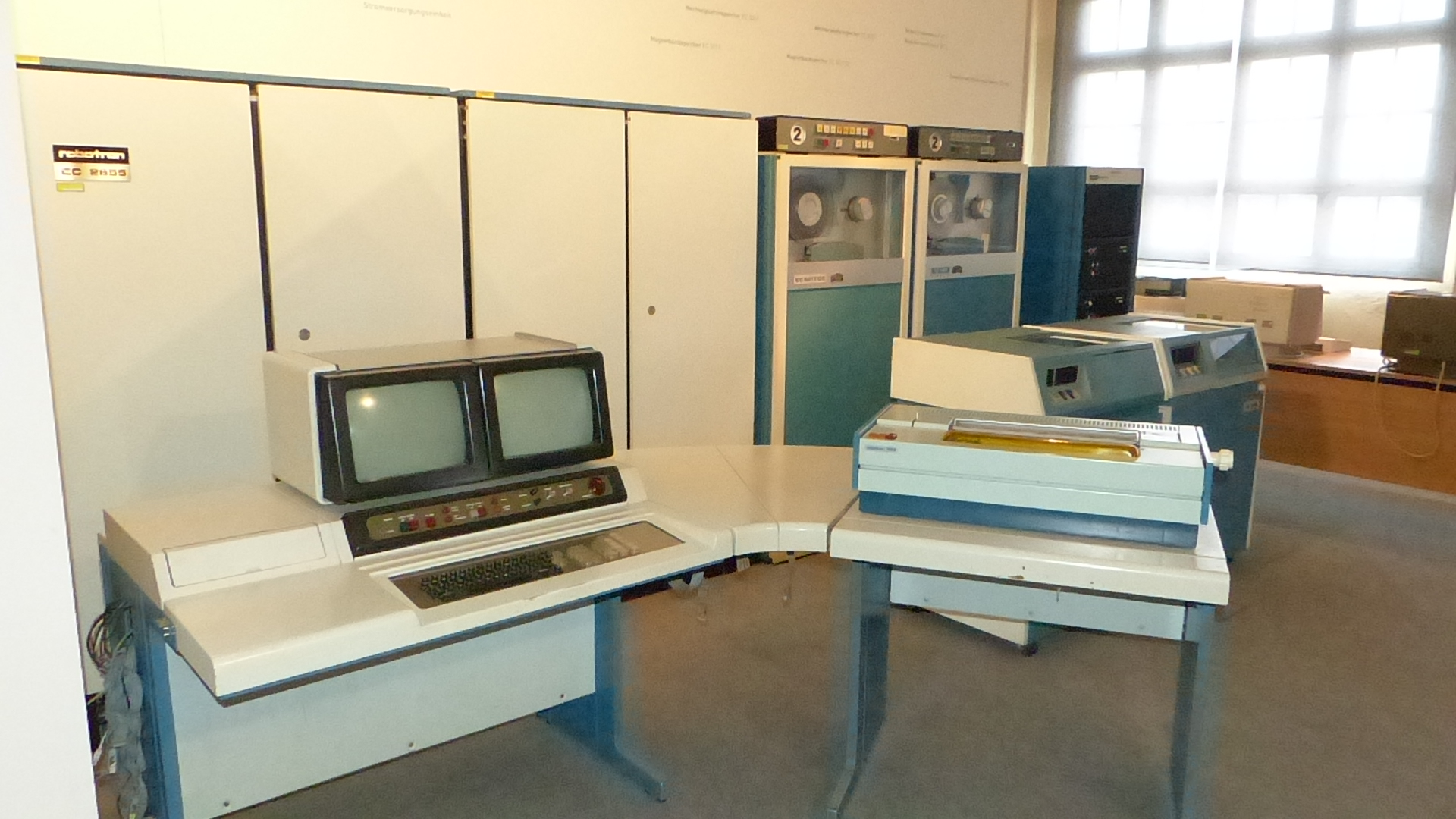
EC 1055

ESER is an abbreviation for Einheitliches System Elektronischer Rechenmaschinen (German for standardized system of electronic computers), a term used in the GDR for ES EVM computers produced according to a treaty between the members of Comecon signed on 23 December 1968 covering the development of a standardized computing system.

ESER was also the name for computers developed by this standard. Most ESER Computers were named ЕС (which is Cyrillic for "ES") followed by a four digit number, e.g., EC 1055, often also called ESER (e.g., ESER 1055). Robotron also produced minicomputers, whose names started with "K" (Kleinrechner for "minicomputer").

The ESER systems were in operation in GDR and later in the new states of Germany until 1995.

== GDR manufacturing ==
- Robotron

- EC 1834, 1835 (IBM PC XT compatibles)
- EC 1040, 1055, 1055M, 1056, 1057
- EC 7927
- K 1001, 1002, 1003, K 1510, K 1520, K 1820, K 5103, K 5201, K 8913, K 8915, K 8924
- CM 1910

== Gallery ==
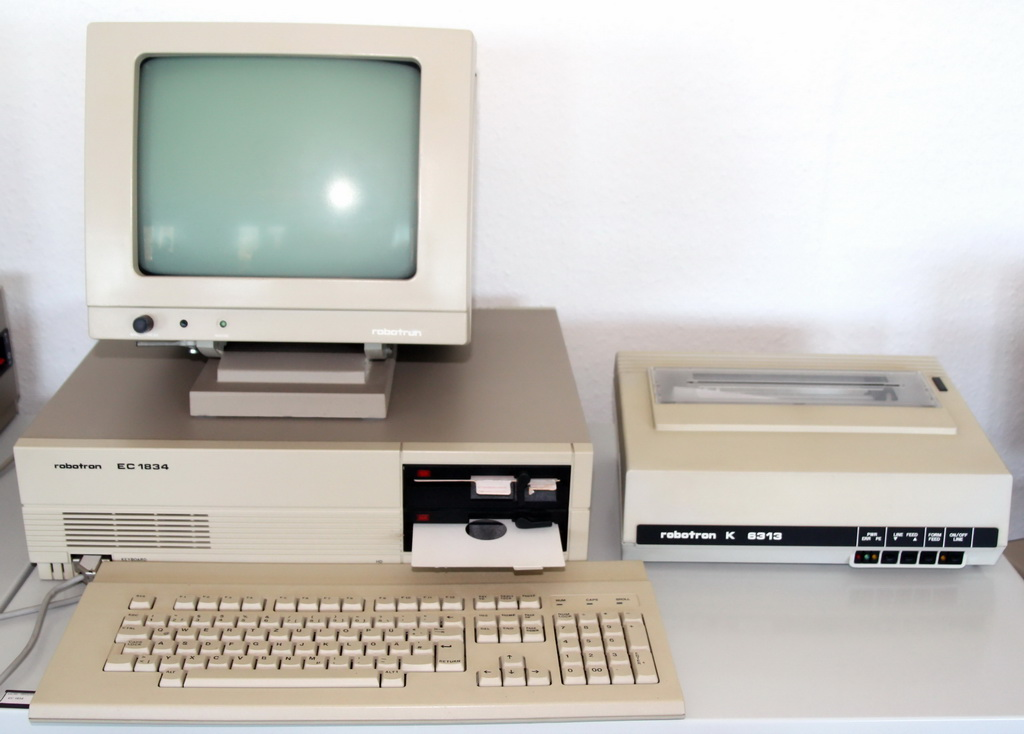
EC 1834 with monitor K 7229.25 and printer K 6313

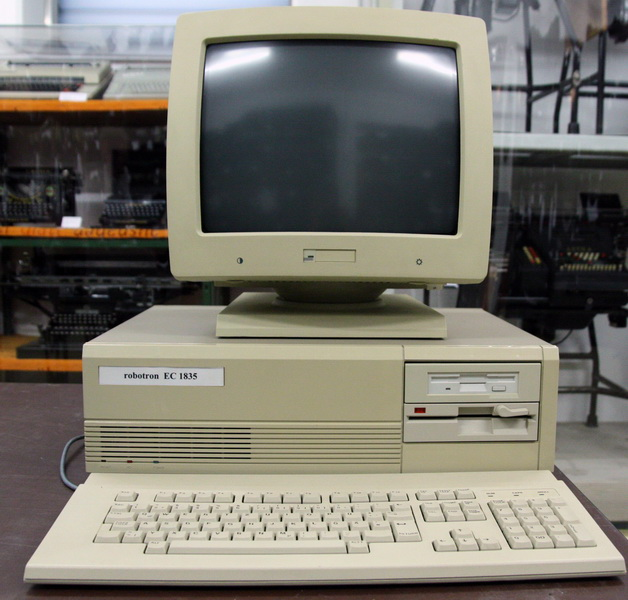
EC 1835 prototype with monitor K 7233
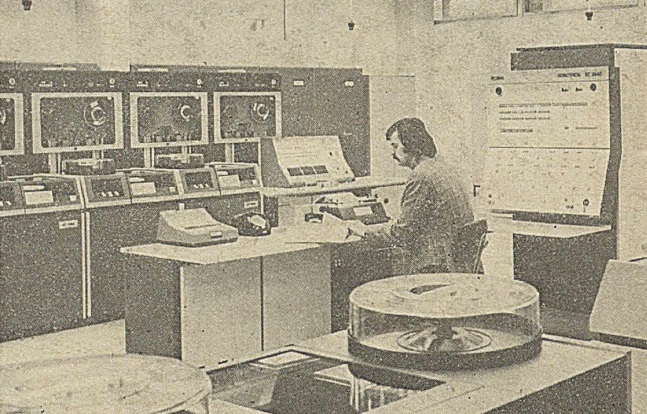
EC 1040

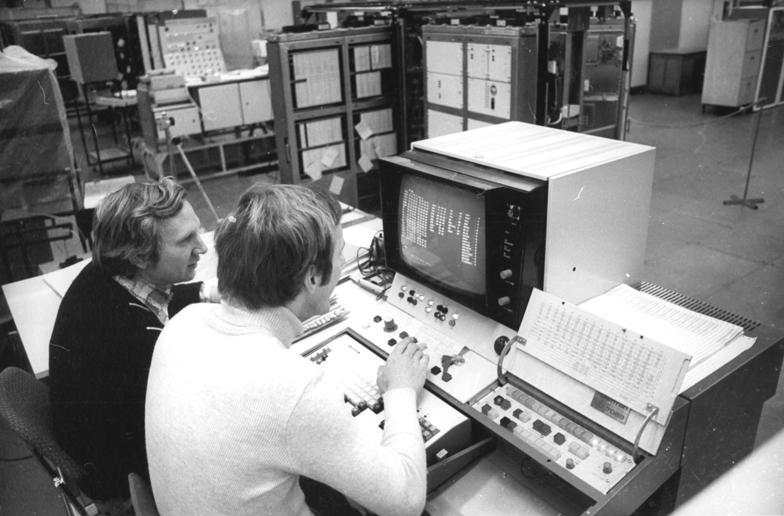
EC 1055
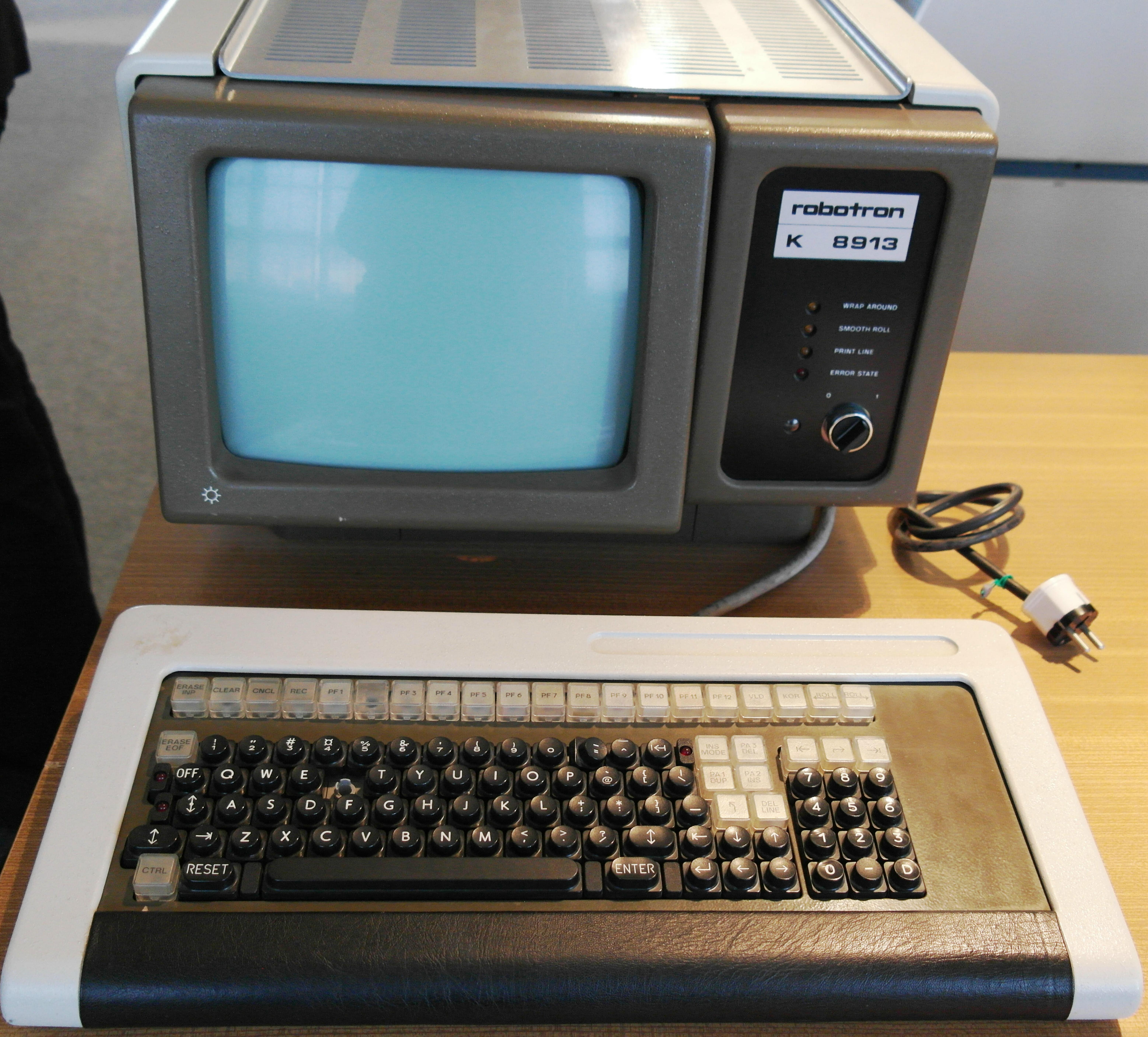
K 8913

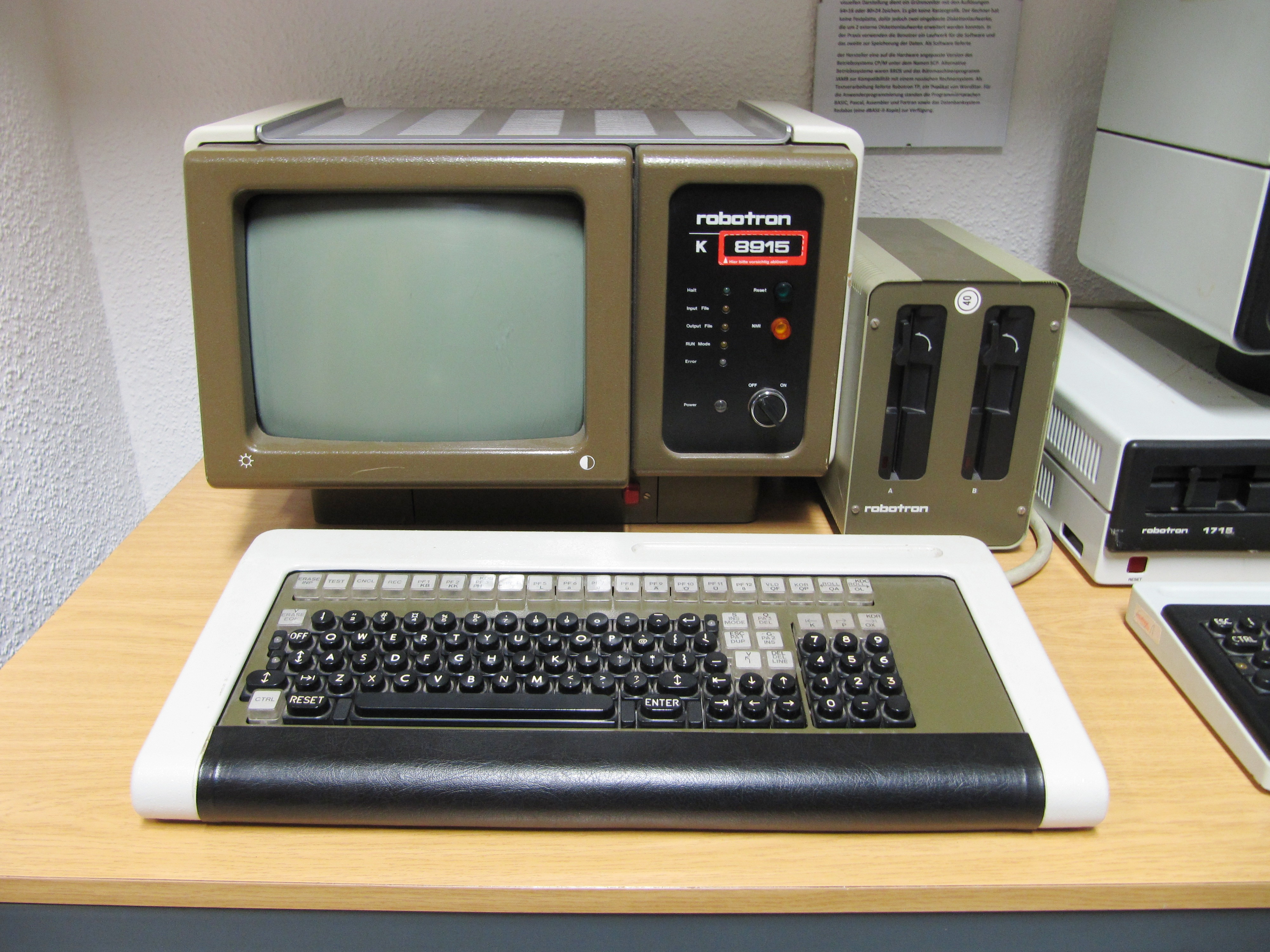
K 8915

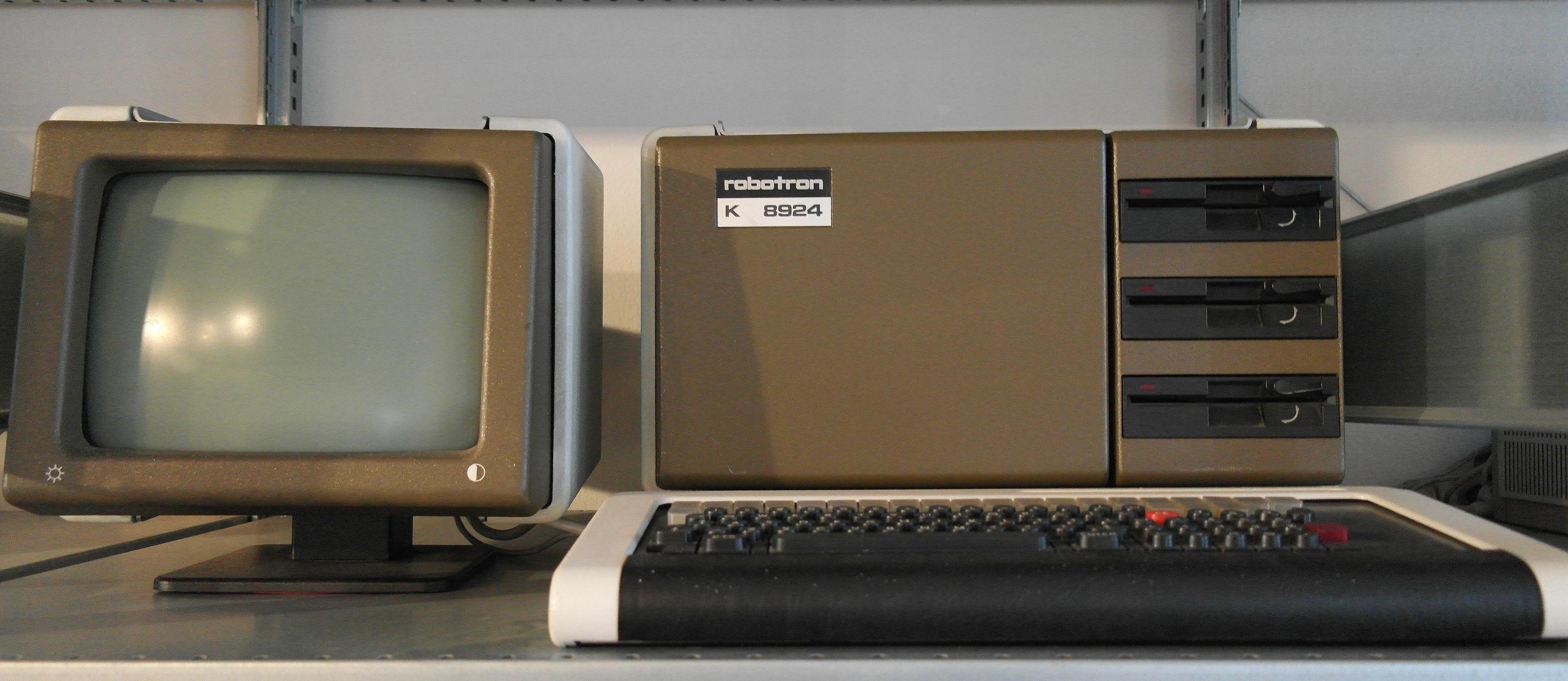
K 8924
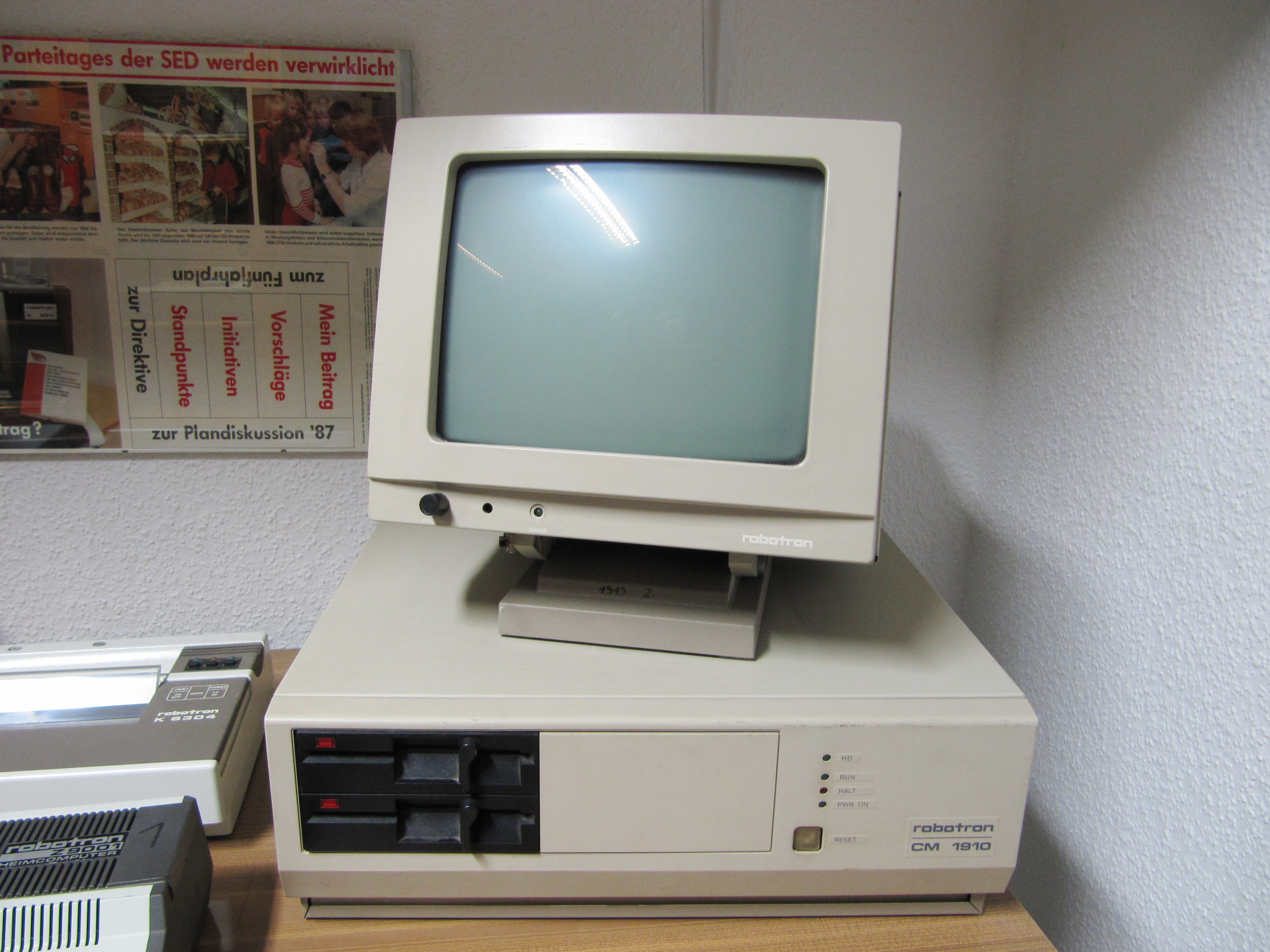
CM 1910

== Hungarian manufacturing ==
- Videoton

- EC 1010, 1011, 1012

== See also ==
- History of computer hardware in Eastern Bloc countries
