= Robotron KC 87 =

Microcomputers made in East Germany from 1984 until 1990

Kleincomputer robotron KC 87

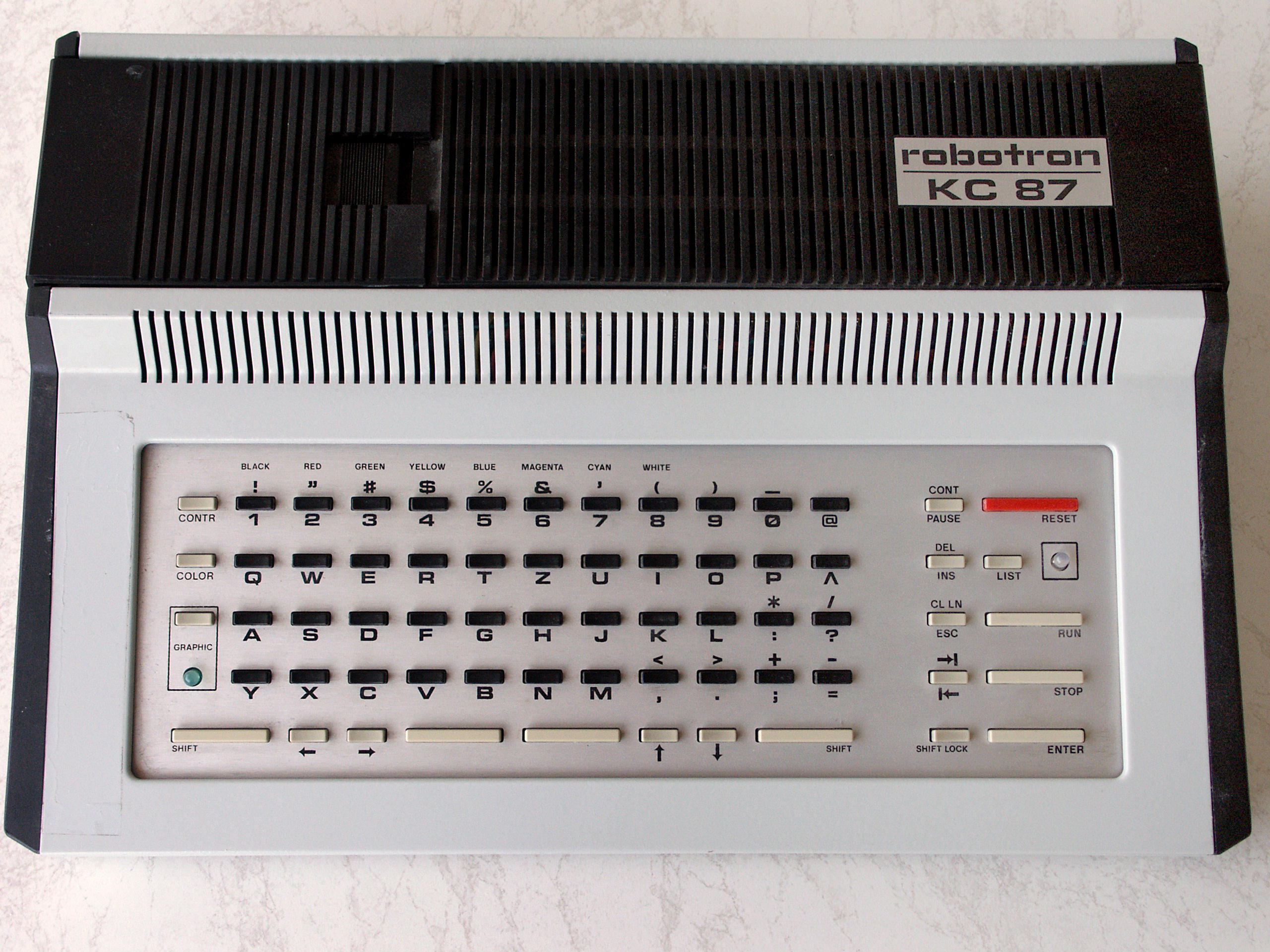
- Developer: VEB Robotron-Meßelektronik "Otto Schön" Dresden
- Type: Microcomputer
- Released: Z 9001: 1984; KC 85/1: 1985; KC 87: 1987
- Lifespan: 5 years
- Introductory price: Z 9001.10: 1550 M KC 85/1.10: 1550 M KC 85/1.11: 1940 M KC 87.10: 3005 M KC 87.11: 3390 M
- Discontinued: Z 9001: 1985; KC 85/1: 1987; KC 87: March 1989
- Units sold: ~30.000
- Media: Cassette tape, expansion modules
- Operating system: Z9001-OS [de] (4 KB), character ROM (2 KB), KC 87: KC-BASIC [de] interpreter in ROM
- CPU: U880 (Zilog Z80 clone) @ 2.5 MHz
- Memory: 17 KB (64 KB max.) (DRAM)
- Display: 40x20 or 40x24 characters (semigraphics); X.X0: monochrome X.X1: color with expansion: 256×192 pixels monochrome
- Sound: Buzzer
- Power: 220 V, 50 Hz, 25 W
- Platform: K 1520 bus
- Dimensions: 40 cm × 30 cm × 8.5 cm (15,7 in x 11.8 in x 3.1 in)
- Weight: ~4 kg
- Successor: BIC A 5105 [de]

The Robotron KC 87, fully known as Kleincomputer robotron KC 87 (KC standing for Kleincomputer, lit. "small computer"), was an 8-bit microcomputer released in 1987 and produced in East Germany by VEB Robotron-Meßelektronik "Otto Schön" Dresden, part of Kombinat Robotron.

The first model in the series, the Robotron Z 9001, originally designed as a home computer and introduced in 1984, was renamed to Robotron KC 85/1 in 1985 to de-emphasize its use as consumer good. Despite similar names, the Robotron Kleincomputers were not directly related to the KC 85 mass-produced by VEB Mikroelektronik "Wilhelm Pieck" Mühlhausen.

The availability of the Robotron KC series for private customers was very limited. The computers were mostly used at educational institutions, organizations, and enterprises. Therefore, the extracurricular use of KC computers was often allowed for students at institutions and organizations.

== Technical information ==
The Robotron KC series used an U880 microprocessor, a clone of the Zilog Z80, clocked at 2.5 MHz. Every machine came with a built-in keyboard, power supply and RF modulator. Software could be loaded from cassette tapes, which required a separate cassette deck. All models featured K 1520 bus slots for up to four expansion modules. They allowed expanding the hardware, such as upgrading the RAM, connecting a printer or displaying bitmapped graphics, but also included modules with application software and programming languages. The KC 87 had a KC-BASIC [de] interpreter in ROM. In earlier models, the user had to load BASIC from tape or use an expansion module. Sufficiently expanded models could even run SCP [de], an East German CP/M clone. Robotron also offered cassette tapes with applications and games.

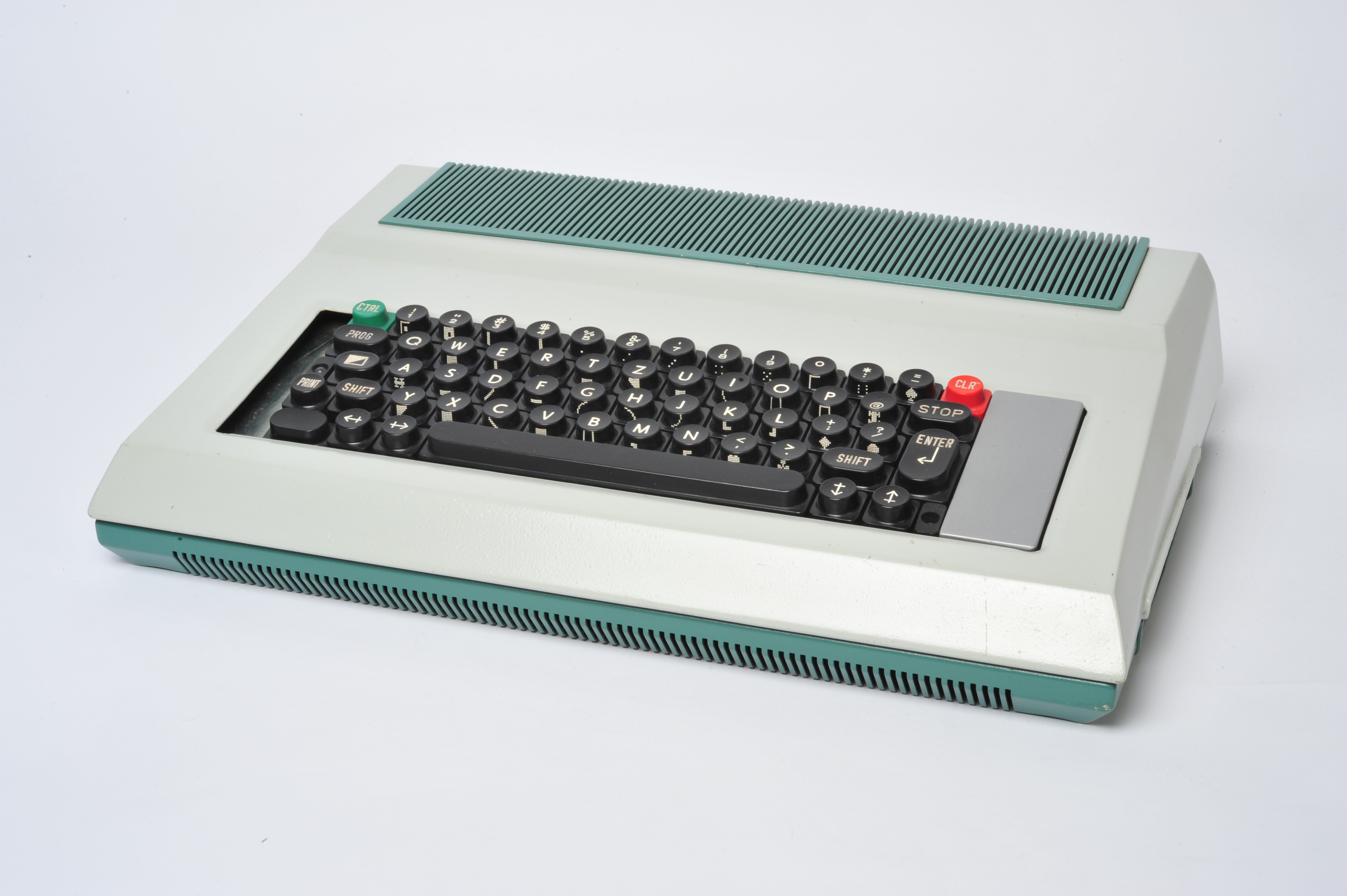
Robotron Z 9001 prototype

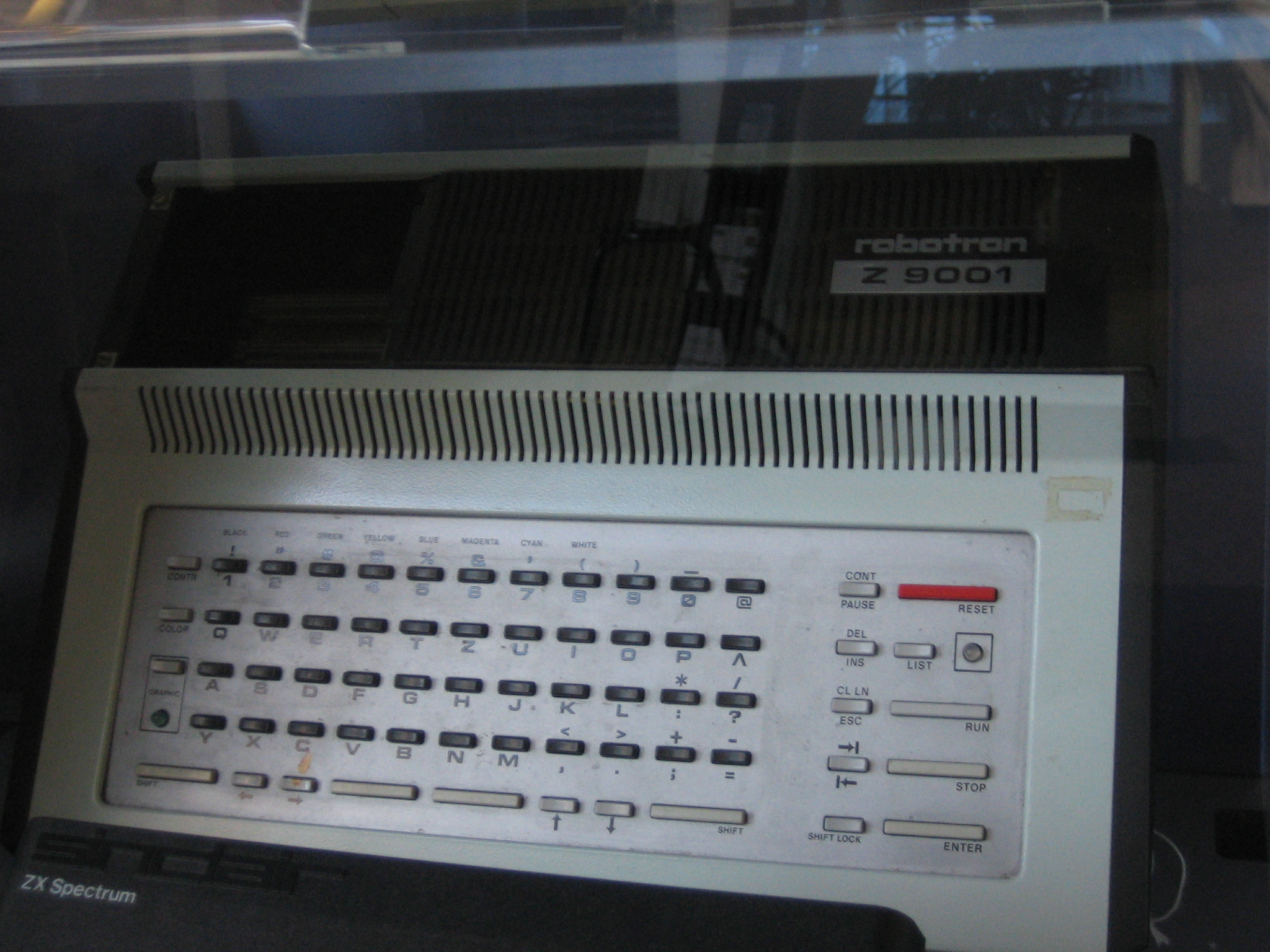
Robotron Z 9001

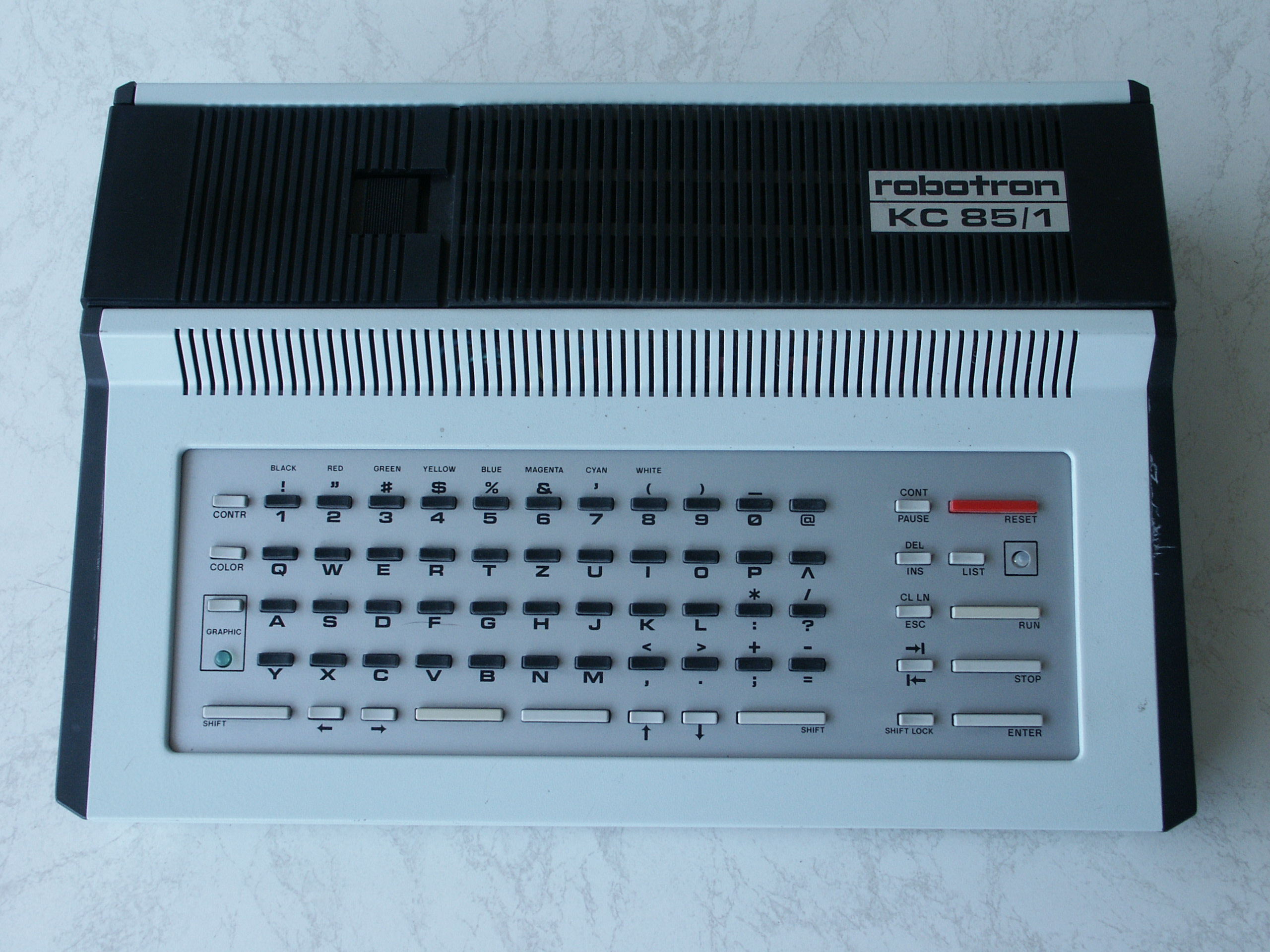
Robotron KC 85/1

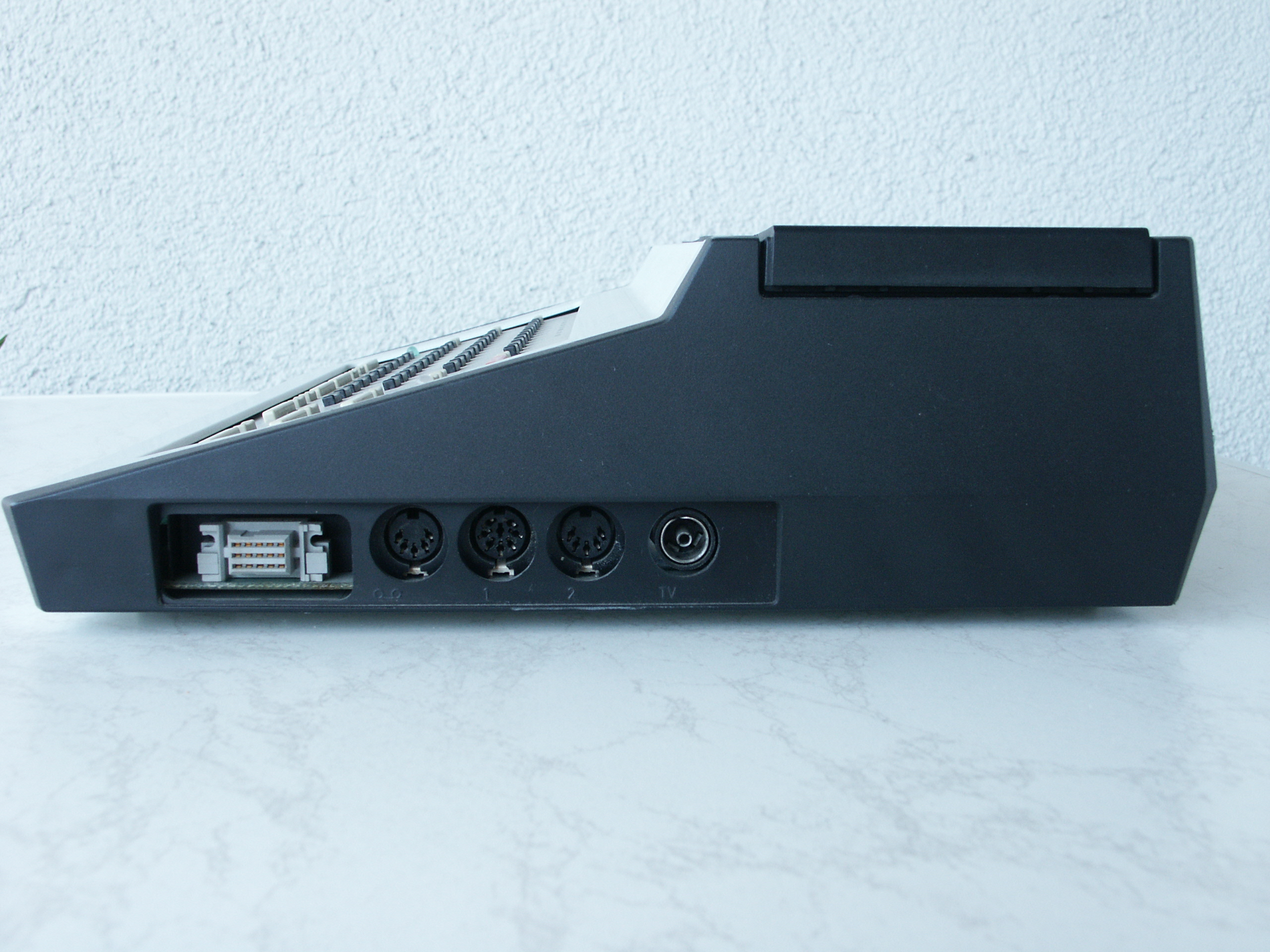
Robotron KC 87, side view

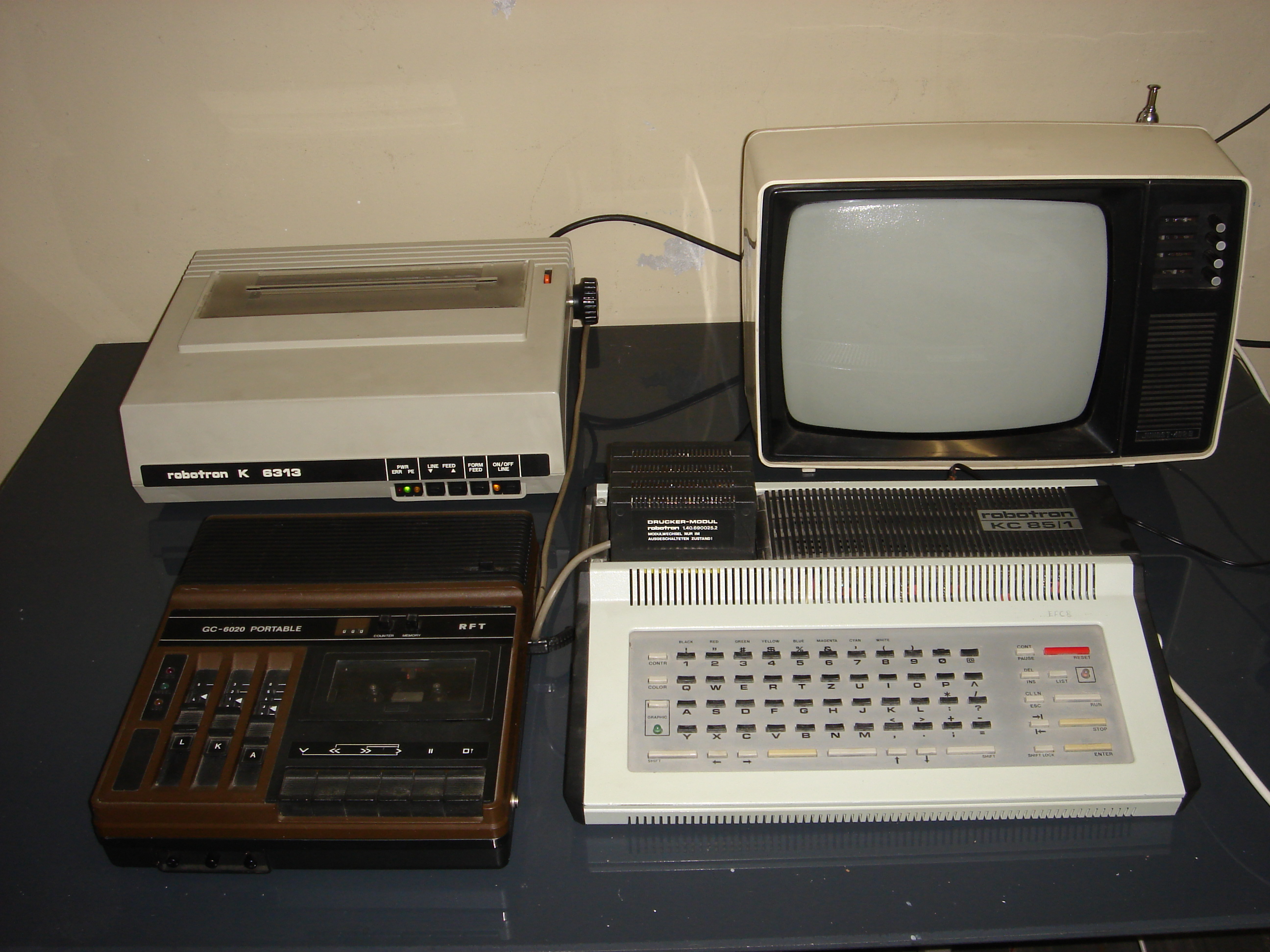
Workplace with Robotron KC 85/1: cassette deck Geracord 6020 Portable, dot matrix printer Robotron K 6313 and Russian Junost-402B television set.

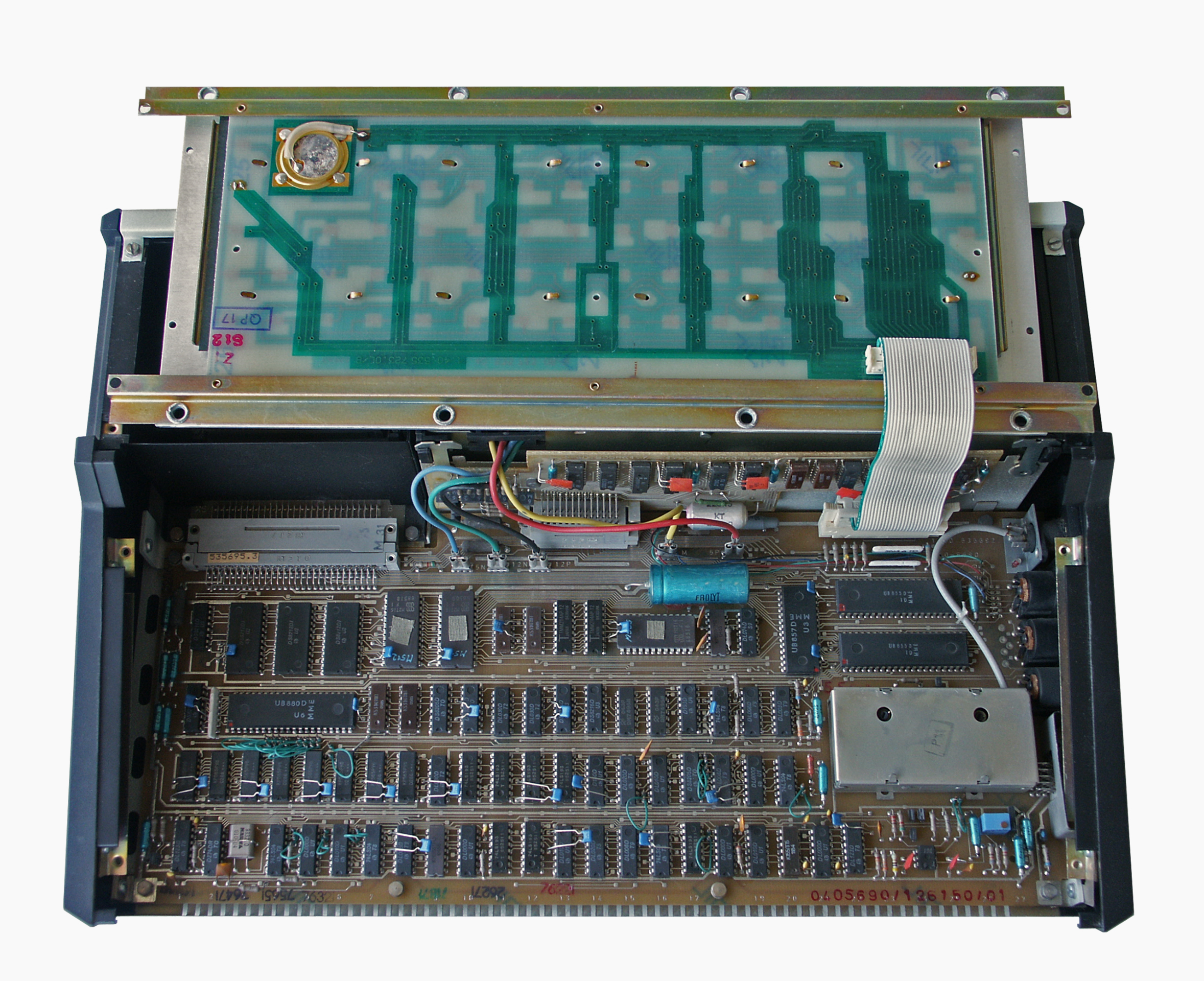
Internals of the KC 85/1, keyboard folded up

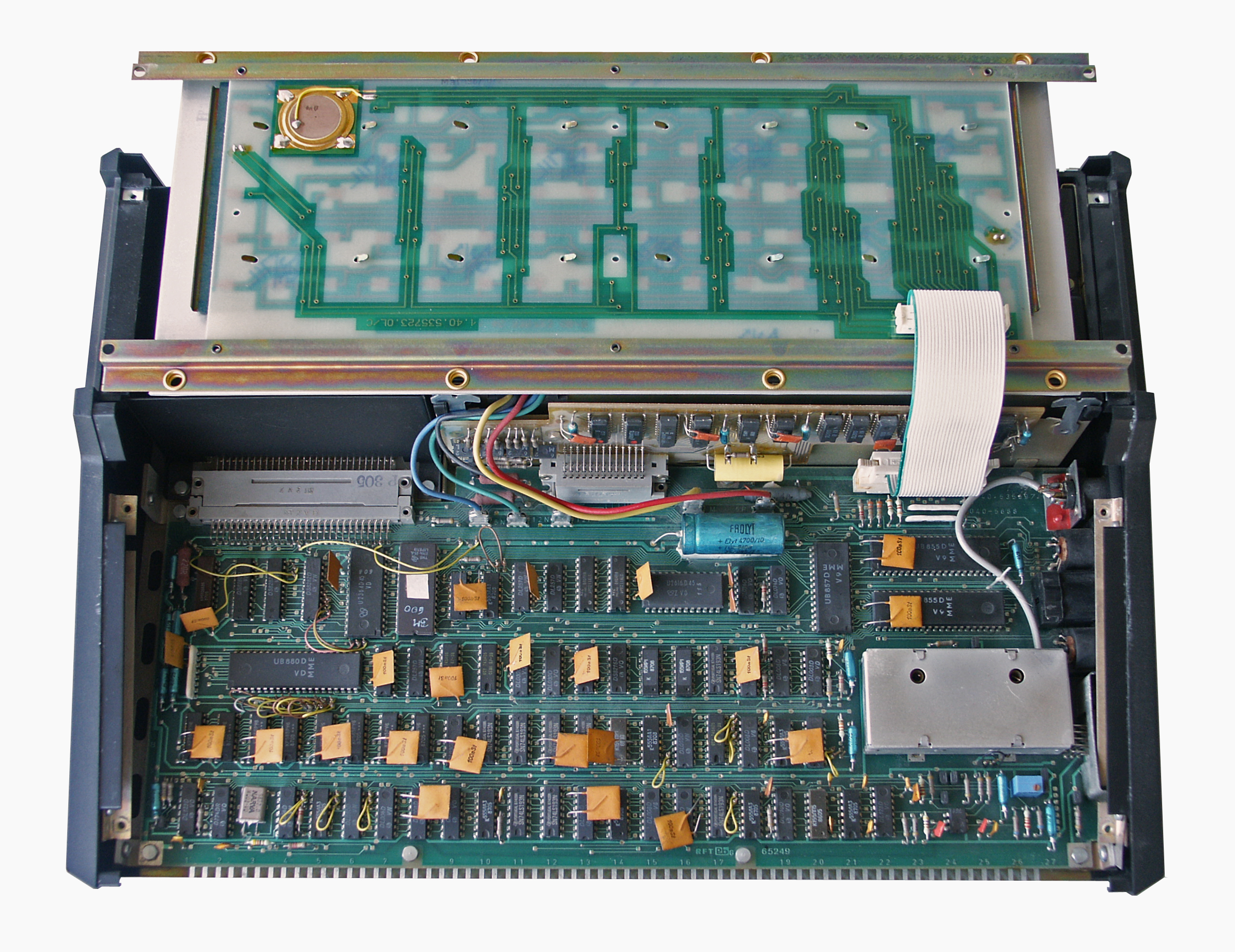
KC 87 with revised mainboard

== Trivia ==
Thomas Dohmke, who became CEO of GitHub in 2021, started coding on a Robotron KC 87.

== See also ==
- Robotron Z 1013 – A mostly compatible hobbyist kit, available even to private consumers via written order, waiting of one year and then self-pickup from factory outlet.
- RFT KC 85 – A series of mostly compatible microcomputers made by VEB Mikroelektronik.
- RFT KC compact – The only pre-assembled home computer made in the GDR aimed at private consumers; not compatible to any of the other KC systems.
