= List of ZX80 and ZX81 clones =

The following is a list of clones of Sinclair Research's ZX80 and ZX81 home computers:

== ZX80 ==
- MicroAce (1980, US)
- Microdigital TK80 (1981, Brazil)
- Microdigital TK82 (1981, Brazil)
- Nova Electrônica/Prológica NE-Z80 (1981, Brazil)
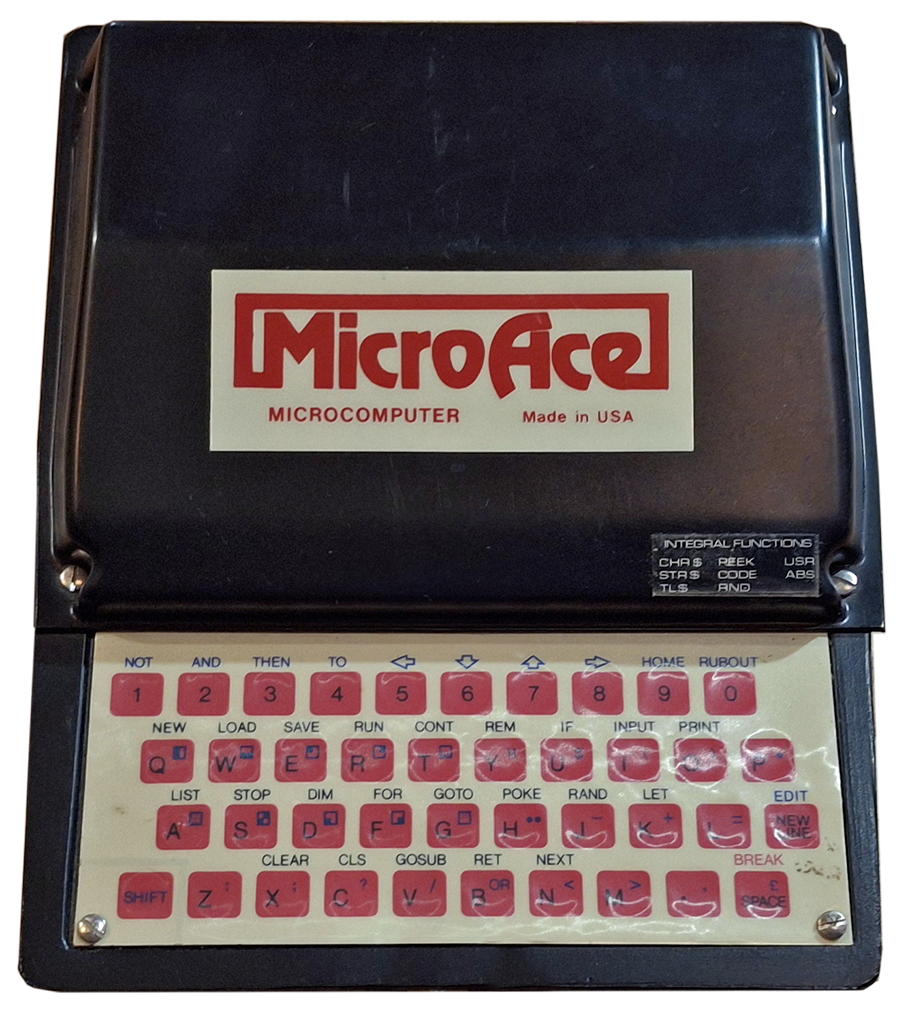
MicroAce

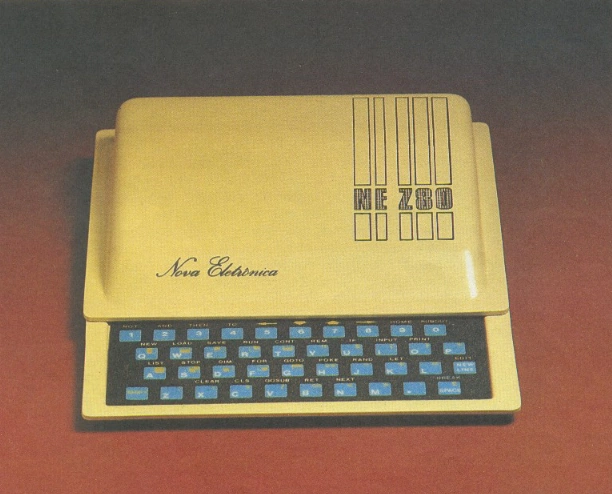
NE-Z80

== ZX81 ==
=== Official clones ===
- Timex Sinclair T/S 1000 (a ZX81 with the same circuit board from the same factory, but with a 2K x 8 RAM chip instead of 1K and small keyboard mask/character set changes. This is typically a U.S. model, with a VHF NTSC RF modulator and slightly improved RF shielding, but are the same BASIC machine)
- Timex Sinclair T/S 1500 (a TS1000 in a ZX Spectrum like case with 16k built-in)
- Lambda Electronics Lambda 8300 (a 1983 clone, also branded as PC 8300, DEF 3000, Basic 2000, Marathon 32K, Tonel PC, Unisonic Futura 8300, PC-81 Personal Computer, CAC-3, Polybrain P118, Creon Electronics Power 3000 or NF300 jiaoXueDianNao)
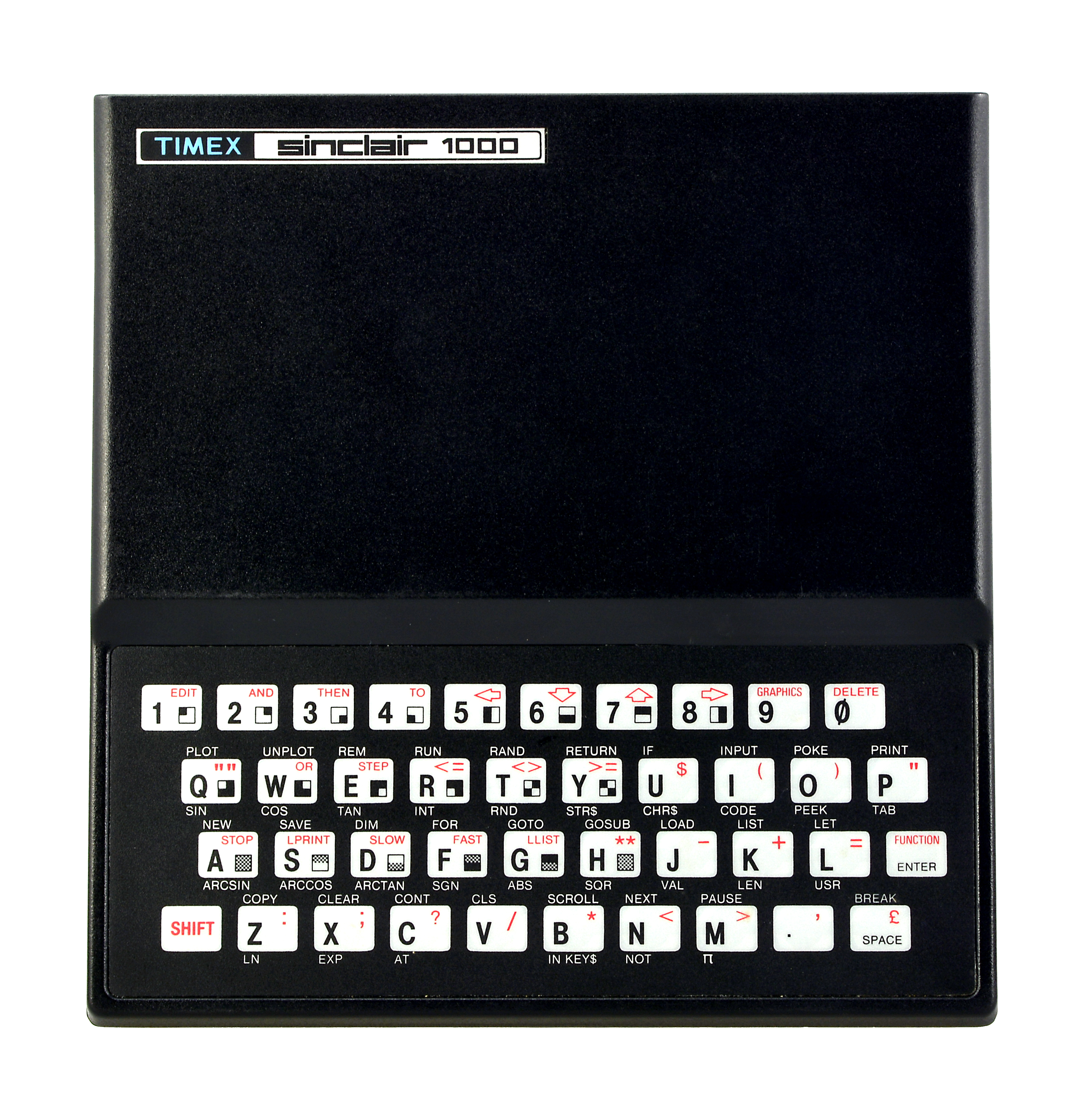
T/S 1000

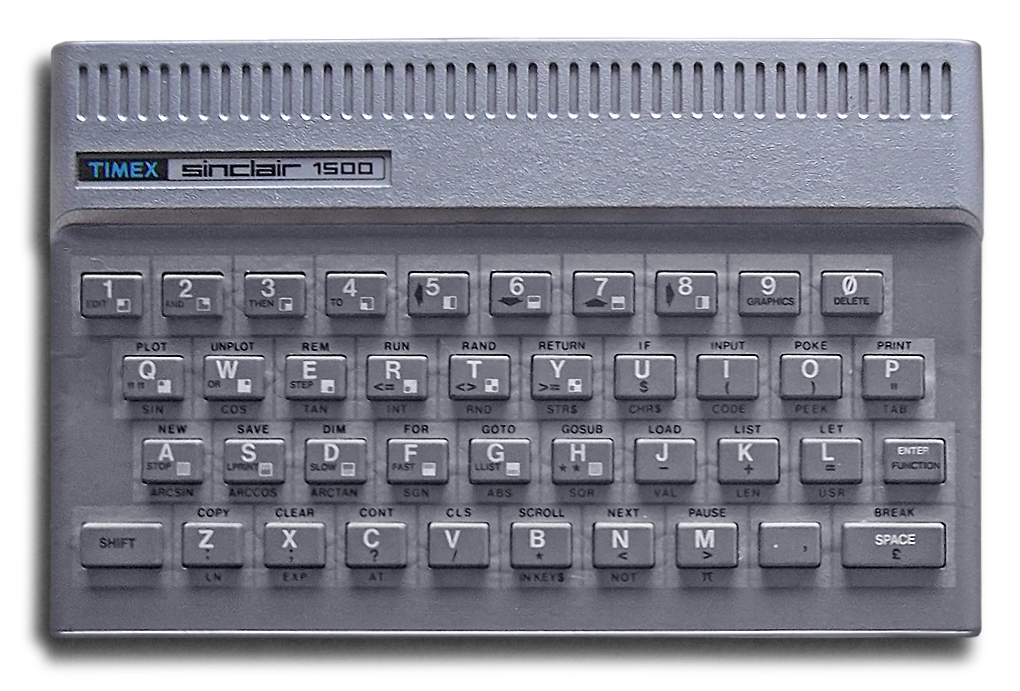
T/S 1500

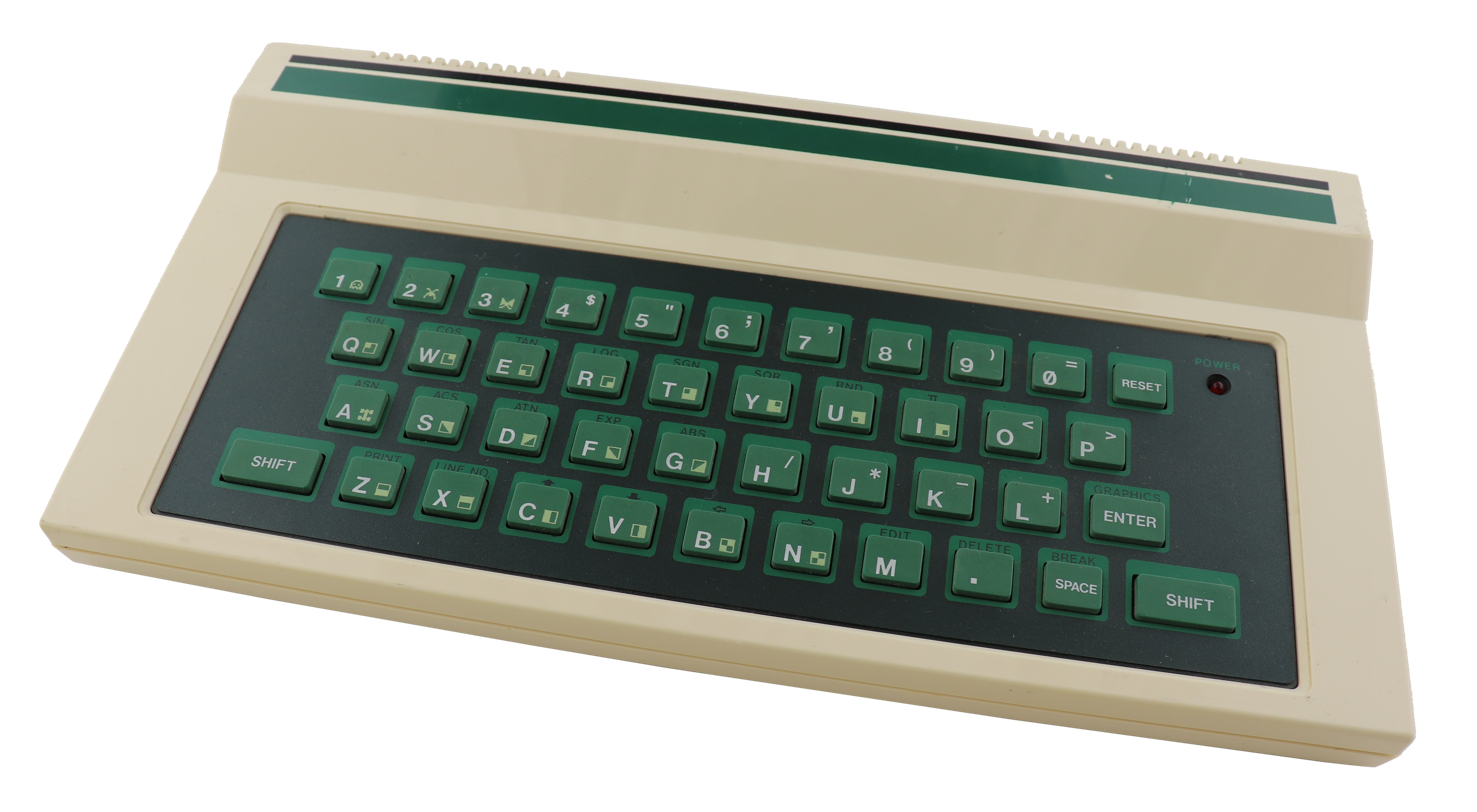
Lambda 8300

=== Brazilian clones ===
- Microdigital TK82C (smaller case and 2K RAM, 1981)
- Microdigital TK83 (same case as original, but golden instead of black, 1982)
- Microdigital TK85 (ZX Spectrum case and 16K or 48K RAM, 1983)
- Prológica CP-200 (inverted video and larger case, 1982)
- Prologica CP200S
- cdSE Microcomputadores Apply 300
- Ritas do Brasil Ringo R470 (1983)
- Nova Electrônica/Prológica NE-Z8000 (1982)
- Engebrás AS-1000 (1984)
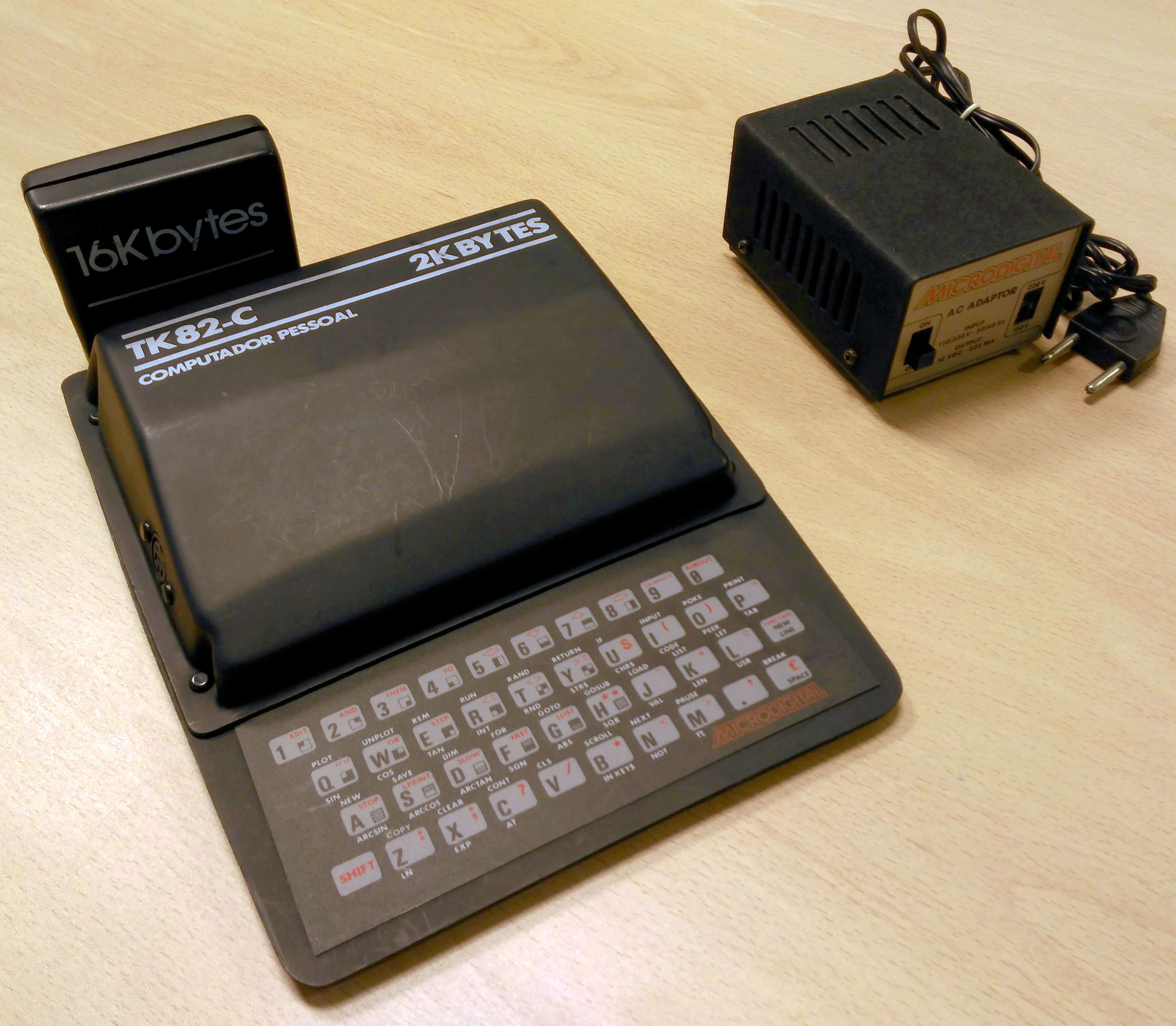
TK82C

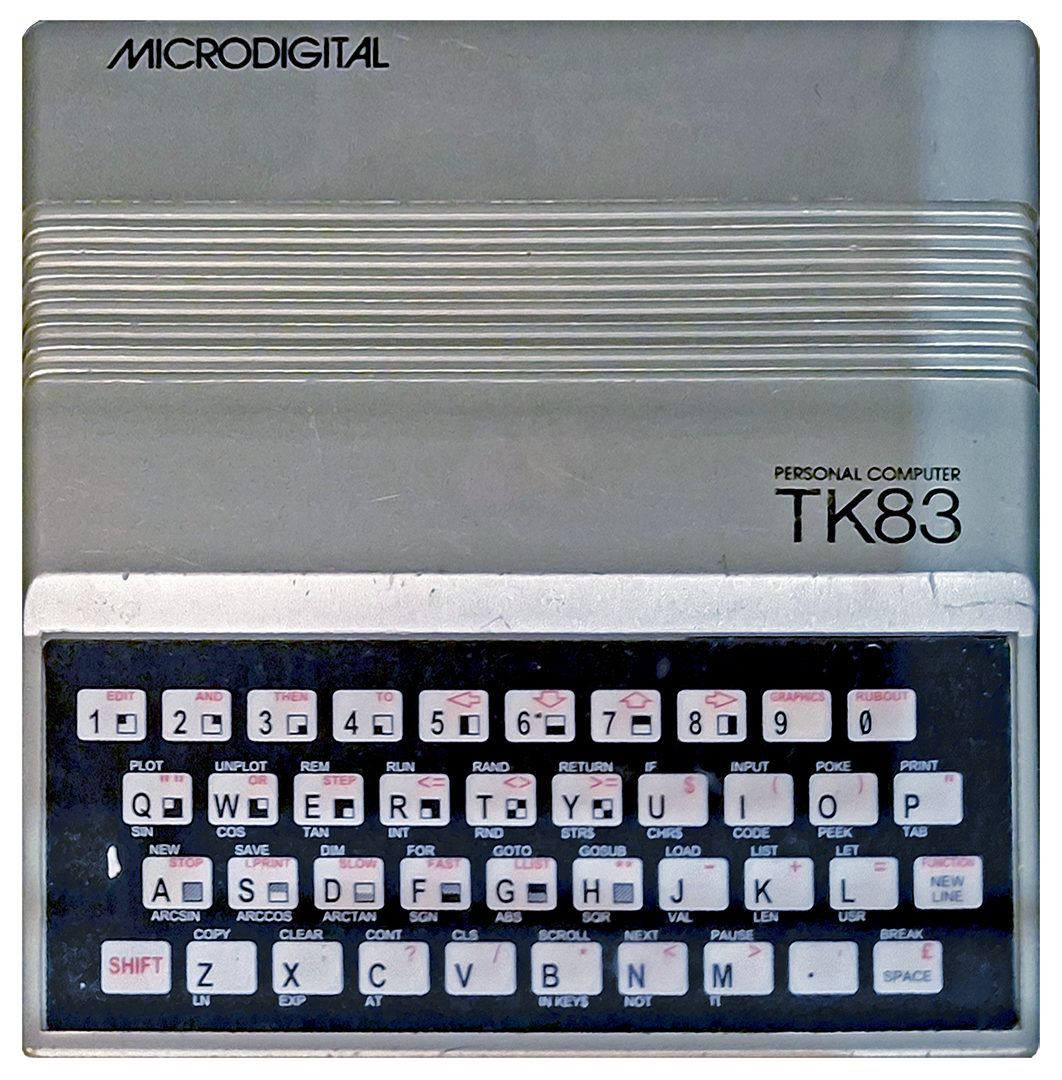
TK83

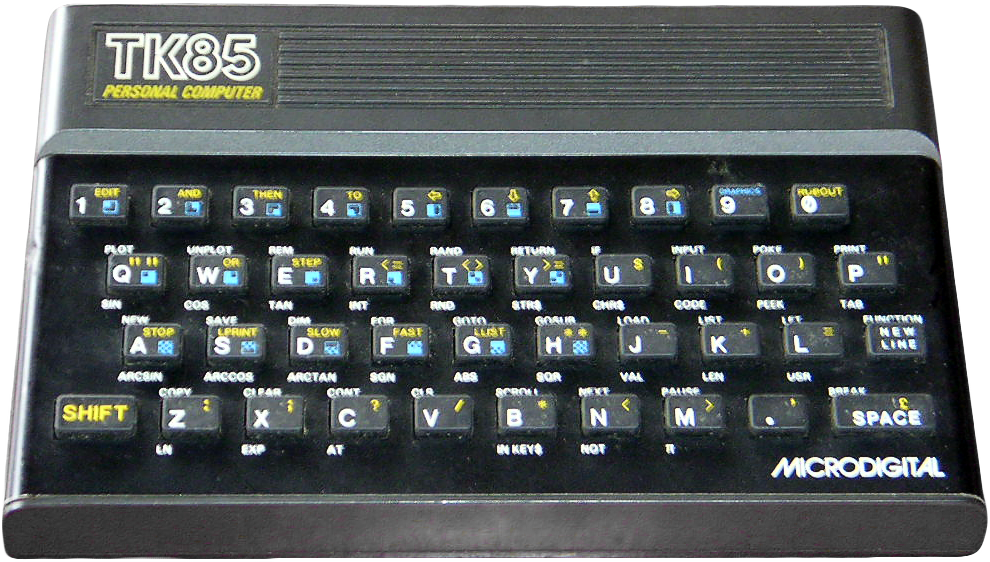
TK85

CP 200

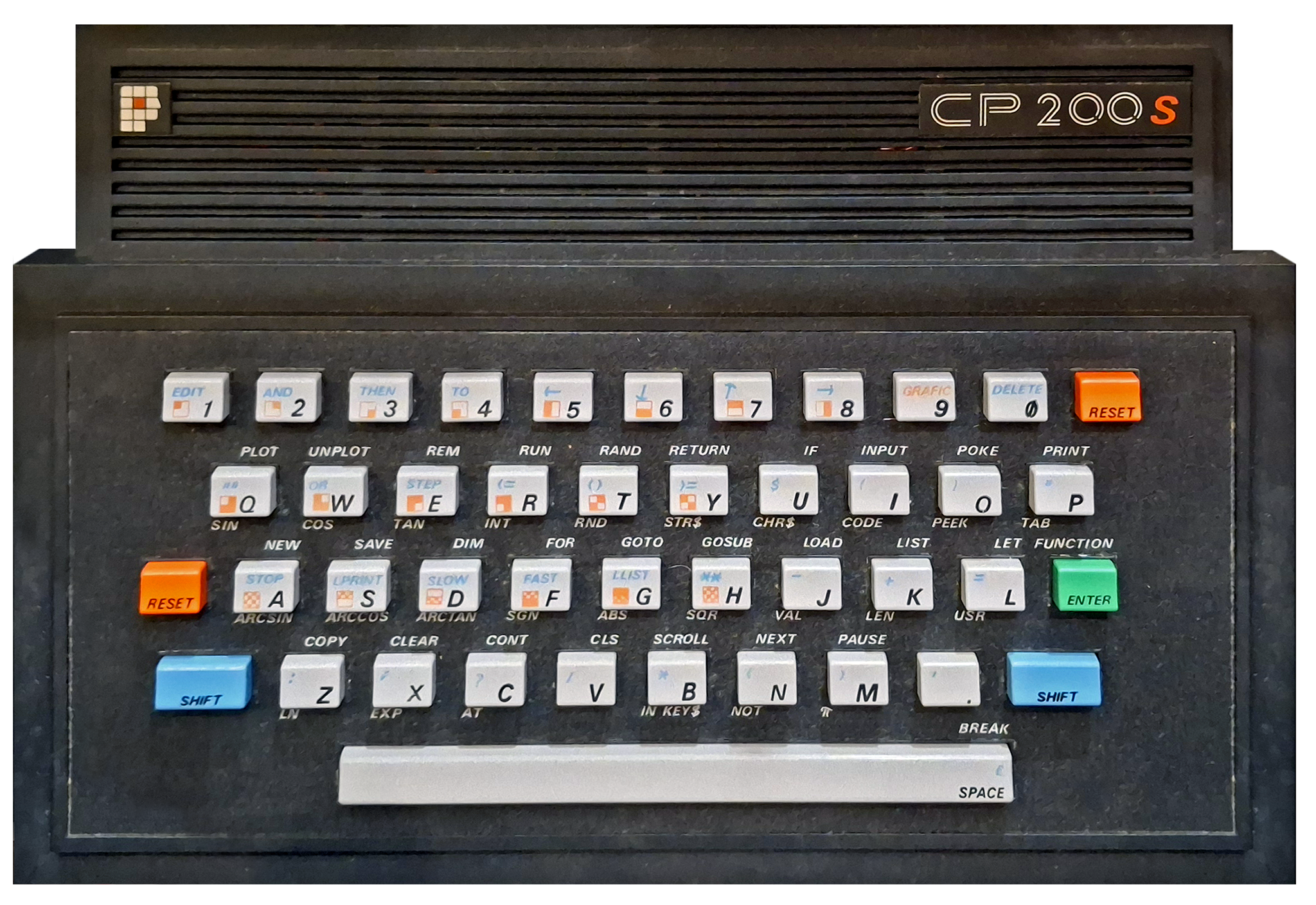
CP 200S

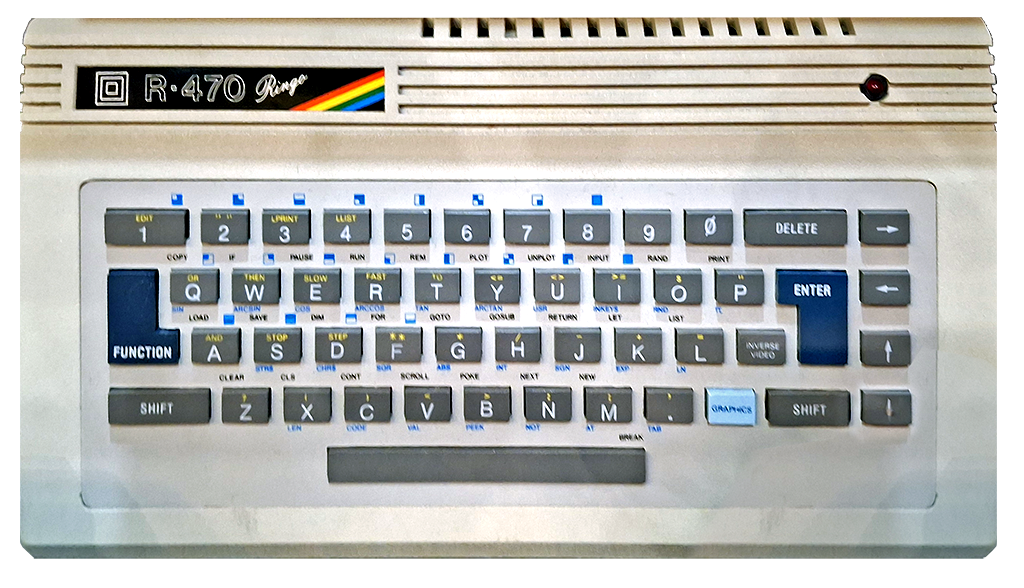
Ringo R-470

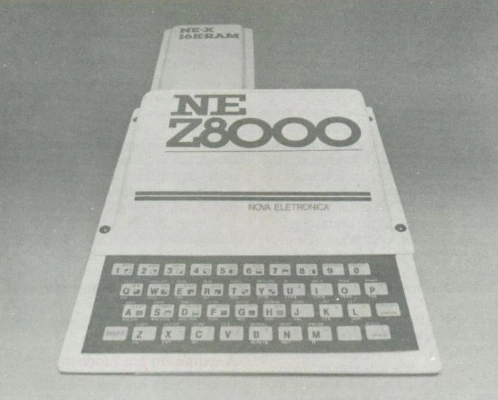
NE-Z8000

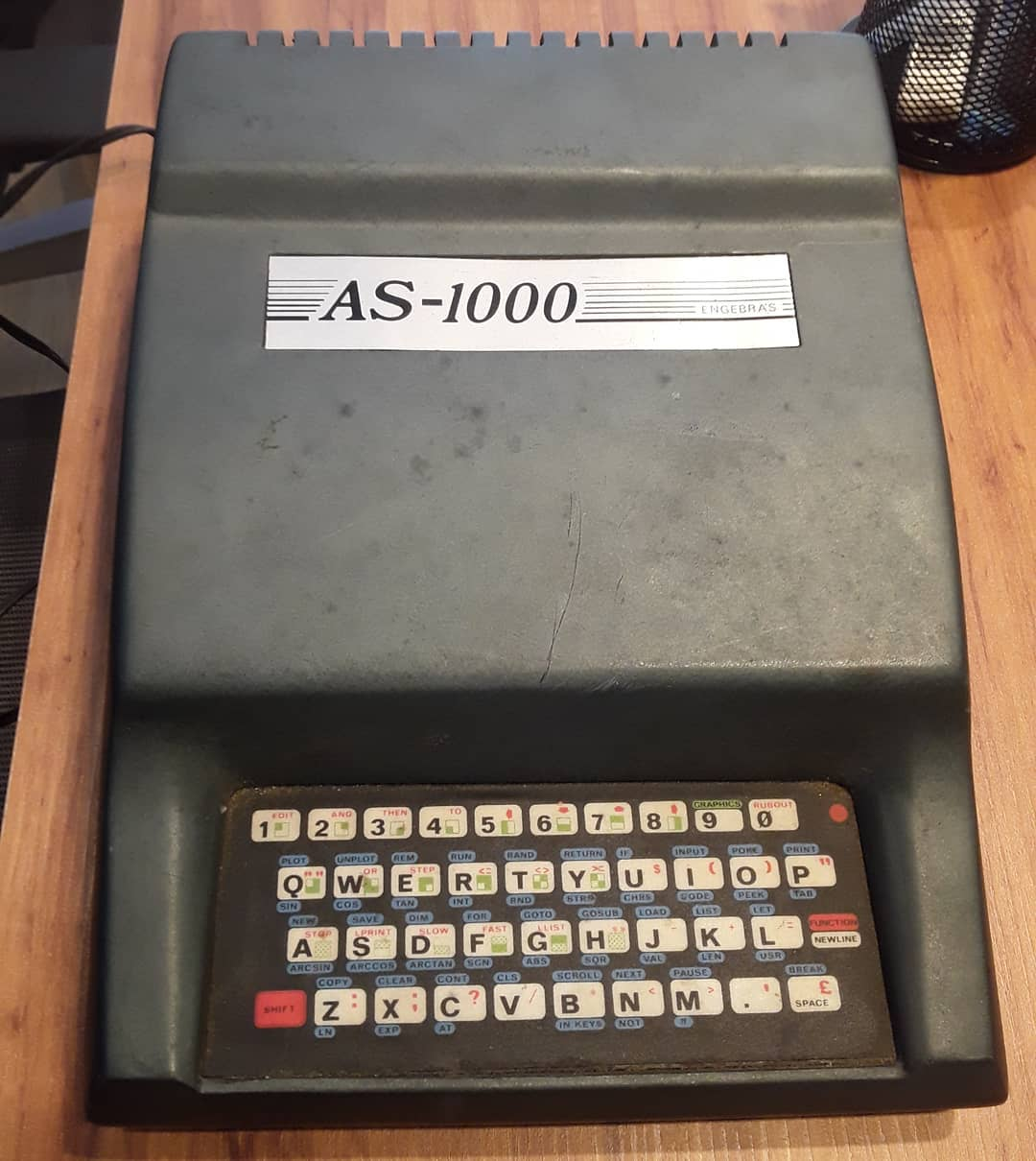
AS-1000

=== Argentinean clones ===
- Czerweny CZ 1000 (1985)
- Czerweny CZ 1500 (1985)
- Czerweny CZ 1000 plus (1986)
- Czerweny CZ 1500 plus (1986)
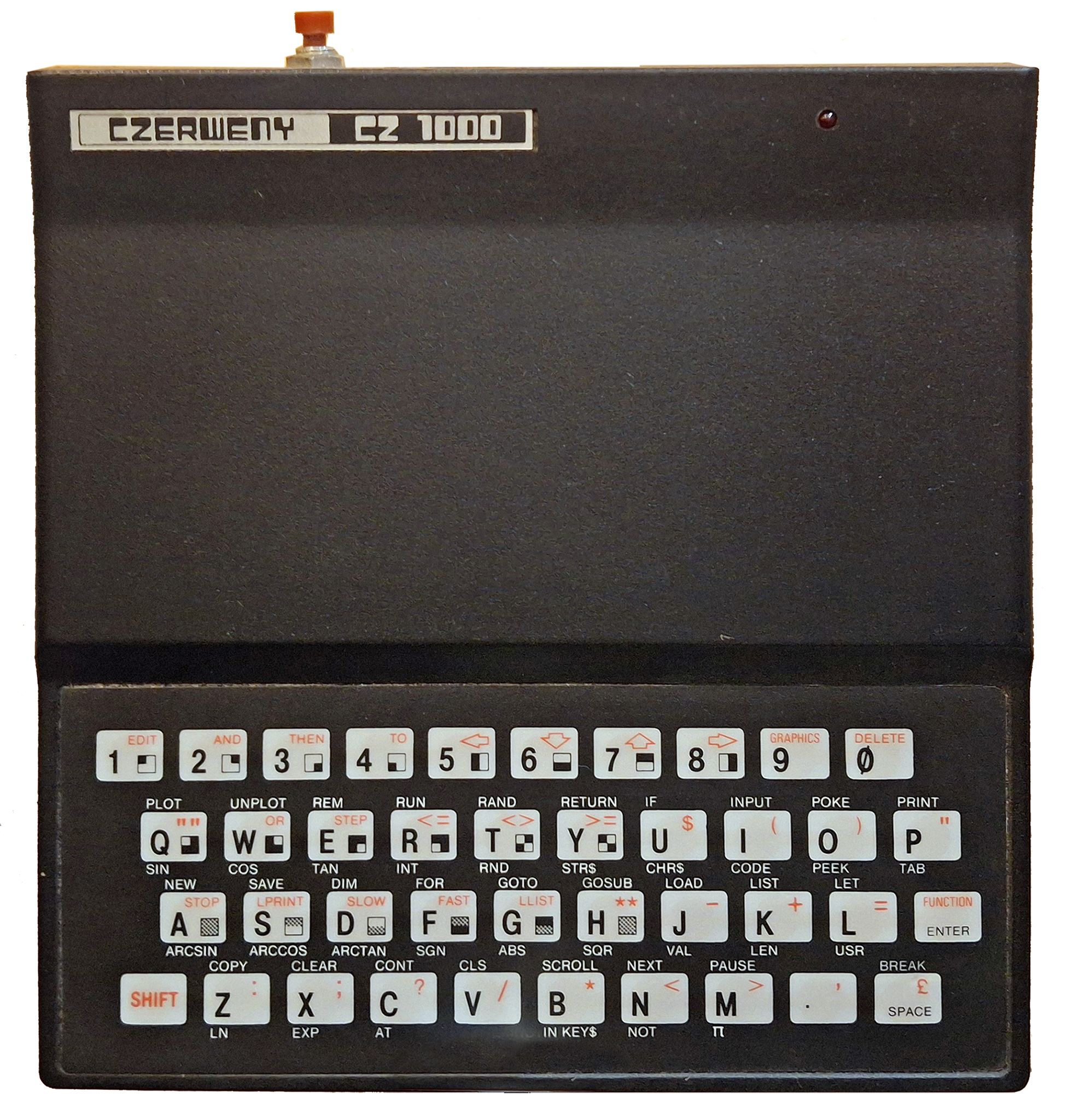
CZ 1000

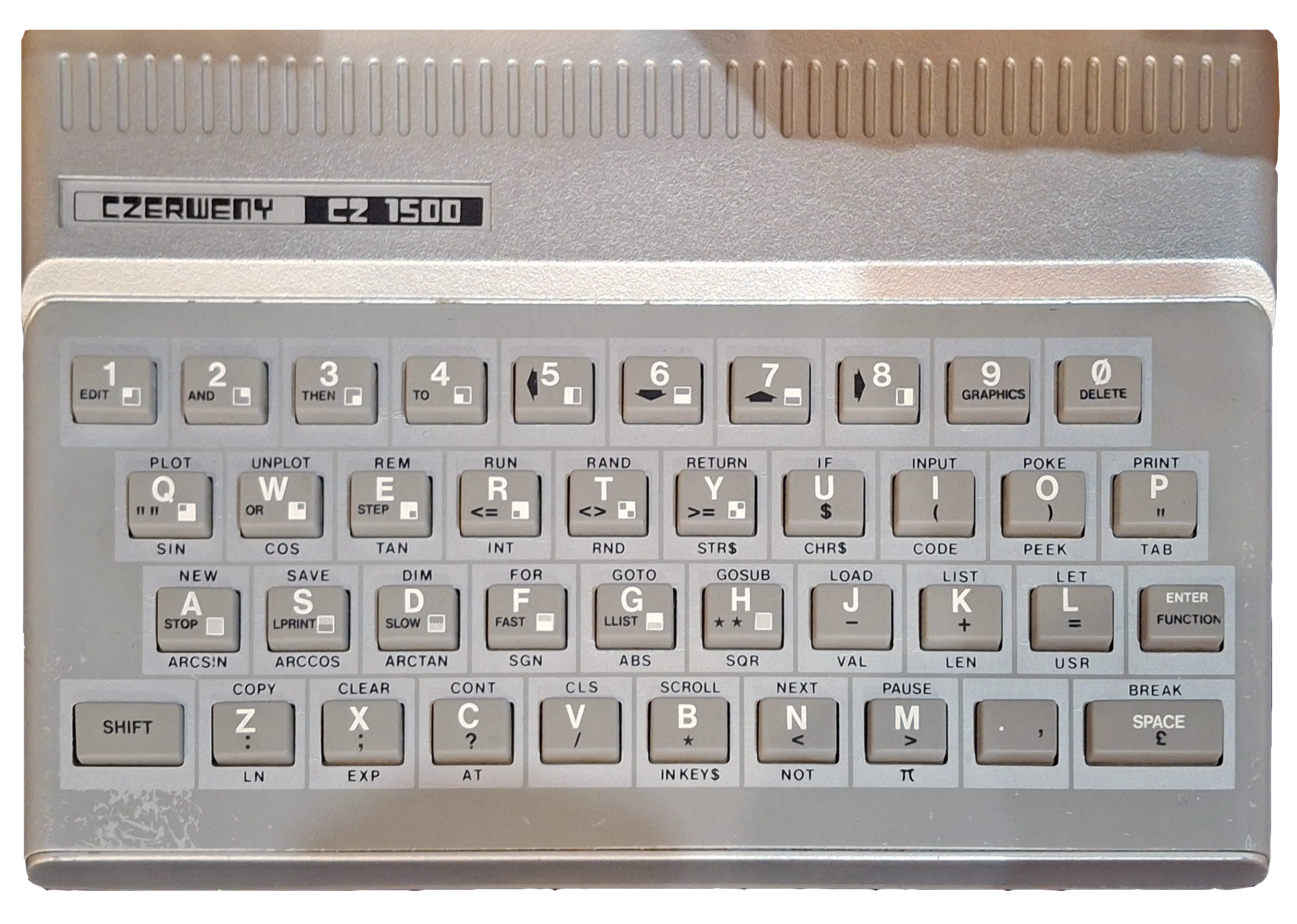
CZ 1500

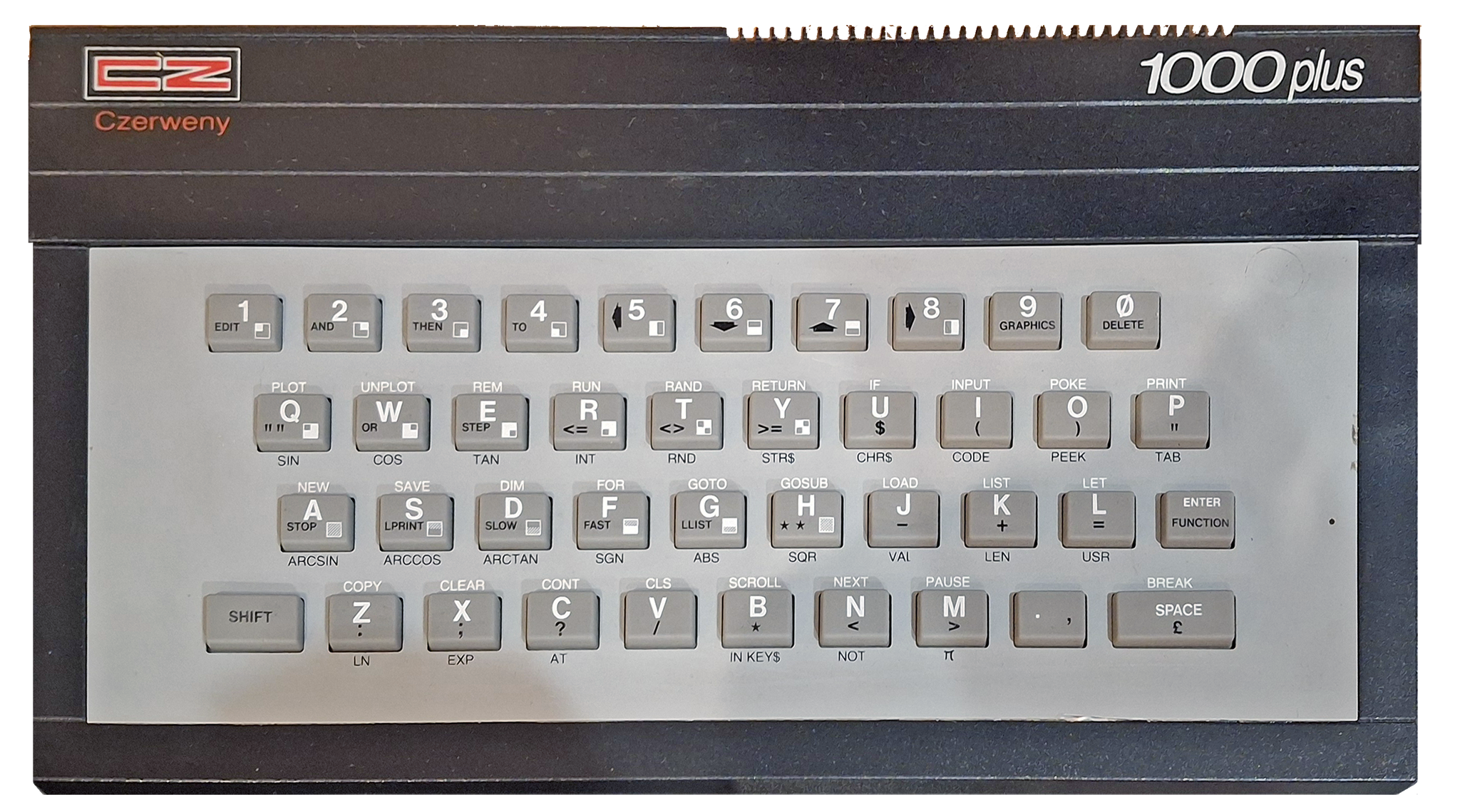
CZ 1000 plus

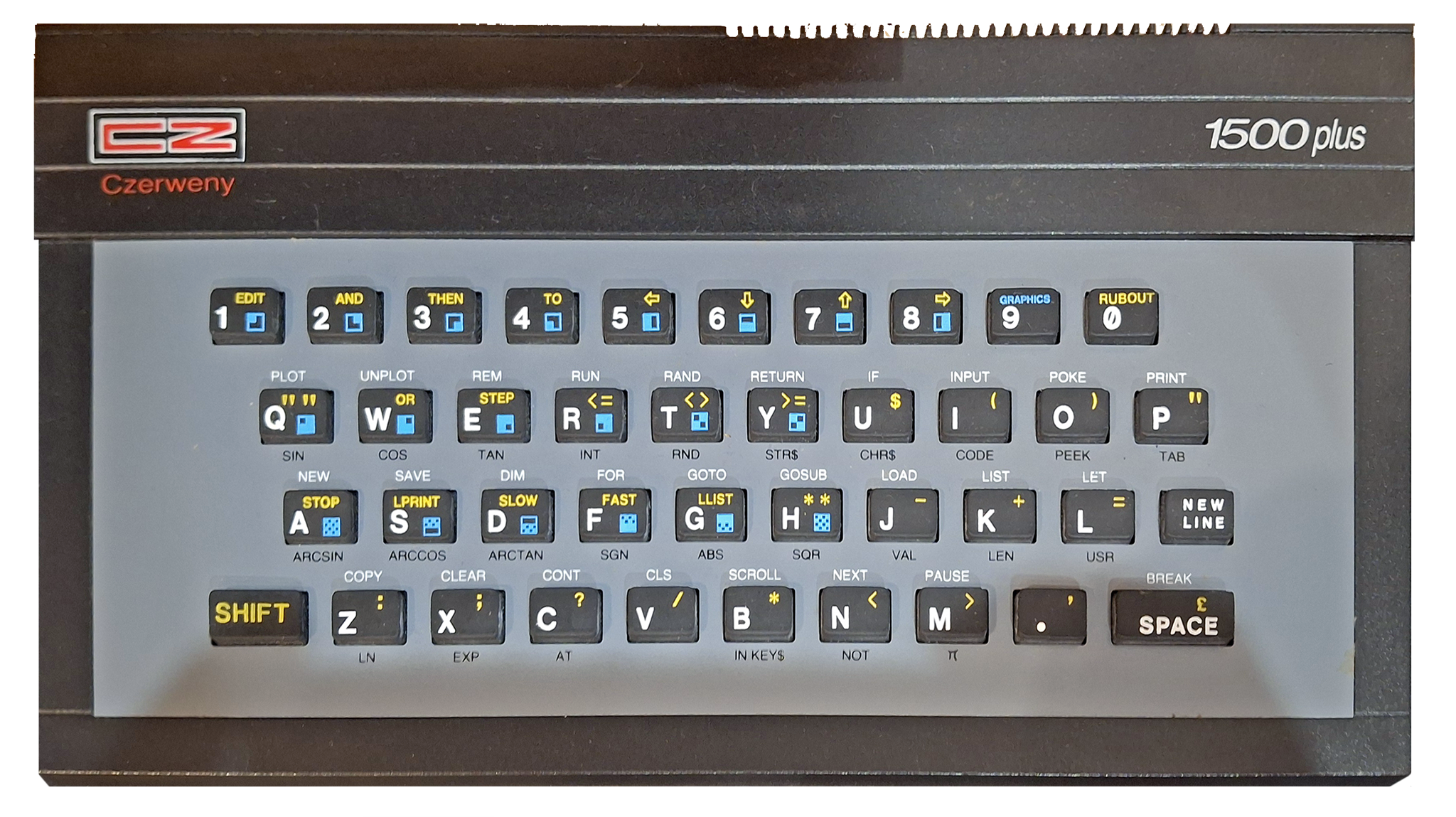
CZ 1500 plus

=== South Korean clones ===
- Samsung SPC-300
- GoldStar FC-30
- Boeun Peek PC-1000 (Timex Sinclair 1000 compatible, 1983)

=== Chinese clones ===
- PZ-80

== Modern clones ==
In recent years retrocomputing enthusiasts created various clones or recreations of the ZX80/ZX81.

- Grant Searle reproduction
- ZX81+38
- ZX80/ZX81 Double Clone and related ZX80/ZX81 Project
- ZX97
- Minstrel
- Wilco/Baffa's one
- TELLAB TL801, an Italian clone designed in 2002 that can emulate both the ZX80 or ZX81. Selection between machines is made via a jumper.
