= Apply 300 =

Brazilian Sinclair ZX81 clone

- Developer: CDSE - Centro de Desenvolvimento de Sistemas Elétricos Ltda.
- Type: Home computer
- Released: 1983; 43 years ago
- Operating system: 8K Sinclair BASIC
- CPU: Z80 at 3.25 MHz
- Memory: 32 to 48 KB
- Removable storage: Audio cassette
- Display: Monochrome TV; 32 x 24 characters, 64 x 48 using semigraphic symbols
- Sound: Beeper
- Input: 69-key chiclet keyboard, cursor keys, numeric keypad
- Connectivity: RS-232C serial port, Joystick port

The Apply 300 was a Brazilian clone of the Sinclair ZX81 introduced by CDSE - Centro de Desenvolvimento de Sistemas Elétricos Ltda.

It came out in 1983, at a time where several clones of popular computers were introduced on the Brazilian market. It competed with machines like the AS-1000, TK83, TK85, Ringo R470 or CP-200, being considered today as a rare machine by computer museums.

== Features ==
General features of the Apply 300 match those of the original ZX81 machine, with a few enhancements.

The power supply was internal and the machine featured a Z80A processor at 3.25 MHz, 8K ROM and 32 or 48 KB of RAM.

The keyboard was chiclet type, but offered 69 keys, including cursor keys and numeric keypad.

It offered an expansion slot at the black, a RS-232C serial port and a joystick port. There was a connection for a cassette tape recorder, with the machine being able to load and save data into tapes at 300 baud.

The Apply 300 could be connected to a standard television over an RF out or composite video connection, providing a monochrome TV signal. Graphics where the regular ZX81 text mode: 32 X 24 characters, with 64 x 44 semigraphics.

The machine was capable of producing simple beeper like sound effects.
