= MicroAce =

Sinclair ZX80 clone

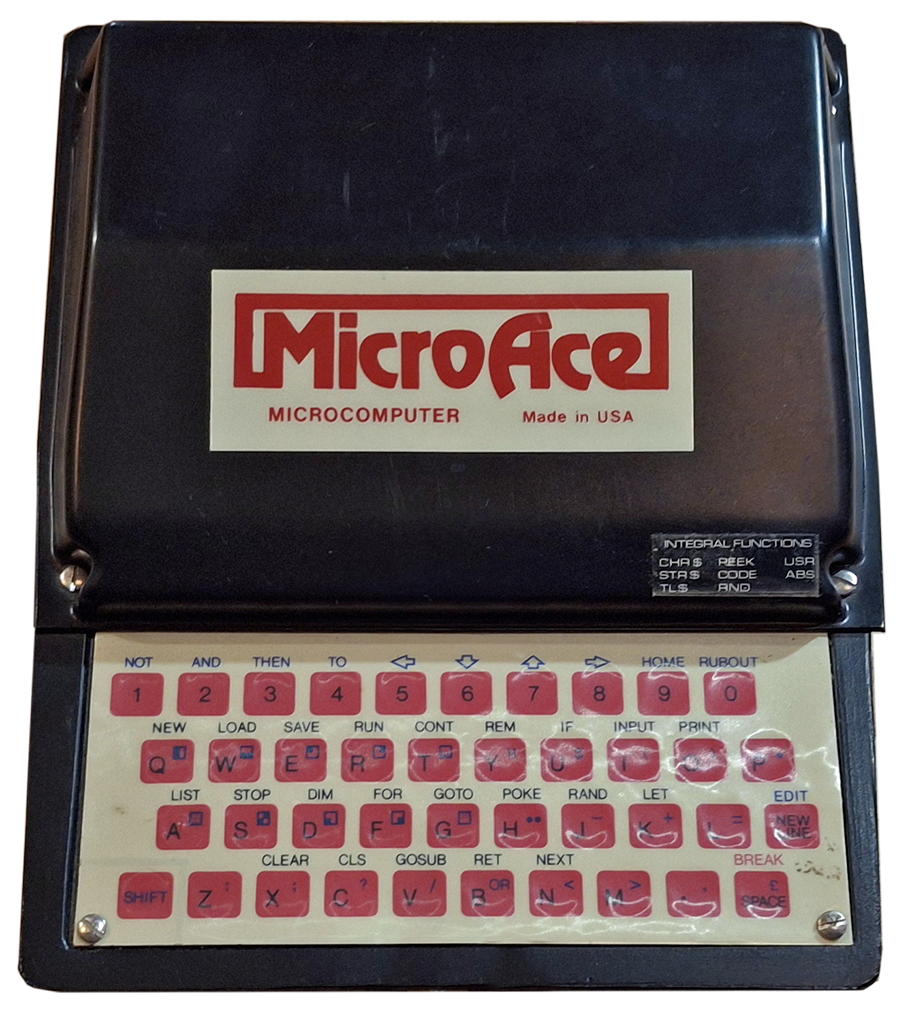
- Manufacturer: CompShop, MicroAce
- Type: Home computer
- Released: 1980; 46 years ago
- Introductory price: $149
- Media: Cassette tape
- Operating system: Sinclair BASIC
- CPU: Z80 @ 3.25 MHz
- Memory: 1 KB
- Display: Monochrome display on UHF television
- Graphics: 24 lines × 32 characters or 64 × 48 block graphics mode
- Backward compatibility: Sinclair ZX80

The MicroAce is a home computer released in 1980 and a clone of the Sinclair ZX80. It was designed and manufactured by CompShop and distributed in the USA by MicroAce of Santa Ana, California.

It was also sold in Australia and distributed there by Dick Smith Electronics.

== Description and history ==
=== Launch ===
Advertised as "a microcomputer for everyone at a micro price ... a complete computer for $149.00 for 1K [RAM] kit" with optional 2K RAM, it was an unlicensed clone of the Sinclair ZX80 and had an identical, yet obfuscated copy of the ROM by means of a bit-swap.

=== Legal action and licensing agreement ===
The ZX80 design had been easily copied due to the fact it used only widely-available off-the-shelf chips and components.

Sinclair sued for breach of copyright on both the ROM and keyboard design. This had mixed results as the judge could not understand the ROM and disagreed that it was protected by copyright, but did agree with Sinclair regarding the keyboard design.

Sinclair was keen to avoid the distraction of legal action, stating that "We mustn't waste time arguing in the courts — this product is a nine months' wonder and we have to use every month". MicroAce settled with Sinclair Research and licensed the design for sale in the US with certain restrictions.

=== Demise ===
When the ZX80's successor, the ZX81, came out in early 1981, Guy Kewney at Personal Computer World considered that its use of a proprietary ULA to replace 18 of the 21 chips in the ZX80 with a single custom-designed ULA significantly reduce both its manufacturing cost and selling price had effectively killed the MicroAce. Unlike the widely-available chips used in the ZX80, the ULA could not be easily replaced or copied by competitors.

Sinclair did not renew CompShop's license to produce the MicroAce after the ZX81 came out, and CompShop left the microcomputer market in mid-1981.

== Reception ==
BYTE stated that the instructions were insufficient for those inexperienced in kit assembly, and suggested that beginners learn how to solder first. It found some fit and finish issues with the completed computer, and criticized MicroAce for being unresponsive to questions. The review stated that "if you recognize the limitations of the machine and don't expect too much, then I think you can buy the MicroAce kit with confidence", albeit strongly recommending the 2K RAM option.
