= ZX80 =

1980 cheap home computer by Sinclair

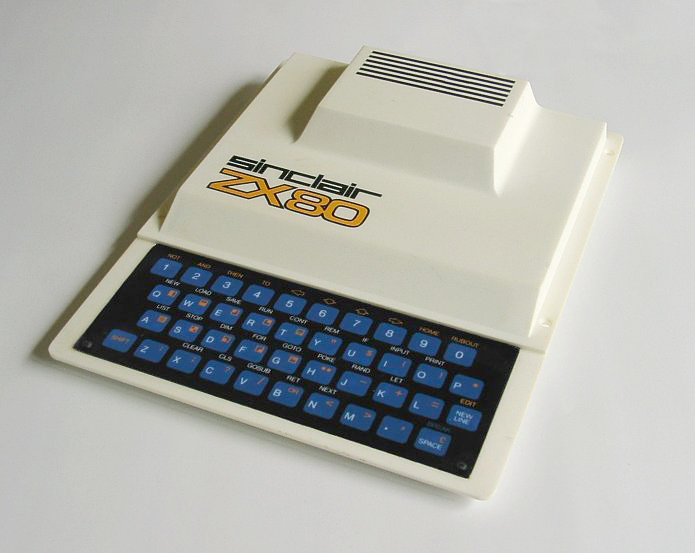
- Type: Home computer
- Released: United Kingdom: 29 January 1980 (46 years ago)
- Introductory price: £99.95 GBP (£429; $588 at 2025 prices)
- Discontinued: 1981
- Units shipped: 100,000
- Media: Cassette tape
- Operating system: Sinclair BASIC
- CPU: Z80 @ 3.25–3.55 MHz (most machines used the NEC μPD780C-1 equivalent)
- Memory: 1 KB (16 KB max.)
- Storage: External Compact Cassette recorder
- Display: Monochrome display on UHF television
- Graphics: 24 lines × 32 characters or; 64 × 48 block graphics mode
- Predecessor: MK14
- Successor: ZX81

The Sinclair ZX80 is a home computer launched on 29 January 1980 by Science of Cambridge Ltd. (later to be better known as Sinclair Research). It was one of the first computers available in the United Kingdom for less than a hundred pounds. It was available in kit form for £79.95, where purchasers had to assemble and solder it together, and as a ready-built version at £99.95.

The ZX80 was advertised as the first personal computer for under £100 and received praise for its value and documentation. However, it faced criticism for screen blanking during program execution, small RAM size, and the keyboard design. It was very popular straight away, and for some time there was a waiting list of several months for either version of the machine.

== Name ==
The ZX80 was named after the Z80 processor with the "X" meaning "the mystery ingredient".

== Hardware ==
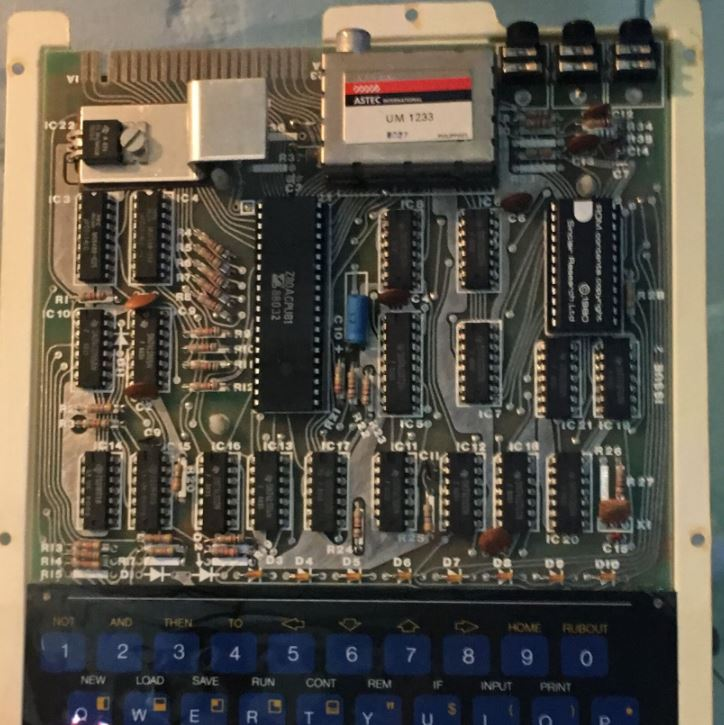
Inside the ZX80: The Z80 is the large chip in center. 4K ROM is the medium-sized chip in the upper right. 1K RAM is implemented by two chips in the upper left. The video modulator is the metal box at the top.

Internally, the machine was designed by Jim Westwood around a Z80 central processing unit with a clock speed of 3.25 MHz, and is equipped with 1 KB of static RAM and 4 KB of read-only memory (ROM). It has no sound output.

The ZX80 is designed around readily available TTL ICs, without any custom chips; the only proprietary technology is the firmware.

The machine is mounted in a small white plastic case, with a one-piece blue membrane keyboard on the front. There were problems with durability, reliability and overheating (despite appearances, the black stripes visible on the top rear of the case are merely cosmetic, and are not ventilation slots).

Video output is black-and-white, character-based. However, the ZX80 character set includes some simple block-based graphics glyphs, allowing basic graphics to be accomplished, with some effort. One advantage to using monochrome video is that different colour broadcast standards (e.g. PAL, SECAM) simply were not an issue when the system was sold outside the UK. The NTSC standard was different enough that it required a hardware change (including an extra diode).

Display was over an RF connection to a household television, and simple offline program storage was possible using a cassette recorder. The video display generator of the ZX80 used minimal hardware plus a combination of software to generate a video signal. This solution was "strikingly similar" to an idea popularised by Don Lancaster in his 1978 book The TV Cheap Video Cookbook and his "TV Typewriter". However, that design does not involve a microprocessor for video generation, and is not similar to the ZX80 in other aspects either. The ZX80 and ZX81 also employ very specific traits of the Z80 processor.)

Unlike the later follow up, ZX81, the ZX80 can only generate a picture when it is idle, i.e. waiting for a key to be pressed. When running a BASIC program, or when pressing a key during editing, the TV display therefore blanks out (loses synchronisation) momentarily while the processor is busy. So a BASIC program has to introduce a pause for input to display the next change in graphical output, making smooth moving graphics impossible. This can be overcome only by very clever machine code tricks. These effectively have to replace the video rountines in ROM and embed the same in the normal program logic with exact timing, which is extremely cumbersome. However, a few such games were developed by skilled users or programmers later on.

== Firmware ==
The 4 KB ROM contains the Sinclair BASIC programming language, editor, and operating system. BASIC commands are not entered by typing them out but are instead selected somewhat similarly to a programmable graphing calculator – each key has a few different functions selected by both context and modes as well as with the shift key.

== Expansion ==
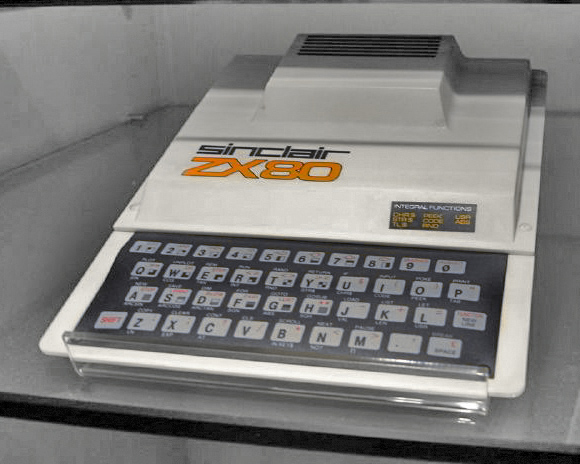
Upgraded ZX80 showing the ZX81-style replacement keyboard overlay for use with the 8K ROM

Other than the built-in cassette and video ports, the only provided means of expansion is a slot opening at the rear of the case, which exposes an expansion bus edge connector on the motherboard. The same slot bus was continued on the ZX81, and later the ZX Spectrum, which encouraged a small cottage industry of expansion devices, including memory packs, printers and even floppy drives. The original Sinclair ZX80 RAM Pack holds either 1, 2 or 3 KB of static RAM and a later model holds 16 KB of dynamic RAM (DRAM). With software, the computer can use up to 48 KB of memory.

Following the ZX81's release, a ZX81 8 KB ROM was released to upgrade the ZX80 at a cost of around 20% of a real ZX81. It comes with a thin keyboard overlay and a ZX81 manual. By simply taking off the top cover of the ZX80 and prying the old ROM from its socket and carefully inserting the new ROM and adding the keyboard overlay, the ZX80 functions almost identically to the proper ZX81 – except for SLOW mode, due to the differences in hardware between the two models. The process is easily reversed to return the ZX80 to its original configuration.

One common modification by hobbyist users is to attach a full-size keyboard, optionally moving the motherboard into a larger case. This has the dual advantages of making the machine easier to type on, while increasing ventilation to the motherboard.

== Versions ==
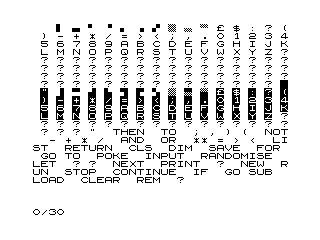
Character set of the ZX80. It does not use ASCII coding. Unimplemented characters display "?". Codes above 213 render as multiple characters to save screen memory.

The UK version of the machine was the standard, and only changes that were absolutely necessary to sell units in other markets were made. In fact, the only real change made in most markets involved the video output frequency (the ZX80 used an external power transformer, so differences in AC line frequency and outlet were not an issue to the machine itself). One outcome of this is that the machine had some keyboard keys and characters that were distinctly British: NEWLINE was used instead of ↵ Enter, RUBOUT instead of ← Backspace or DELETE, and the character set and keyboard included the pound sign (£).

== Reception ==
The ZX80 was widely advertised as the first personal computer for under £100 (US$200). Kilobaud Microcomputing liked the design of the preassembled version, and said that the screen flickering during input or output was annoying but useful as an undocumented feature, indicating the computer functioning correctly. It praised the documentation as excellent for novices, and noted that purchasing the computer was cheaper than taking a college class on BASIC. The magazine concluded, "The ZX-80 is a real computer and an excellent value", but only for beginners who could learn from the documentation or programmers experienced with writing Z80 software. BYTE called the ZX80 a "remarkable device". It praised the real-time, interactive BASIC syntax checking, and reported that the computer performed better on benchmarks than some competitors, including the TRS-80 Model I. The magazine criticised the screen blanking during program execution, small RAM size, inadequate built-in Sinclair BASIC, and keyboard, and recommended against buying the kit version given difficulty of assembly and because purchasers did not save money. BYTE concluded that "the ZX80 might be summarized as a high-performance, very low-cost, portable personal computer system ... a good starting point".

Sales of the ZX80 reached about 50,000, which contributed significantly to the UK leading the world in home computer ownership through the 1980s. Owing to the unsophisticated design and the tendency for the units to overheat, surviving machines in good condition are sought after and can fetch high prices by collectors.

== Clones ==
There were also clones of the ZX80, such as the MicroAce, and from Brazil the Nova Eletrônica/Prológica NE-Z80 and the Microdigital TK80.

== See also ==
- ZX80 character set
