= Lambda 8300 =

Sinclair ZX81 clone from Lambda Electronics Limited of Hong Kong

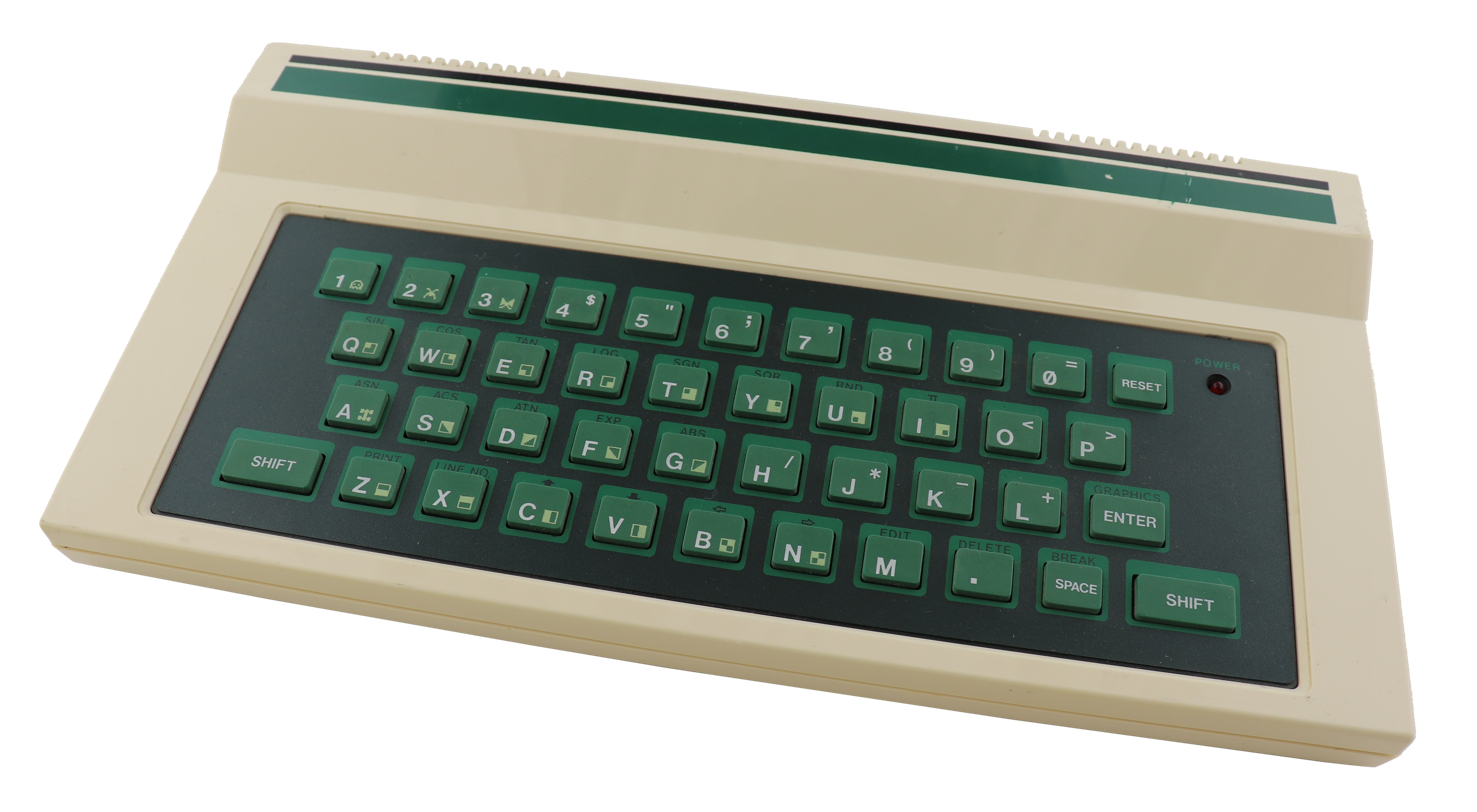
- Lambda 8300 front
- Manufacturer: Lambda Electronics Limited
- Released: 1983
- Operating system: BASIC
- CPU: NEC D780C-1 @ 3,25 MHz
- Memory: 2KiB, 16KiB, or 32KiB
- Storage: Audio cassette
- Display: UHF TV signal, PAL video out (built-in RCA connector); monochrome, 32 x 24 characters, 64 x 48 using semigraphic symbols
- Graphics: C4005 ULA I/O chip
- Sound: C4005 (1 voice, 3 octaves)
- Input: Tape interface (audio in / out), expansion bus, Atari joystick port
- Dimensions: 295 × 150 × 55 mm (12 × 6 × 2 inches)
- Weight: 700g (2 lbs)
- Backward compatibility: ZX81

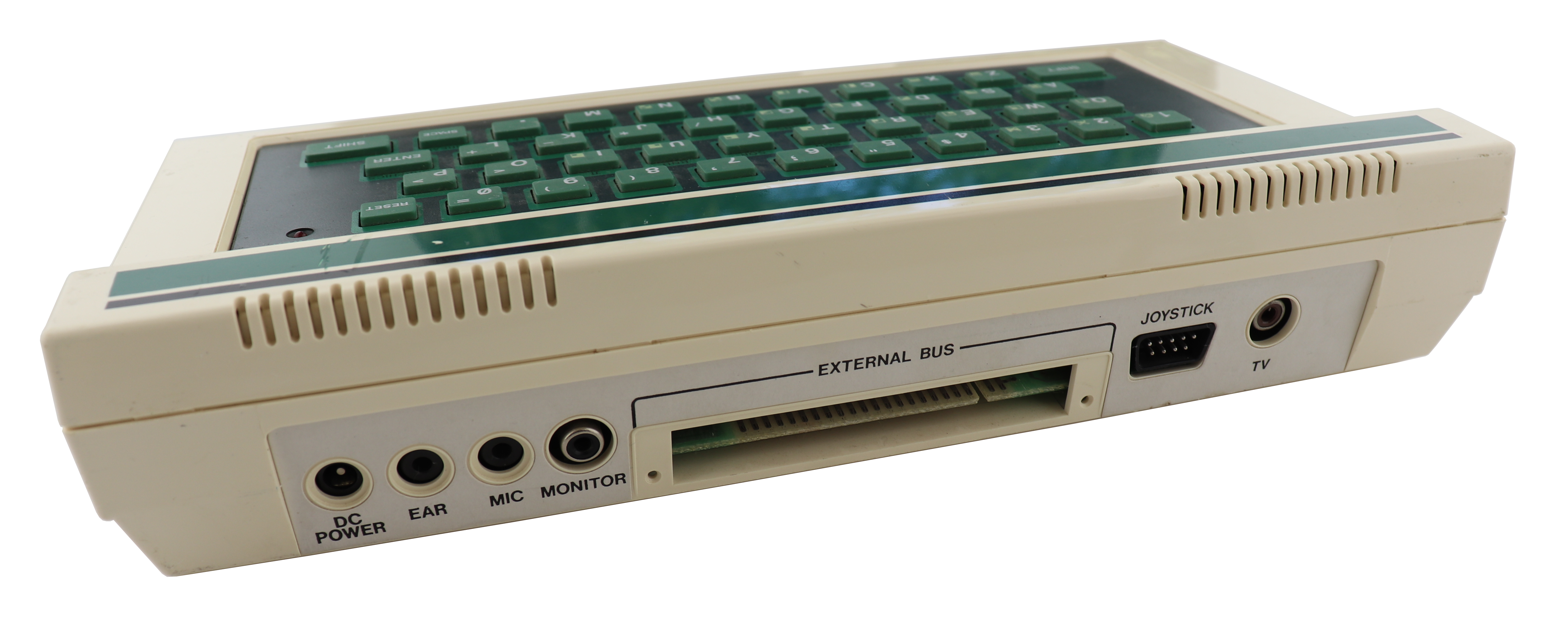
Back of Lambda 8300

The Lambda 8300 was a Sinclair ZX81 clone from Lambda Electronics Limited of Hong Kong. It had a modified ROM (including extra semigraphic characters) and extra hardware, making it not fully compatible. Total compatibility could be achieved by installing a ZX81 ROM.

It came with 2K RAM (expandable to 16K or 32K), three octave single voice sound (generated by a C4005 ULA I/O chip) and an Atari joystick port. Specifically, it used a NEC D780C-1 (Z80A clone) microprocessor at 3.25 MHz.

The character set was slightly altered from the ZX81, replacing some symbols with game graphics (see below). BASIC tokens have alternate codings, further preventing 100% compatibility with the ZX81. Command input is done key by key (not by keyword entry like on the ZX81).

The computer was somewhat successful in Northern Europe (mostly in Denmark and Norway) and China, and today enthusiasts still develop new hardware.

The Lambda 8300 can be emulated on modern systems using, for example, the EightyOne Sinclair Emulator or MAME.

== Models ==
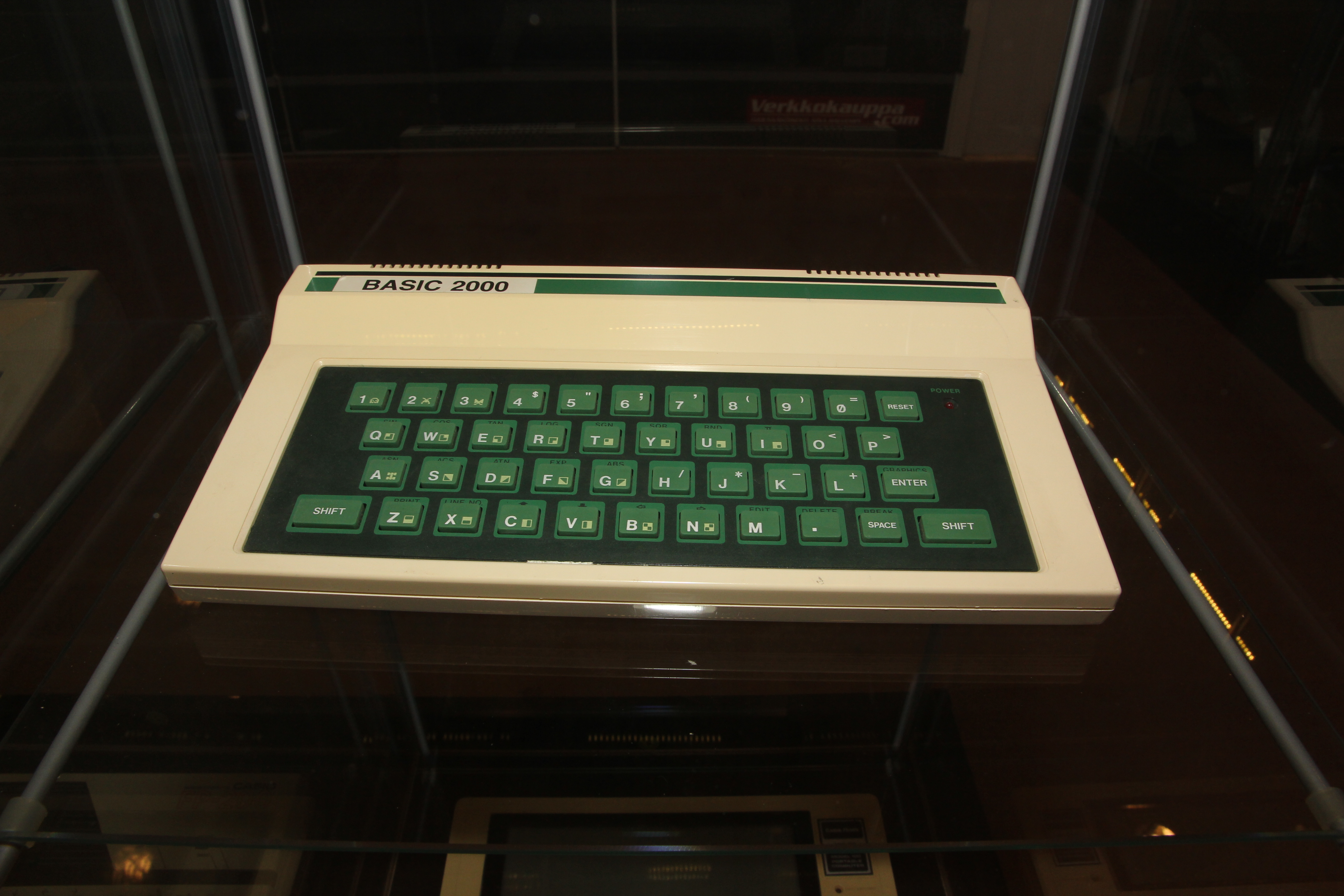
BASIC 2000, a Lambda 8300 clone

The machine was licensed to several different companies, with many rebranded models available in different markets. Unisonic distributed it as the Futura 8300 in the US. In France it was available as the DEF 3000.

Known model designations:

- Lambda 8300 (Hong Kong, Sweden, Norway, Denmark)
- Your Computer PC 8300 (China, United States)
- DEF 3000 (France)
- Basic 2000 (Norway, Sweden, Finland)
- Marathon 32K (Norway, Denmark)
- Tonel PC (Italy, Germany)
- Unisonic Futura 8300 (United States)
- PC-81 Personal Computer (China)
- CAC-3 (China)
- Polybrain P118 (New Zealand)
- Creon Electronics Power 3000 (Hong Kong, Germany, Denmark, Canada)
- NF300 jiaoXueDianNao (China)
- Basic 2000
- Basic 3000
- PC 2000

== Character set ==
The character set was slightly altered from that of the ZX81, replacing the ,, ?, £, and ' symbols with game graphics:,, and. BASIC tokens also have alternate codings.

Lambda 8300 character set
	0	1	2	3	4	5	6	7	8	9	A	B	C	D	E	F
0x	space	▘	▝	▀	▖	▌	▞	▛		◤	◥	"		$		
1x	(	)	>	<	=	+	-	*	/	;	,	.	0	1	2	3
2x	4	5	6	7	8	9	A	B	C	D	E	F	G	H	I	J
3x	K	L	M	N	O	P	Q	R	S	T	U	V	W	X	Y	Z
4x	THEN	TO	STEP	RND	INKEY$	PI										
5x																
6x																
7x	up	down	left	right	GRAPHICS	EDIT	ENTER	DELETE	LMODE	BREAK	LINE NO.				number	cursor
8x	▉	▟	▙	▃	▜	▐	▚	▗		◢	◣	"		$		
9x	(	)	>	<	=	+	-	*	/	;	,	.	0	1	2	3
Ax	4	5	6	7	8	9	A	B	C	D	E	F	G	H	I	J
Bx	K	L	M	N	O	P	Q	R	S	T	U	V	W	X	Y	Z
Cx	CODE	VAL	LEN	SIN	COS	TAN	ASN	ACS	ATN	LOG	EXP	INT	SQR	SGN	ABS	PEEK
Dx	USR	STR$	CHR$	NOT	AT	TAB	**	OR	AND	<=	>=	<>	TEMPO	MUSIC	SOUND	BEEP
Ex	NOBEEP	LPRINT	LLIST	STOP	SLOW	FAST	NEW	SCROLL	CONT	DIM	REM	FOR	GOTO	GOSUB	INPUT	LOAD
Fx	LIST	LET	PAUSE	NEXT	POKE	PRINT	PLOT	RUN	SAVE	RAND	IF	CLS	UNPLOT	CLEAR	RETURN	COPY
Code formatting indicates BASIC keywords tokenized into single-byte code points.
