= Czerweny Electrónica =

Argentinian Sinclair computer clones

- Industry: Home Computer
- Founded: 1985
- Defunct: 1986
- Headquarters: Paraná, Argentina
- Owners: Tadeo Czerweny S.A.

Tadeo Czerweny S.A. is an Argentinian manufacturer of transformers and other high-power electrical equipment founded by Tadeo Czerweny in 1958.

In 1985 they entered microcomputer field as Czerweny Electrónica, by marketing three rebranded Timex Sinclair models assembled in Argentina: the CZ 1000, CZ 1500 and CZ 2000.

These machines had their hardware supplied by Timex Portugal, the Portuguese branch of Timex Sinclair. Since Czerweny computers used Timex Sinclair chips and ROMs, their compatibility was close to 100% relative to the original Sinclair machines. They also look similar to the original Timex models. The CZ 1000 was a relabeled Timex Sinclair 1000, the CZ 1500 was similar to the Timex Sinclair 1500 and the CZ 2000 is a Spectrum compatible in a Timex Sinclair 1500 case.

Afterwards, imported components were replaced with locally produced variants, and extra modifications were added, like a joystick port, composite monitor output and a restart button. This gave origin to new models, released in 1986 with original Czerweny cases: CZ 1000 Plus, CZ 1500 Plus, CZ Spectrum and CZ Spectrum Plus. About 4000 machines were produced each month. Czerweny models competed in Argentina with the Brazilian TK83, 85, 90x and genuine Sinclair machines, but were more successful.

The Paraná, Entre Rios province factory was destroyed by a fire in 1986, eventually ending Czerweny computer production.

== Machines ==
=== CZ 1000 ===
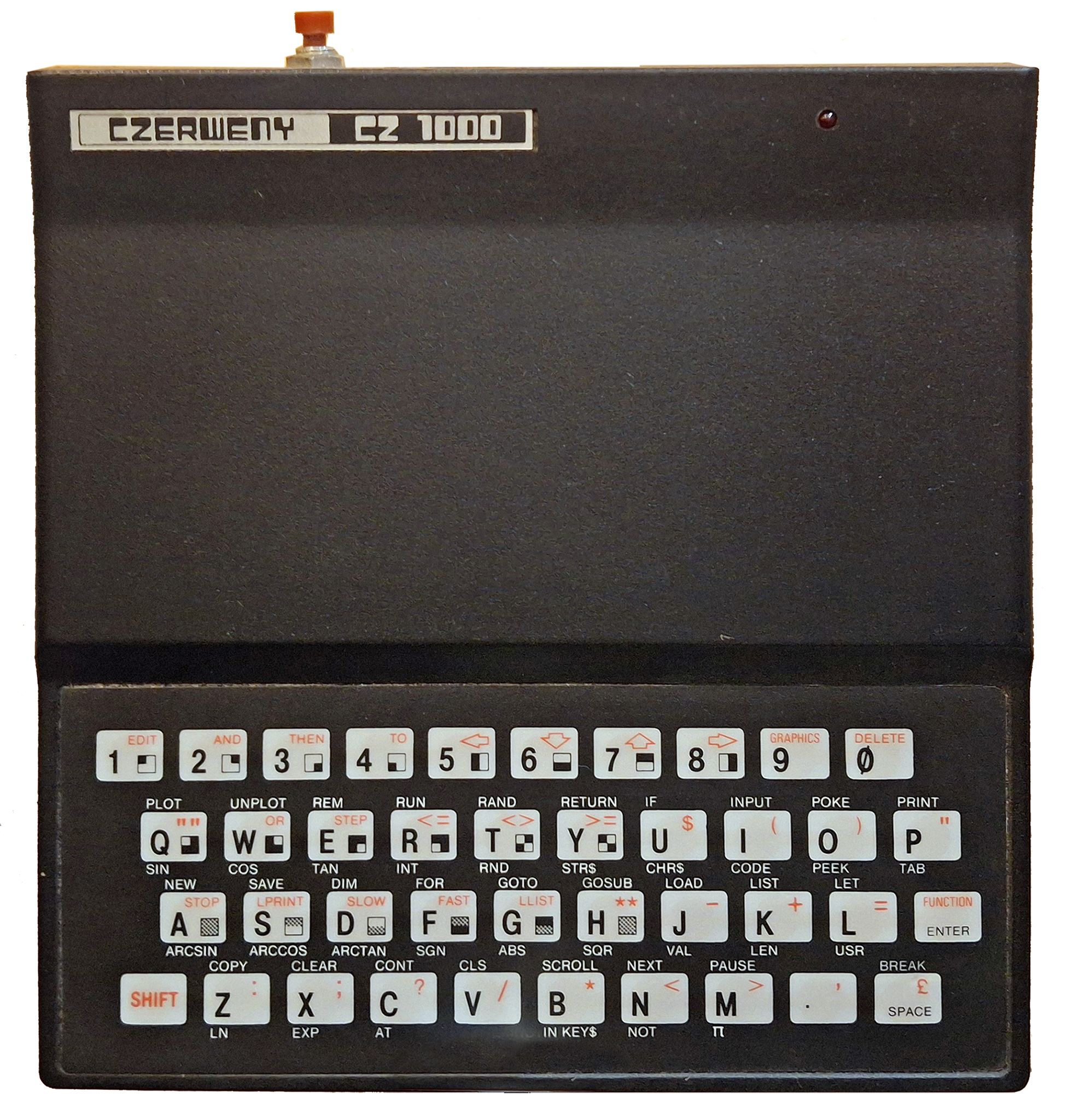
CZ 1000

Released in 1985, the CZ 1000 was a rebranded version of the Timex Sinclair 1000, itself a clone of the Sinclair ZX81. This compact and minimalist machine came equipped with just 2 KB of RAM, making it an entry-level computer ideal for beginners and enthusiasts.

=== CZ 1500 ===
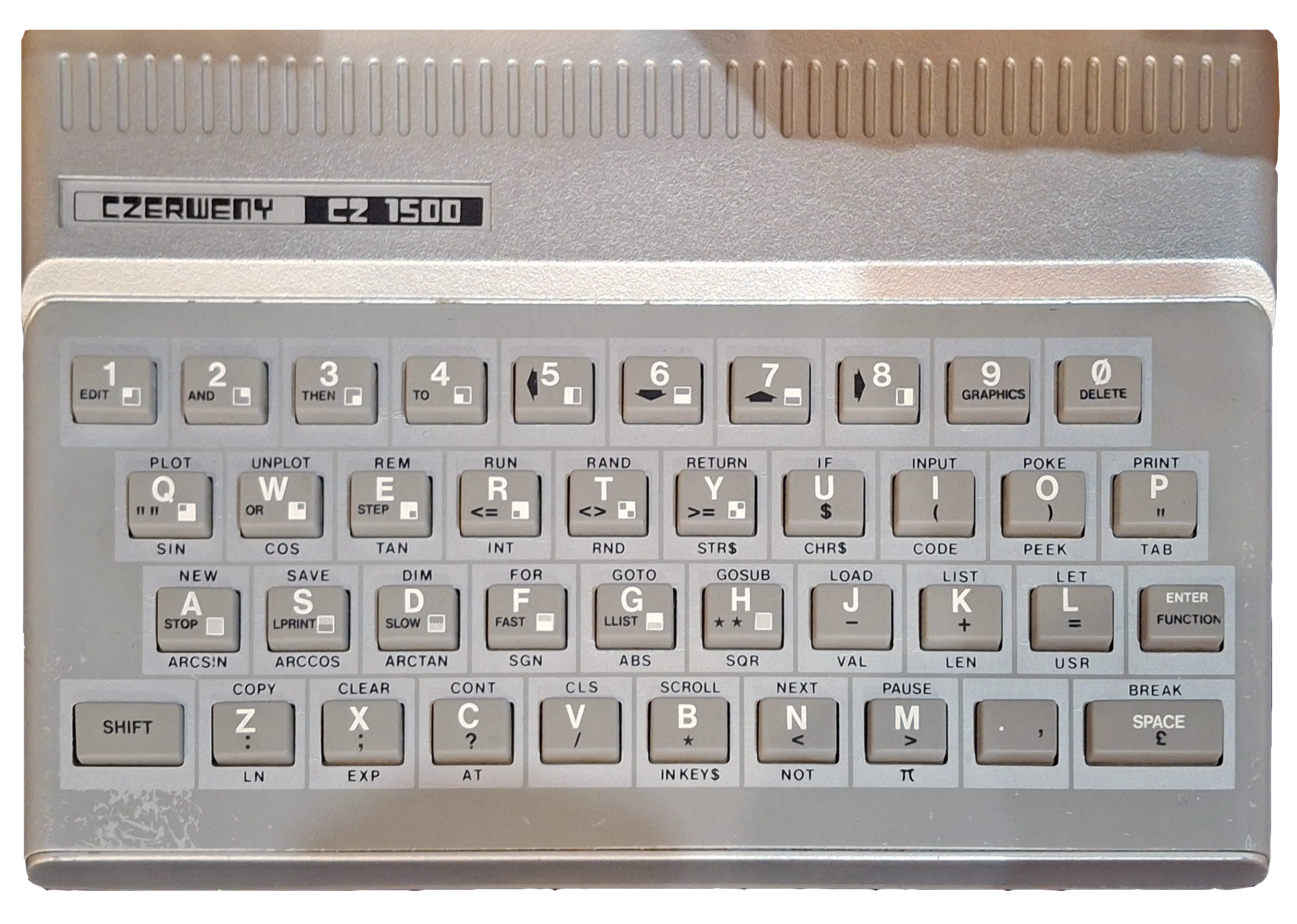
CZ 1500

Building on the CZ 1000, the CZ 1500 was a relabeled Timex Sinclair 1500, which offered an upgraded 16 KB of RAM. It maintained the simple design of the ZX81 while providing the additional memory needed for more complex applications and programs.

=== CZ 2000 ===
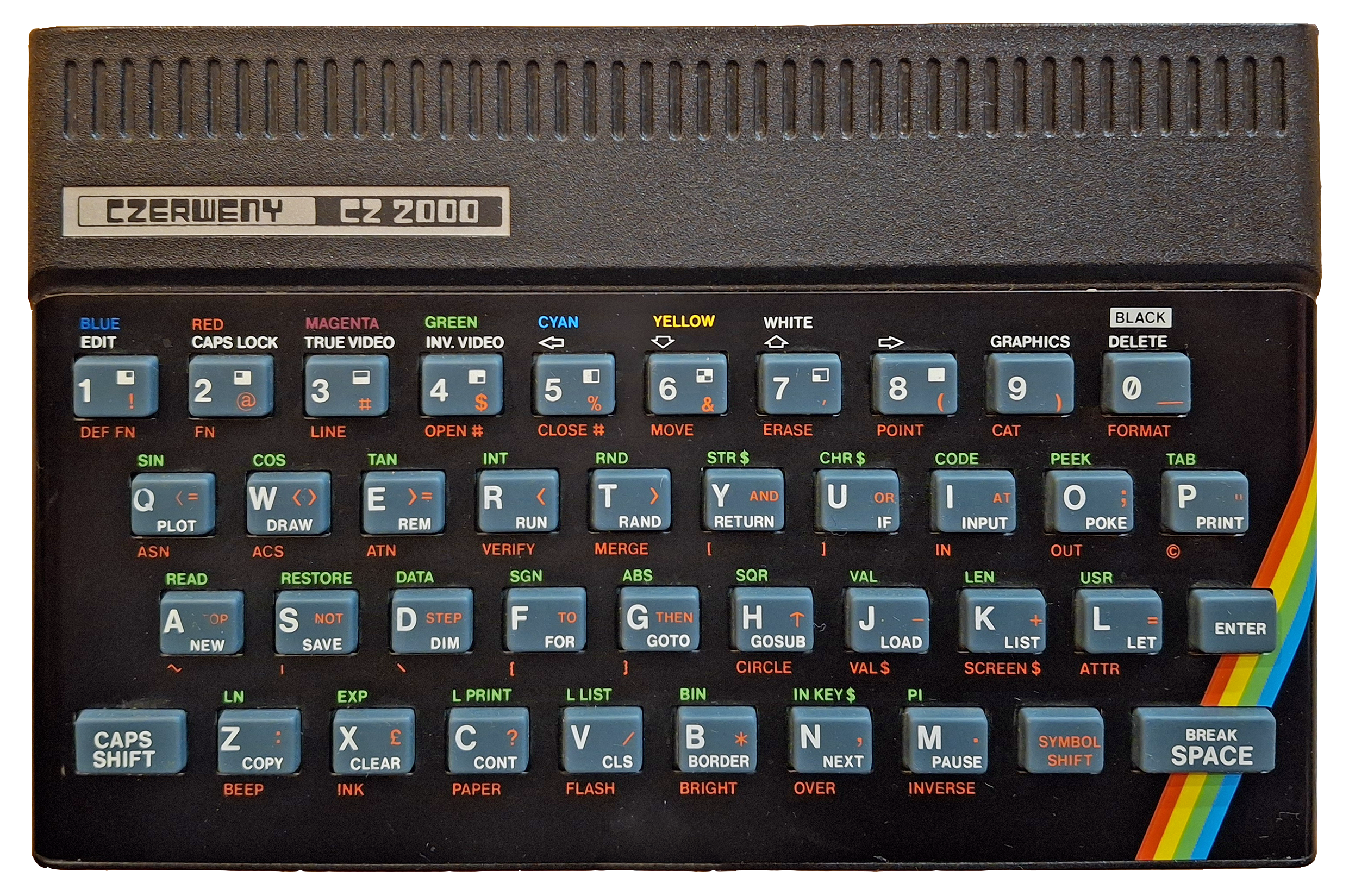
CZ 2000

The CZ 2000 represented a significant evolution, as it was a ZX Spectrum clone. It featured a similar casing to the CZ 1500 but included a ZX Spectrum rainbow logo, signaling its compatibility with the popular machine. This marked Czerweny’s move towards more advanced computing capabilities, including improved graphics and sound.

=== CZ 1000 plus ===
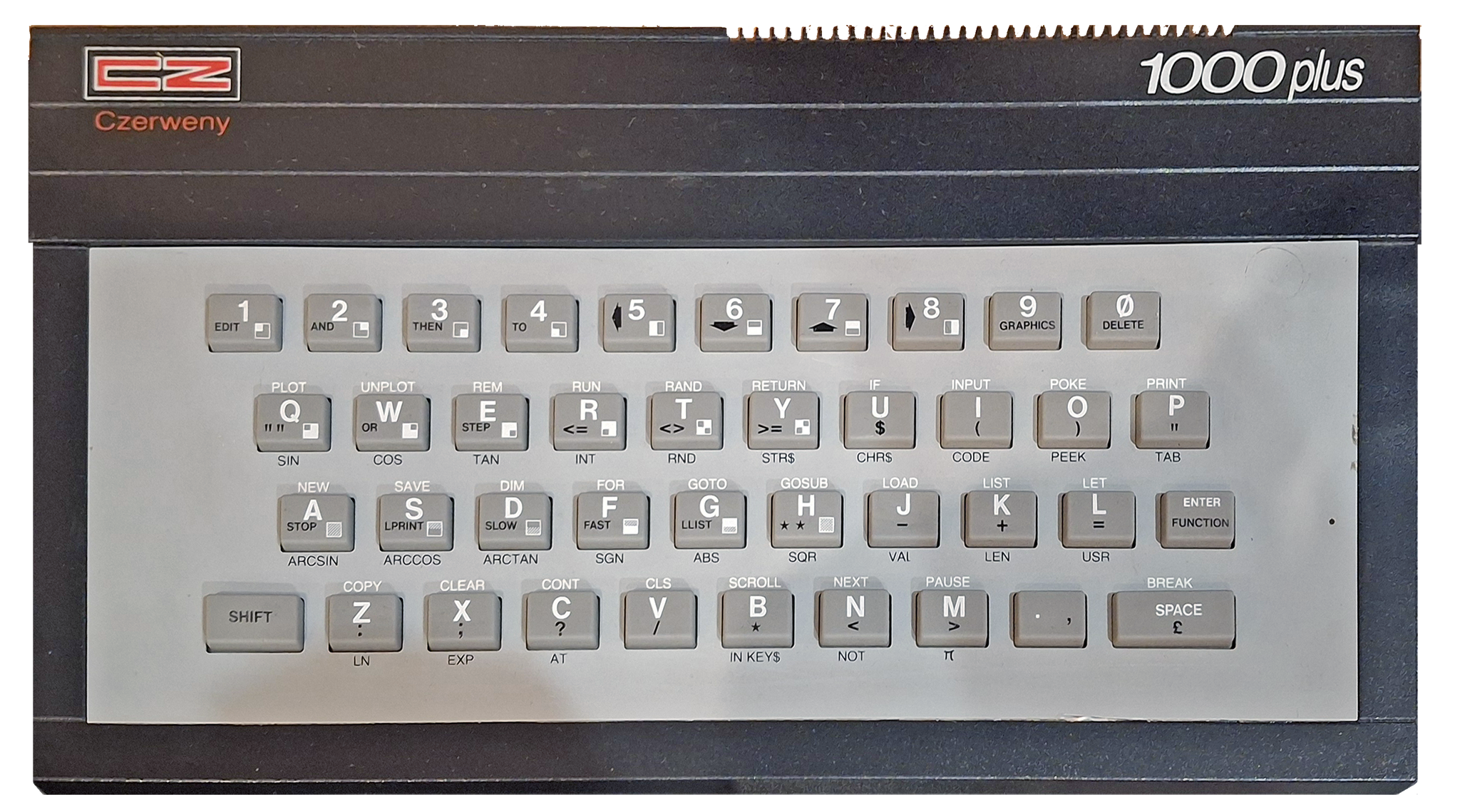
CZ 1000 plus

Introduced in 1986, the CZ 1000 plus introduced key enhancements to the original CZ 1000. It adopted a new case design, featuring rubber keys, along with two joystick ports, composite monitor output for clearer video, and a reset button. These improvements made it more appealing for gaming and advanced use, offering a more modern computing experience.

=== CZ 1500 plus ===
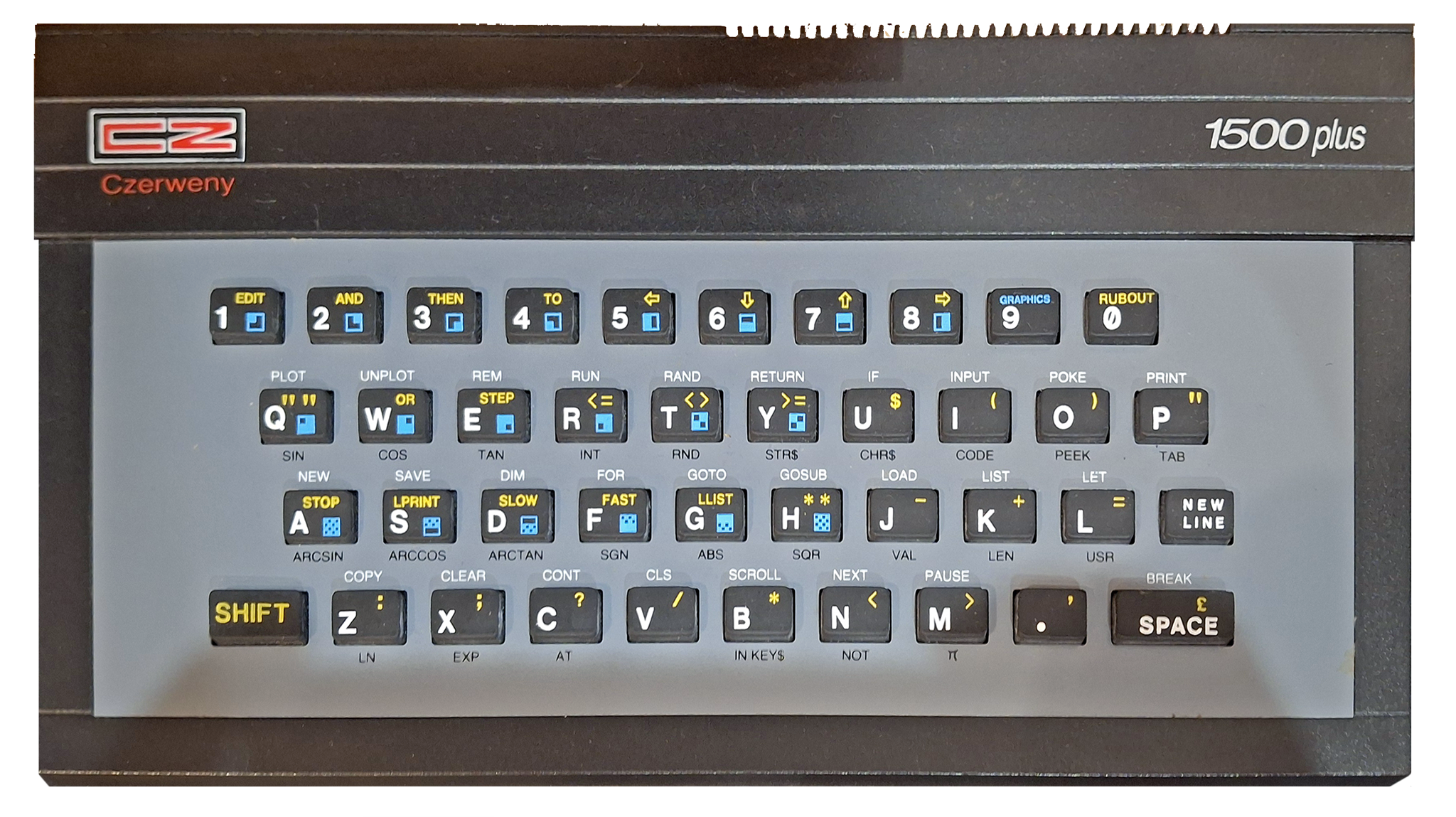
CZ 1500 plus

Also introduced in 1986, the CZ 1500 plus upgraded the CZ 1500 with the same suite of enhancements found in the CZ 1000 Plus.

=== CZ Spectrum ===
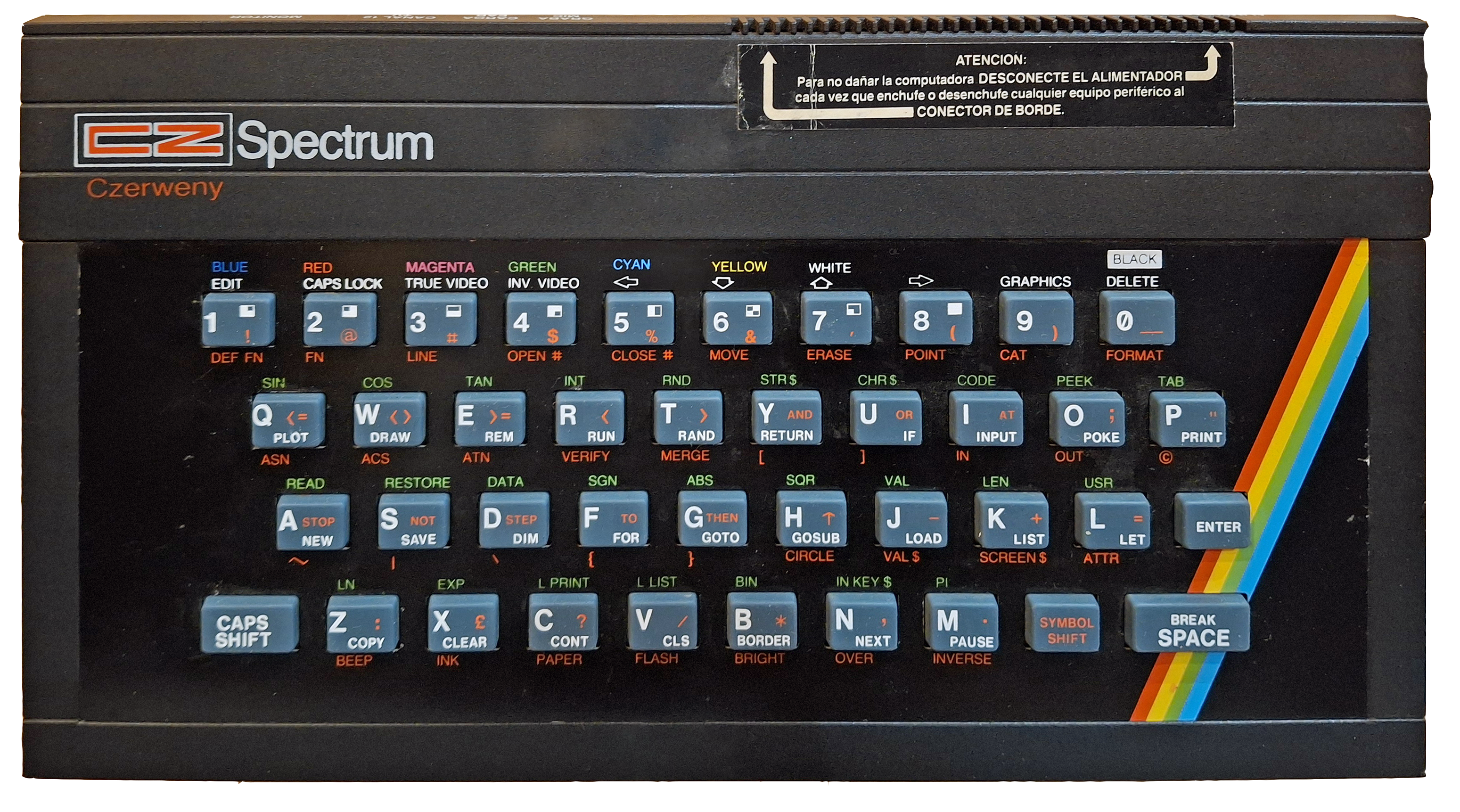
CZ Spectrum

Introduced in 1986, the CZ Spectrum was essentially a CZ 2000 in a larger case that incorporated the enhancements introduced with the CZ 1000 Plus. It maintained ZX Spectrum compatibility while offering a more robust design featuring rubber keys, joystick port, and a reset button.

=== CZ Spectrum plus ===
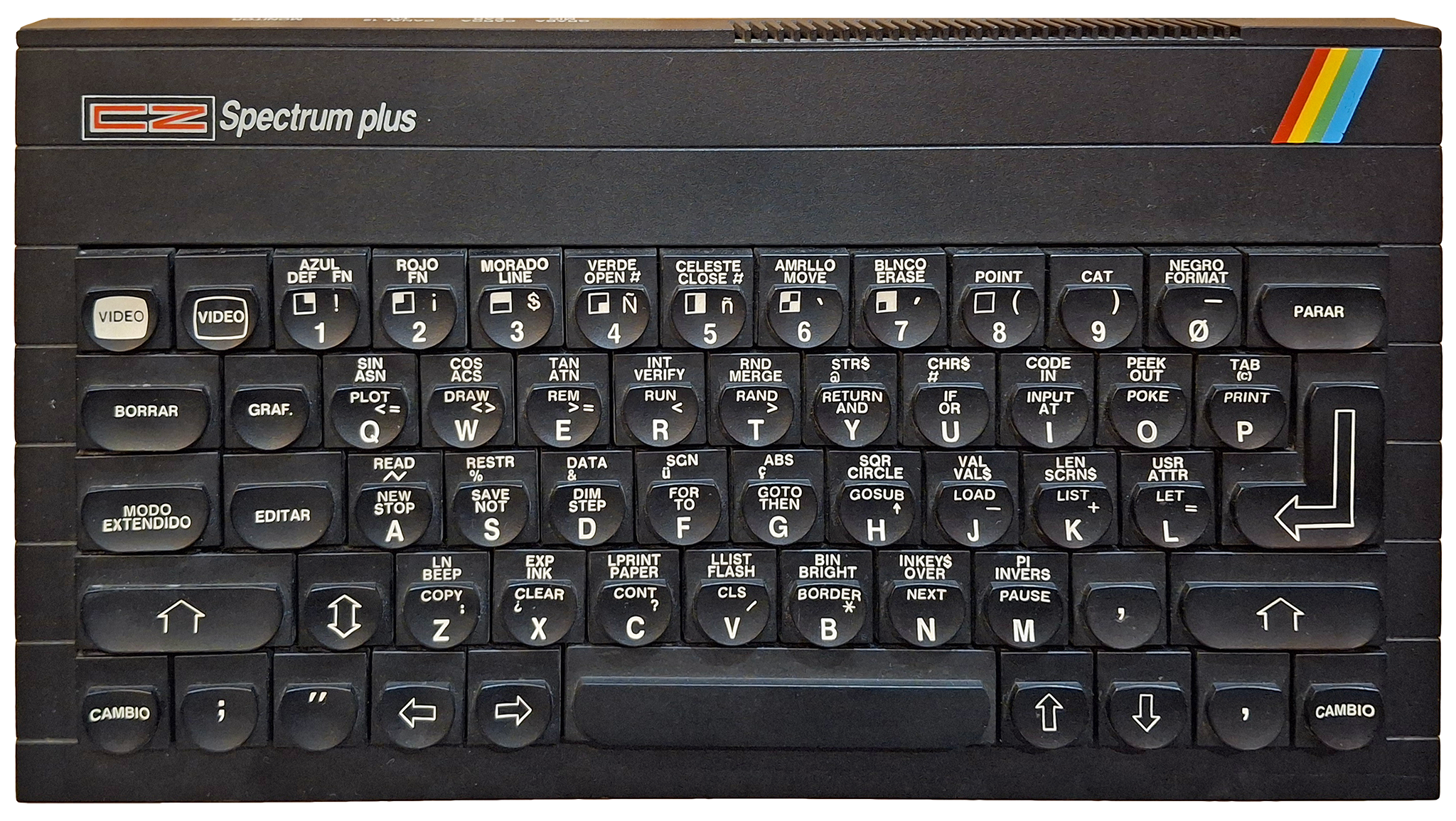
CZ Spectrum plus

Introduced in 1987, the CZ Spectrum plus was a refined version of the Sinclair ZX Spectrum, housed in a Spectrum+ style case. This model included joystick ports, composite monitor output, and a reset button, but it also featured a unique local adaptation: the Sinclair BASIC messages were translated into Spanish, making the system more accessible and user-friendly for the Argentinian market.
