= NE-Z80 =

Brazilian homebuilt computer clone of the Sinclair ZX80, introduced in late 1981

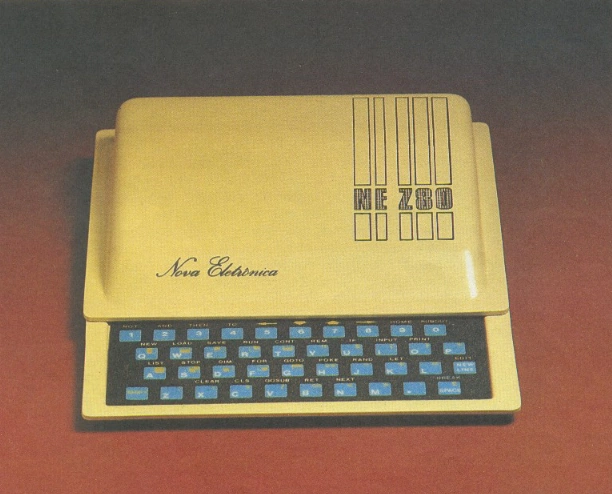
- Manufacturer: Prológica
- Type: Homebuilt computer
- Released: Brazil: October 1981; 44 years ago
- Introductory price: Cr$ 59,900
- Media: Cassette tape
- Operating system: Sinclair BASIC
- CPU: Z80A @ 3.25 MHz
- Memory: 1 KiB (extendable to 16 KiB)
- Display: Monochrome TV out; 24 lines × 32 characters or 64 × 48 block graphics mode
- Backward compatibility: ZX80
- Successor: NE-Z8000

The NE-Z80 was a homebuilt computer kit presented by Nova Eletrônica magazine on the October 1981 issue, a publication that was part of the Brazilian Prológica group.

It was the first Sinclair ZX80 clone available in Brazil. With an introduction price of Cr$ 59,900, it was the cheapest microcomputer on sale in the country at the time.

== Specifications ==
Specifications were similar to the original machine:

- CPU: Z80A @ 3.25 MHz
- Memory: ROM: 4 KiB; RAM: 1 KiB (extendable to 16 KiB)
- Keyboard: 40 keys membrane keyboard
- Display: 32 × 24 text; 64 × 48 semigraphics
- Expansion: 1 slot
- Outputs: 1 TV out (RF modulator, channel 2); cassette tape recorder audio in/out
- Storage: Cassette tape (300 baud)
