= CP-200 =

Brazilian home computer

CP 200
- CP 200 Modelo I
- Manufacturer: Prológica
- Type: Home computer
- Released: 1982; 44 years ago
- Discontinued: 1985; 41 years ago
- Operating system: Sinclair BASIC
- CPU: Zilog Z80A @ 3.25 MHz
- Memory: 16 KiB
- Display: PAL-M RF out; 32 x 22 text and 64 x 44 semigraphics
- Backward compatibility: Sinclair ZX-81
- Related: CP 200 Modelo II, CP 200 S

The CP 200 was a Brazilian home computer produced by Prológica in 1982.

It was compatible in software and hardware with the British Sinclair ZX81, although it was a less literal copy than the competing machines (TK82C and TK83), produced by Microdigital. There were two models of CP 200 with very similar cabinets, but "Modelo I" had the Prológica logo in high relief while "Modelo II" had a logo plate in the same position and was slightly larger.

Prológica later redesigned the cabinet, added a video monitor output, external power supply, and relaunched the product as CP 200 S.

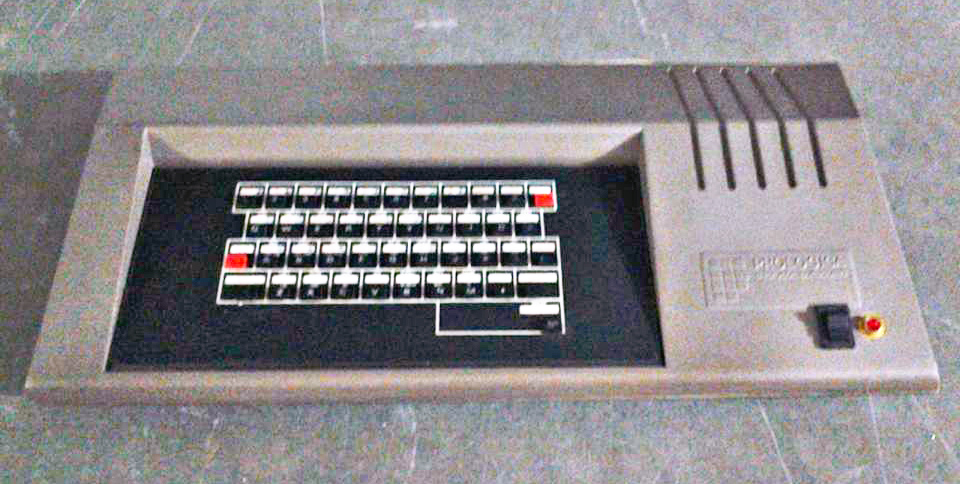
CP 200 Modelo I

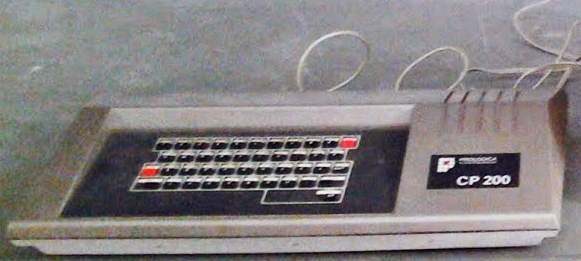
CP 200 Modelo II

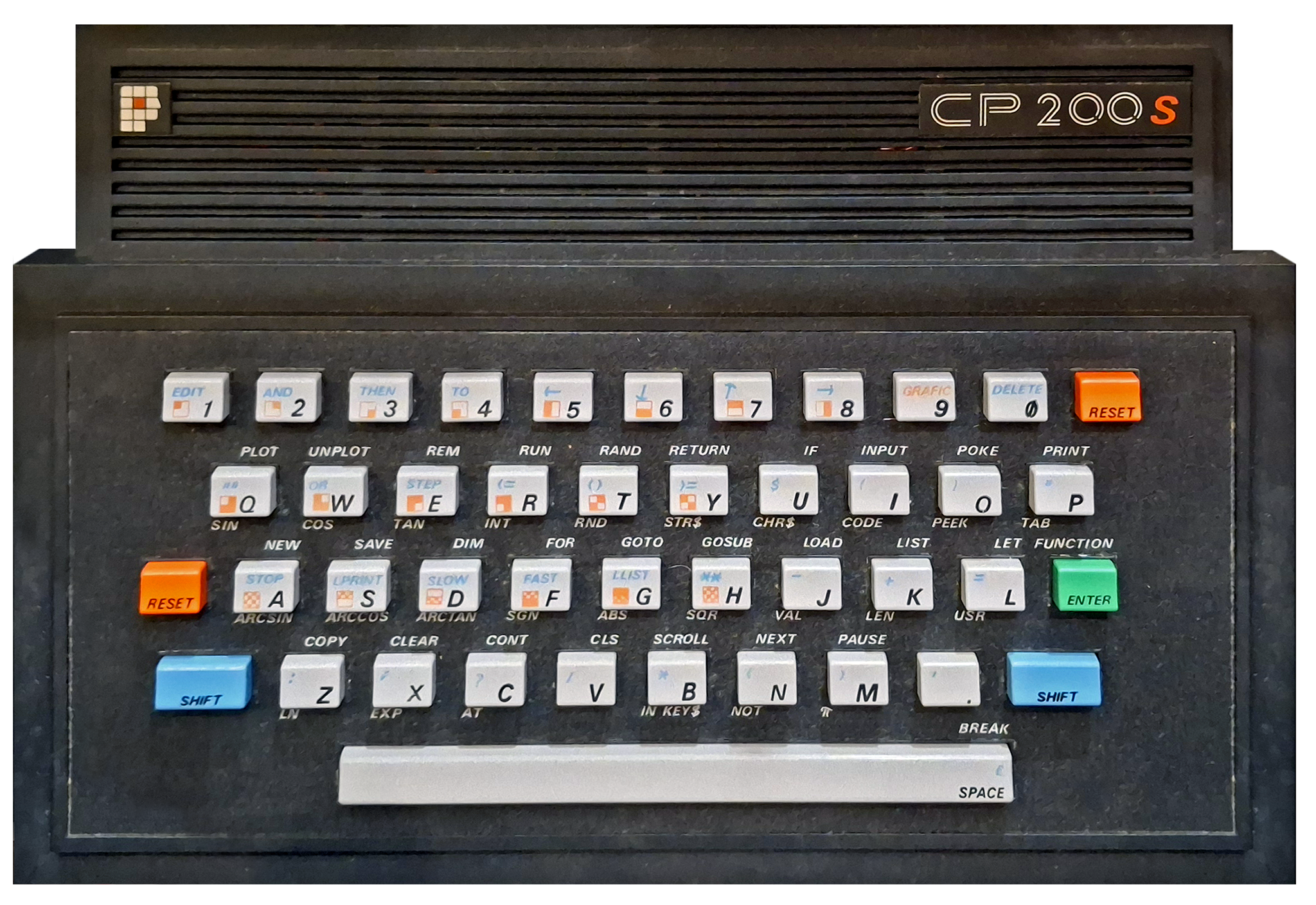
CP 200 S

== Technical details ==
The memory configuration consisted of 8 KiB of ROM and 16 KiB of RAM. The RAM was not expandable internally.

The keyboard was a simplified mechanical keyboard resembling a calculator. It featured 43 keys, including two red RESET keys that, when simultaneously pressed, initiated a reset of the machine. There was auditory feedback in the form of a "beep" sound whenever a key was pressed.

In terms of display, the CP 200 offered two modes. The first mode was a 32 x 22 character display, with text appearing in "inverse video" - white text on a black background. The second mode was a 64 x 44 semigraphic display, allowing for a more visually versatile output.

As for expansion capabilities, the machine provided a single 50-pin slot, positioned on the side of the system on the CP 200 and at the back on the CP 200 S.

The CP200 also featured ports for external connections.There was an RF TV out (PAL-M, channel 3), a joystick port and cassette tape port supporting speeds of 500 and 1500 baud. A composite monitor out (3-pin DIN connector) was available on the CP200 S variant.

== Bibliography ==
- Hurley, Linda. Programas para jovens programadores: TK82-83-85 CP200. São Paulo: McGraw-Hill, 1984.
