= NE-Z8000 =

Brazilian homebuilt computer clone of the Sinclair ZX81, introduced in late 1982

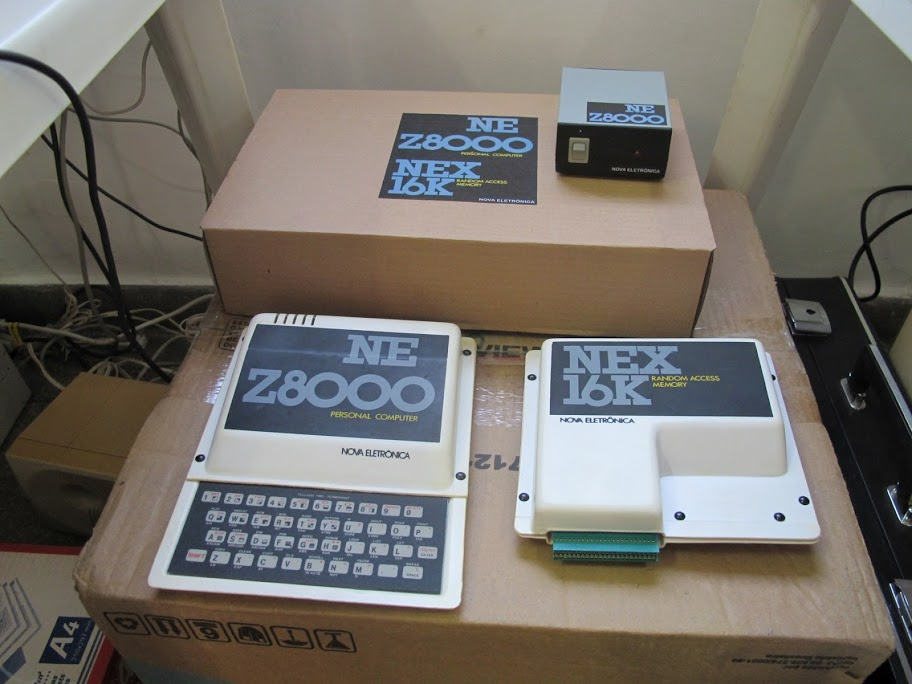
- NE-Z8000 with 16 Kb memory expansion
- Developer: Nova Eletrônica
- Manufacturer: Prológica
- Type: Microcomputer
- Released: 1982; 44 years ago
- Operating system: Sinclair BASIC
- CPU: Zilog Z80A @ 3.6 MHz
- Memory: 1 KB RAM 8 KB ROM
- Storage: External Compact Cassette recorder, 300 Baud
- Display: RF modulator monochrome video out; 24 lines × 32 characters, 64 × 48 semigraphics
- Power: 9V DC
- Backward compatibility: Sinclair ZX81
- Predecessor: NE-Z80

The NE-Z8000 is a Brazilian homebuilt computer clone of the Sinclair ZX81, introduced in late 1982 by Prológica's subsidiary, the monthly magazine Nova Eletrônica.

== General Information ==
The NE-Z8000 computer is based around a Z80A CPU clocked at 3.6 MHz with 1KB of RAM (expandable to 16 KB). The 8KB ROM comes with a built-in Sinclair BASIC interpreter.

The machine has four plugs on the back (9V DC, EAR, MIC and TV), and an exposed part of the circuit board where you can connect extra equipment.

The video connector cable is about 120 cm long and connects the TV plug to a regular PAL-M television, outputting a monochrome image on VHF channel 2 or 3. The EAR and MIC plugs allow to connect a cassette tape recorder for data storage, supporting a rate of 300 Baud.

It has no switch; to turn it on, you simply plug it into the power supply. A power supply provides 9V DC power usable by the machine.

The NE-Z8000 is considered rare, and in 2013 it could be auctioned by as much as R$1000.

== Bibliography ==
- Nova Eletrônica. São Paulo: Editele, 1982, Edição Nº 70, pp. 122.
