= AS-1000 =

Brazilian Sinclair ZX81 clone

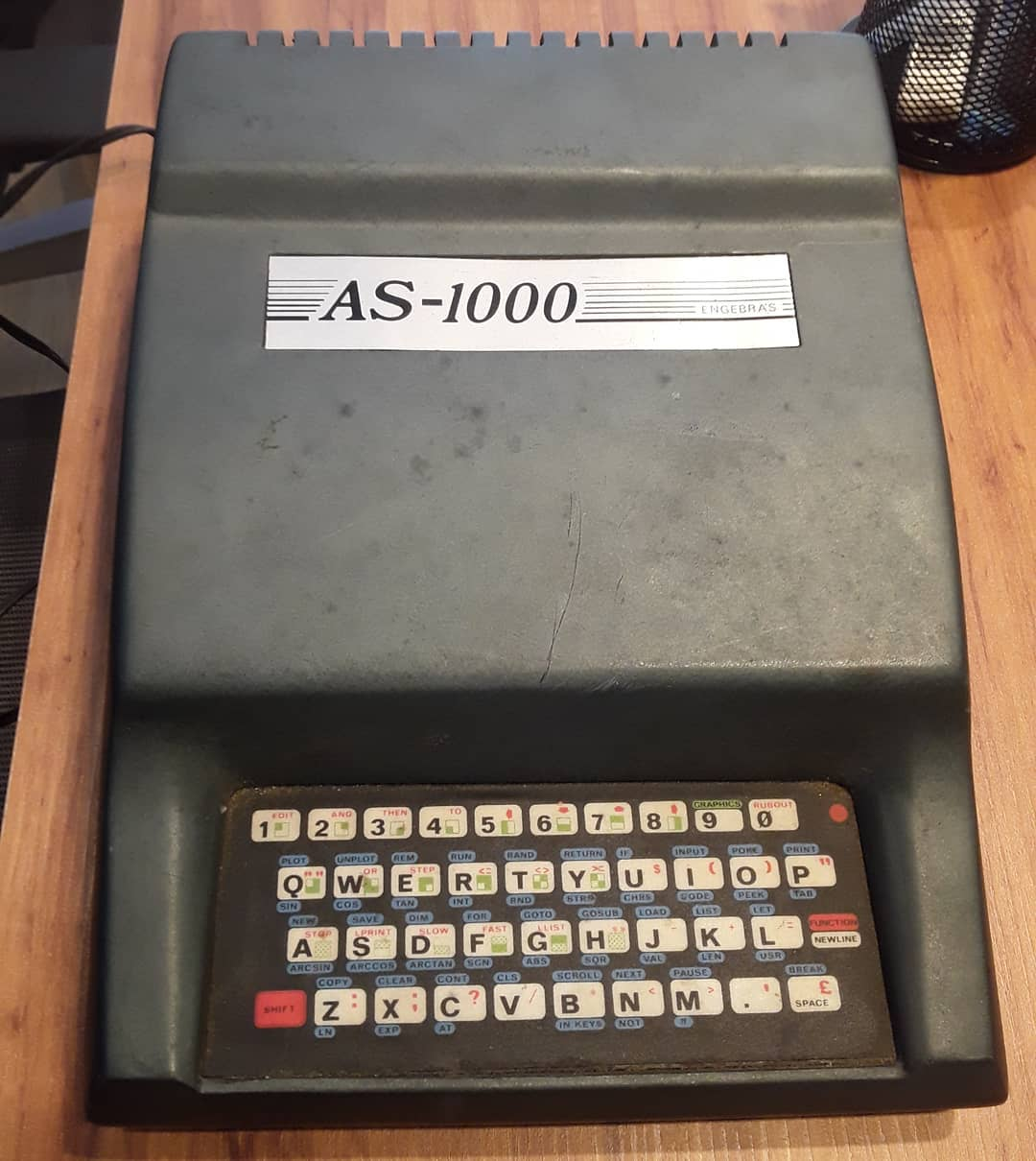
- Manufacturer: Engebrás Eletrônica e Informática Ltda
- Type: Home computer
- Released: October 1983; 42 years ago
- Introductory price: Cr$ 195 000
- Operating system: Sinclair BASIC
- CPU: Z80 at 3.25 MHz
- Memory: 16 KB (64 KB max.)
- Display: Monochrome display on television; 24 lines × 32 characters; 64 × 48 pixels semigraphics mode
- Backward compatibility: ZX81

The AS-1000 was a Brazilian clone of the Sinclair ZX81 introduced by Engebrás Eletrônica e Informática Ltda in October 1983. The main differences regarding the ZX81 are the internal power supply and larger RAM. The machine had an initial retail price of Cr$ 195 000.

The computer came with 16 KB of RAM, but could be fitted with 32 or 48. There were 8KB of ROM and a 40-key membrane keyboard. A regular TV set was used as monitor, with the computer displaying 32 x 22 text characters in monochrome. By using semigraphic characters, it was possible to simulate a 64 x 44 resolution display.

There was one expansion slot at the back of the machine, with the TV RF-out, audio in/out and joystick ports located at the side. Storage was by means of audio cassette, with a data transfer speed of 300 bauds.
