= Ringo R470 =

Brazilian Sinclair ZX81 clone

Ringo R-470
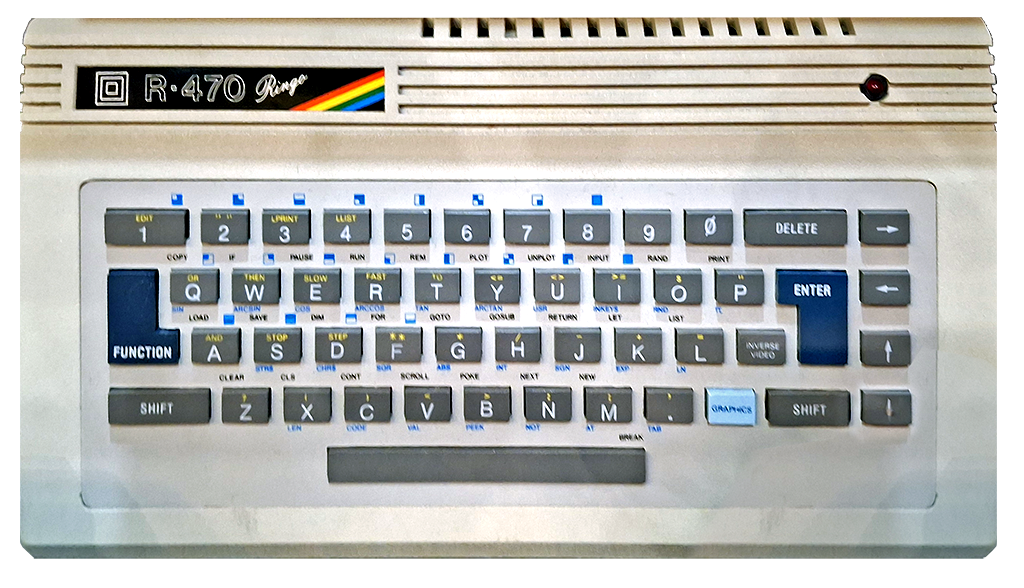
- Developer: Ritas do Brasil Ltda
- Type: Home computer
- Released: 1983; 43 years ago
- Introductory price: Cr$ 449,950.00
- Operating system: 8K Sinclair BASIC
- CPU: Z80 @ 3.25 MHz
- Memory: 16 KB
- Removable storage: Audio cassette, 300/2400 bit/s
- Display: Monochrome TV; 32 x 24 characters, 64 x 48 using semigraphic symbols
- Controller input: Joystick
- Connectivity: connector port for a 1200 bit/s modem

Ringo R-470 was a Brazilian clone of the Sinclair ZX81 by Ritas do Brasil Ltda. introduced in 1983. It featured a Z80A processor at 3.25 MHz, 8K ROM and 16 KB RAM. It wasn't 100% compatible with the ZX81, and some BASIC tokens have alternate codings.

It had a connector port for a 1200 bit/s modem and a joystick, and supported data storage using an external cassette recorder at 300 and 2400 bit/s.

There was an option to display "inverted video" (white background with black characters) by pressing INVERSE VIDEO. The computer also featured separate arrow keys.

The machine had a price of Cr$449,950, higher than competitor computers like the TK85 costing Cr$369,850, and it was not successful.

This computer can be emulated on modern systems under EightyOne Sinclair Emulator or MAME.

== Keywords and symbols ==
BASIC keywords and character mapping are slightly altered on Ringo R-470 compared to the ZX81. Entry is still accomplished per keyword token, obtained using different cursor modes and key combinations, but these are different from the ZX81. The following table shows the supported BASIC keyword tokens and symbols, and the key combinations needed to enter them.

BASIC Keyword or Symbol	Entered using
“	Left Shift + P
“”	Left Shift + 2
$	Left Shift + O
(	Left Shift + X
(edit mode)	Left Shift + 1
(graphics mode)	Left Shift + 9
)	Left Shift + C
*	Left Shift + G
**	Left Shift + F
+	Left Shift + K
–	Left Shift + J
/	Left Shift + H
:	Left Shift + N
;	Left Shift + M
<	Left Shift + V
<=	Left Shift + Y
<>	Left Shift + U
=	Left Shift + L
>	Left Shift + B
>=	Left Shift + I
?	Left Shift + Z
ABS	Left Control then G
ACS	Left Control then R
AND	Left Shift + A
ARCTAN	Left Control then Y
ASN	Left Control then W
AT	Left Control then M
CHR$	Left Control then D
CLEAR	Z
CLS	X
CODE	Left Control then C
CONT	C
COPY	Q
COS	Left Control then E
DIM	D
EXP	Left Control then K
FAST	Left Shift + R
FOR	F
GOSUB	H
GOTO	G
IF	W
INKEY$	Left Control then I
INPUT	I
INT	Left Control then H
LEN	Left Control then X
LET	K
LIST	L
LLIST	Left Shift + 4
LN	Left Control then L
LOAD	A
LPRINT	Left Shift + 3
NEW	M
NEXT	N
NOT	Left Control then N
OR	Left Shift + Q
PAUSE	E
PEEK	Left Control then B
PLOT	Y
POKE	B
PRINT	P
RAND	O
REM	T
RETURN	J
RND	Left Control then O
RUN	R
SAVE	S
SCROLL	V
SGN	Left Control then J
SIN	Left Control then Q
SLOW	Left Shift + E
SQR	Left Control then F
STEP	Left Shift + D
STOP	Left Shift + S
STR$	Left Control then S
TAB	Left Control then ,
TAN	Left Control then T
THEN	Left Shift + W
TO	Left Shift + T
UNPLOT	U
USR	Left Control then U
VAL	Left Control then V
π	Left Control then P
