= TK83 =

ZX81 clone made by Microdigital Eletrônica in 1983

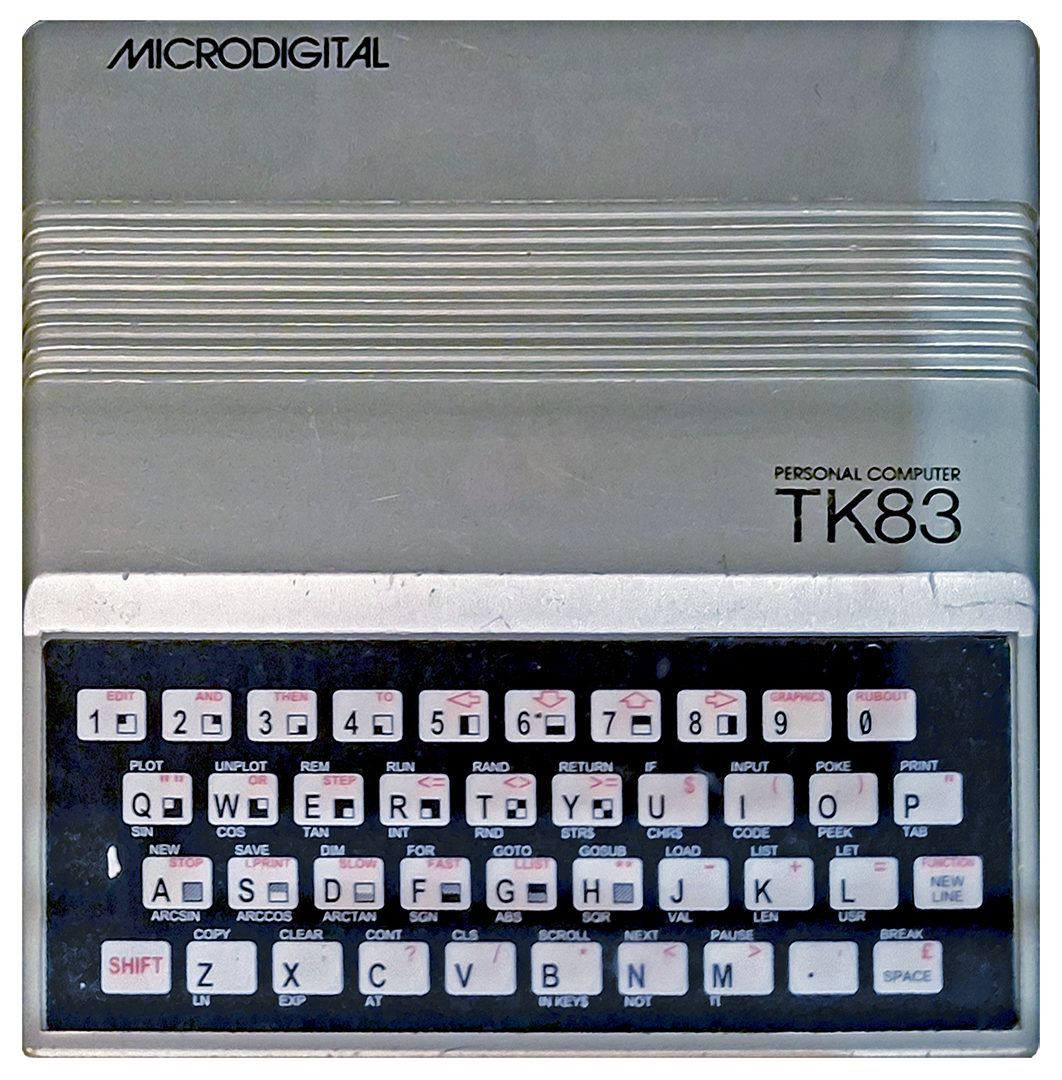
- Developer: Microdigital Eletrônica
- Manufacturer: Microdigital Eletrônica
- Type: Home computer
- Released: August 1982; 43 years ago
- Operating system: 8K Sinclair BASIC
- CPU: Z80A @ 3.25 MHz
- Memory: 2 KB RAM and 8 KB of ROM
- Removable storage: External Compact Cassette recorder at 300 bps
- Display: Monochrome display on television; 24 lines × 32 characters or 64 × 48 pixels graphics mode
- Graphics: TTL integrated circuits
- Power: 9V DC
- Backward compatibility: ZX81
- Predecessor: TK82C
- Successor: TK85

The TK83 was a home computer produced by the Brazilian company Microdigital Eletrônica Ltda. and introduced in August 1982. By December 1984, it was no longer being advertised by Microdigital, being discontinued in 1985.

The TK83 was a clone of the Sinclair ZX81, and can for all practical purposes, be considered a version of the TK82C with repagged memory and including the SLOW function which permitted the video be shown during processing.

== General information ==
The TK83 had the Zilog Z80A processor running at 3.25 MHz, 2 KB RAM (expandable to 64 KB) and 8 KB of ROM that included the BASIC interpreter.

The keyboard was made of layers of conductive (membrane) material and followed the Sinclair layout with 40 keys.

Video output was sent via a RF modulator to a TV set tuned at VHF channel 3, and featured black characters on a white background. The maximum resolution was 64 x 44 pixels, based on semigraphic characters useful for games and basic images (see ZX81 character set).

There was one expansion slot at the side of the machine, a cassette interface (data storage in tapes at 300 to 4200 baud, with audio cables were supplied with the computer for connection with a regular tape recorder) and a DIN joystick connector.
