= Desktop (word processor) =

Desktop is a WYSIWYG word processor for computers ZX Spectrum and compatible (e. g. Didaktik). It is a word processor of Czech origin, its author is Tomáš Vilím who used the name Universum as his author name. Distributor of the program was Proxima - Software.

Desktop is a very advanced word processor when compared with other ZX Spectrum word processors. It uses proportional fonts and it can use four different fonts in one document. However, it is not possible to use bold and italics as variants, every variant needs to use independent font.

The program was distributed with three supporting programs:

- Convertor - converter of text created in Tasword, D-Text, R-Text, D-Writer, and Textmachine into the Desktop format,
- Fonteditor - for editing fonts and writing headings, it can convert color images into grayscale images,
- Screen Top - for editing images up to dimensions of 512 by 384 pixels (2 by 2 screens of ZX Spectrum).

Several printers and plotters were supported for printing the text:

- plotter Minigraf Aritma 0507,
- plotters XY 4140, XY 4150, XY 4160,
- plotter Merkur Alfi,
- 1-pin dot matrix printer BT100,
- printer Gamacentrum 01,
- thermoprinter Robotron K6304,
- 9-pin dot matrix printers Epson FX, RX, LX, EX and compatible,
- 24-pin dot matrix printers Epson LQ and compatible.

The driver Ultra LQ was developed for better printing at Epson compatible printers; it prints the letters in the matrix of 16 by 24 points instead of original 8 by 12 points. The driver Ultra BT for better printing at BT100 printer existed too. These drivers were distributed as independent software packages.

Special version of Desktop with driver of D-100 printer existed, because D-100 was not compatible with Epson printers. Also a version supporting PRT 42G printer existed.

Four sets of supporting programs, drivers, fonts, images were developed and distributed under the names Klub uživatelů Desktopu 1 - 4 (in English Desktop user club 1 - 4).

Klub uživatelů Desktopu 1 contains the following:

- Archives - for printing of font look overview,
- driver BT100-552 - it allows printing of up to 552 point per line instead of standard 480 points per line (it requires modified printer BT100, unmodified can be damaged),
- Fonteditor - keypad - font editor directly runnable from Desktop word processor, controlled by keyboard,
- Fonteditor - Kempston - font editor directly runnable from Desktop word processor, controlled by Kempston joystick,
- Insert+Cat - it allows creating a text file from a diskette directory, similarly, it allows to make a list of files on cassette. Additionally, it allows to convert sequential .Q files into text file (.Q files are sequential files used by diskette units Didaktik 40 and Didaktik 80).
- Keyboard View - for printing of actual keyboard letter placement,
- Pulldown Menus - pull-down menus for Desktop,
- 20 fonts,
- 2 font complets - every complet contains four fonts,
- 3 big fonts,
- 60 images,
- 3 sample texts.

Klub uživatelů Desktopu 2 is the driver Ultra BT.

Klub uživatelů Desktopu 3 contains following:

- Art Studio - the utility for modifying images (it is not the graphics editor Art Studio of OCP),
- Block operations,
- Calculator - scientific calculator, the results can be inserted into text,
- Keywords - for faster inserting of repeating parts of text into text,
- Remaker - for simple operations with whole fonts, it does not allow operation with single characters,
- Telefony - a game runnable directly from program Desktop,
- 19 fonts,
- 8 big fonts,
- 2 sample text,
- 12 image sets (cliparts),
- 5 image fonts (for program Fonteditor),
- 2 big images (for program Screen Top).

Klub uživatelů Desktopu 4 are drivers Ultra LX and Ultra LQ.

The next supporting programs were distributed in a set Public 12 - pro Desktop (in English Public 12 - for Desktop):

- XY 4150 - the drivet that does not simulates 1-pin dot matrix printer, but draws the letters,
- Great Font - for use of Fonteditoru big fonts directly in Desktop,
- Chess 1 - for making chess positions and their inserting into text,
- Chess 2 - for making chess positions and their inserting into text,
- Tetris for Desktop - the Tetris game runnable directly from program Desktop.

All programs are now available to use for free.
