= Timex 2048 =

Timex 2048 may refer to either of the following two ZX Spectrum-variant computers:

- Timex Computer 2048 (TC 2048), a computer sold in Portugal and Poland
- Timex Sinclair 2048 (TS 2048), a prototype computer intended for sale in North America
