= Timex Sinclair 2050 =

Computer modem for Timex Sinclair computers

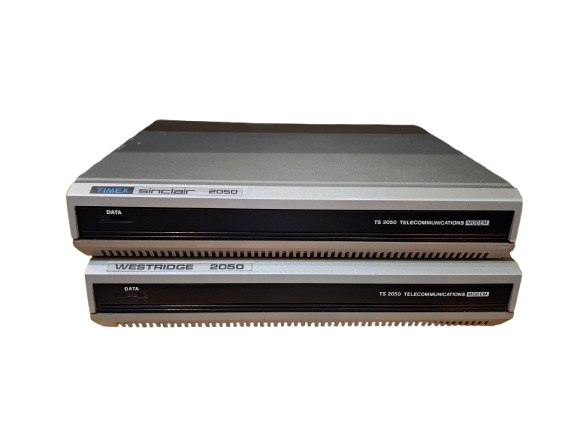
Timex Sinclair 2050 and Westridge 2050 computer modems

The Timex Sinclair 2050 (TS2050) was a computer modem built by Westridge Communications for Timex Sinclair, a joint venture between Sinclair Research and Timex Corporation.

Initially sold under the Timex Sinclair label and with a Timex designed case, it was then labeled Westridge 2050, as Timex exited the computer market when the modem started manufacture. A lot of people bought the modem board and made a custom casing.

The device supports all the Timex Sinclair machines, coming with a cassette containing modem control software for T/S 1000 and T/S 1500 on side A and for T/S 2068 on side B.

It was based on the Intel 8251 USART chip and very slow (300 bit/s). A magazine published a way to modify the modem to convert it to a serial port, allowing users to connect faster modems. At least two bulletin board systems based on the T/S 2068 computer and TS2050 modem existed as of 1988.
