= Timex Computer 3256 =

Unreleased 1987 home computer

- Type: Home computer
- Released: unreleased, development started in 1987
- Media: Cartridges, cassette tape, floppy discs
- Operating system: Sinclair BASIC / Timex Extended Basic / CP/M
- CPU: Zilog Z80A
- Memory: 256 KB
- Display: TV or video monitor; text: 32×24 lines, 16 colours; graphics: 256×192, 16 colours or 512×192 pixels, two colours; attributes: 32x24 or 32x192, two colours per area.
- Graphics: Timex SCLD
- Sound: Beeper, AY-3-8912
- Predecessor: Timex Sinclair 2068

The TC 3256 or Timex Computer 3256 was an unreleased computer which started development in 1987 by Timex of Portugal, a branch of Timex Corporation.

It was a third generation Sinclair ZX Spectrum compatible computer, with expanded capabilities and new TEC - Timex Extended Commands BASIC commands supporting the AY-3-8912 sound chip, RS-232 network and the 512x192 pixel high resolution graphic mode.

Besides the legacy Sinclair BASIC, the ROM included a word processor (Timeword), Timex Extended Basic (with support for the Tenet network, floppy disks and RAM drive) and a CP/M terminal emulator. RAM was expanded to 256kb.

At least one prototype was built, but the machine never reached the market due to Timex of Portugal shutting down its production line before its release.

== Technical specifications ==
CPU

- Zilog Z80A

ROM

- 64K
  - 16K Sinclair BASIC
  - 16K Timeword text processor
  - 16K Timex Extended Basic (Tenet, disk, RAM drive)
  - 16K CP/M terminal emulator

RAM

- 256K
  - 208K RAM drive
  - 48K base memory

Display

- Timex SCLD chip instead of the Spectrum's ULA, offering additional screen modes:
  - Text: 32×24 or 64x32 characters (8×8 pixels, rendered in graphics mode)
  - Graphics: 256×192 pixels, 15 colours (two simultaneous colours - "attributes" - per 8×8 pixels, causing attribute clash)
  - Extended Color: 256×192 pixels, 15 colors with colour resolution of 32×192 (two simultaneous colours - "attributes" - per 1×8 pixels)
  - Dual Screen: (two 256×192 pixels screens can be placed in memory)
  - A two color 512×192 mode

Sound

- Beeper (1 channel, 10 octaves and 10+ semitones via internal speaker)
- AY-3-8912

I/O

- RS-232
- Cartridge port
- Tape audio in/out for external cassette tape storage
- RF television out
- Composite video monitor out
- RGB monitor out
- Kempston Joystick input

Storage

- External cassette tape recorder
- Disk Drive: TOS / CP/M

Keyboard

- 69 keys with cursors, numpad and function keys

== See also ==
- Timex Sinclair
- Timex Sinclair 2068
