= Timex Computer 2048 =

1984 computer developed by Timex Portugal

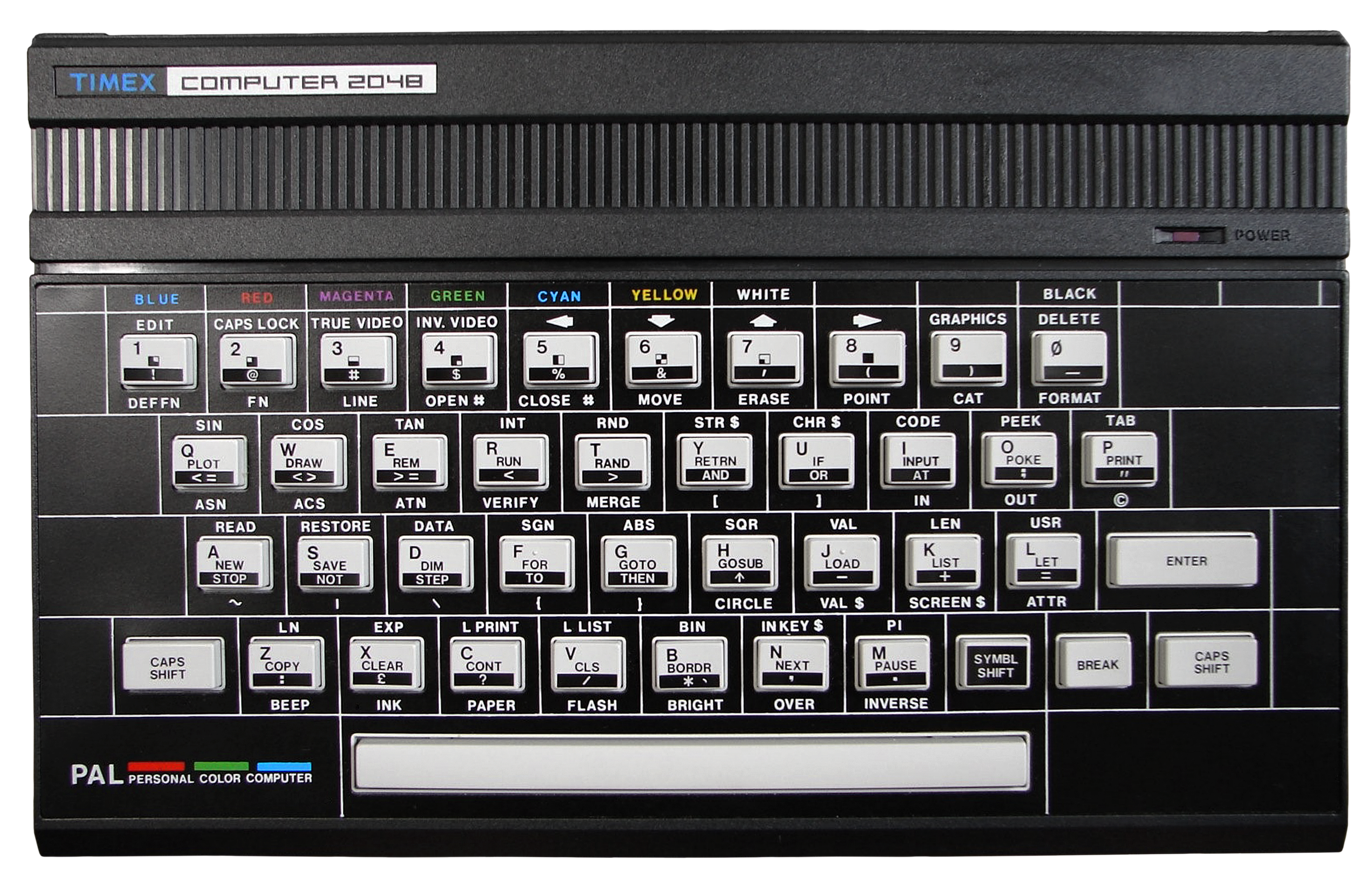
- Type: Home computer
- Released: 1984; 42 years ago
- Introductory price: PLZ 106,000
- Discontinued: 1989
- Operating system: Sinclair BASIC; TOS and CP/M with Timex FDD3000
- CPU: Zilog Z80A @ 3.5 MHz
- Memory: 48 KB
- Display: PAL TV or video monitor; text: 32×24 lines, 16 colours; graphics: 256×192, 16 colours or 512×192 pixels, two colours; attributes: 32x24 or 32x192, two colours per area.
- Graphics: Timex SCLD
- Sound: Beeper
- Backward compatibility: ZX Spectrum
- Predecessor: Timex Sinclair 2068
- Successor: Komputer 2086, Spectrum SE

The Timex Computer 2048 or TC 2048 is a 1984 computer developed by Timex Portugal (the Portuguese branch of Timex Corporation), at the time part of Timex Sinclair. It was based on the Timex Sinclair 2048 prototype (see below), with a similar redesign case, composite video output, Kempston joystick interface, and additional video modes, while being highly compatible with the Sinclair ZX Spectrum computer (although ROM differences prevented 100% compatibility).

After connecting an external disk drive, Timex FDD3000, the computer could work under TOS - Timex Operating System or CP/M.

As Timex Portugal sold the Timex Sinclair models in Portugal and Poland under the Timex Computer brand, this computer is named "Timex Computer 2048", even though the "Timex Sinclair 2048" was never produced.

== Timex Sinclair 2048 (prototype) ==
The Timex Sinclair 2048 was not released by Timex Sinclair because of the failure of the T/S 1500. According to an early Timex Sinclair 2000 computer flyer, it would be a cut-down Timex Sinclair 2068 with 16 KB of RAM. It had an added Kempston-compatible joystick interface and a monochrome high resolution mode for 80 column text.

== History ==
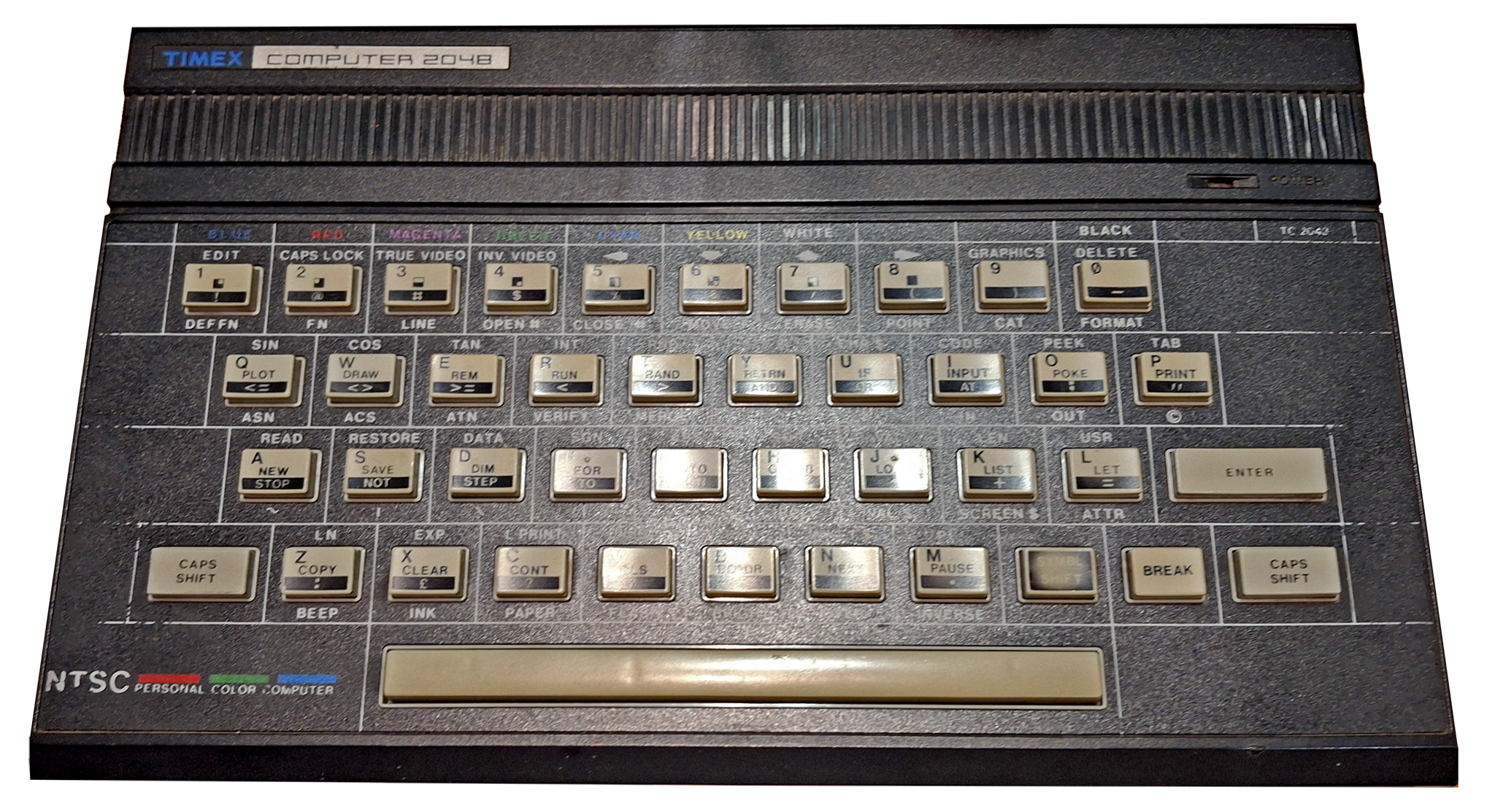
TC 2048 NTSC version

In contrast with the ZX Spectrum, which was the best-selling computer in Britain at the time, the T/S 2068 and T/S 1500 were considered failures. Timex Corporation withdrew from the U.S. home computer market in February 1984. Timex Portugal continued to manufacture and sell the TC 2048 in Portugal and Poland, where it was very successful, selling more than 10000 units. Also, a NTSC version was sold in Chile.

TC 2048 started to be sold in Poland in 1986, with 5000 units available at the "Central Scouting Store" for a price of PLZ 106,000. It was the equivalent of 4 average salaries (24,095 PLZ), and slightly higher than a ZX Spectrum (PLZ 70,000-80,000).

Peripherals where also made available at the time of release:

Description	Price PLZ	Quantity
TIMEX 3″ diskdrive	250 000	1 500
TIMEX 50 Printer	96 000	700
TIMEX 1000 Printer	280 000	500
TIMEX 2020 cassette tape recorder	30 000	2000
"Quickshot" Joystick	8 500	3 500
3″ floppy disc	3 000	15 000

Production of the computer ended in 1989.

== Further developments ==
This computer forms the basis of a proposal for an improved Spectrum-compatible machine, the ZX Spectrum SE. Based on the Timex TC 2048 and the ZX Spectrum 128, with Timex graphic modes and 280K RAM, it was proposed by Andrew Owen and Jarek Adamski in 2000. A prototype was created and this configuration is supported by different emulators.

Two modifications of the TC 2048 exist: the TC 2128 (by STAVI) and the TC 2144 (by Jarek Adamski). Both extend the RAM to 128K and upgrade the ULA to use four screen areas.

== Technical specifications ==
CPU

- Zilog Z80A @ 3.50 MHz

ROM

- 16 KB

RAM

- 48 KB

Display

- Timex SCLD chip instead of the Spectrum's ULA, offering additional Extended Color, Dual Screen and High Resolution screen modes:
  - Text: 32×24 characters (8×8 pixels, rendered in graphics mode)
  - Graphics: 256×192 pixels, 15 colours (two simultaneous colours - "attributes" - per 8×8 pixels, causing attribute clash)
  - Extended Color: 256×192 pixels, 15 colors with colour resolution of 32×192 (two simultaneous colours - "attributes" - per 8x1 pixels)
  - Dual Screen: (two 256×192 pixels screens can be placed in memory)
  - High Resolution: 512×192 mode with 2 colours (Four palettes: Black & White, Blue & Yellow, Red & Cyan, Magenta & Green).
Timex additional screen modes

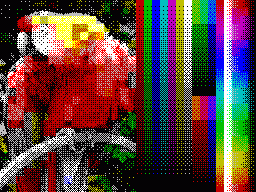
Standard Graphics 256x192 (8x8 attributes)

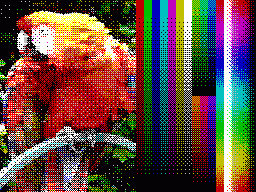
Extended Color 256x192 (8x1 attributes)

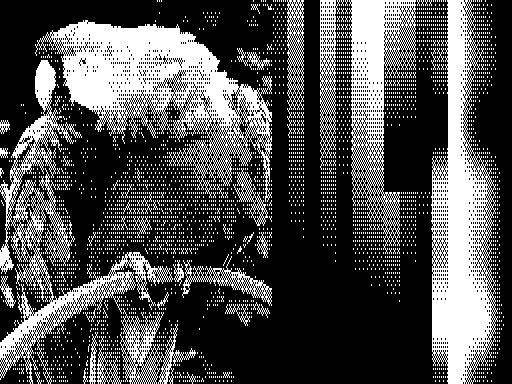
High Resolution 512x192 (Black & White palette)

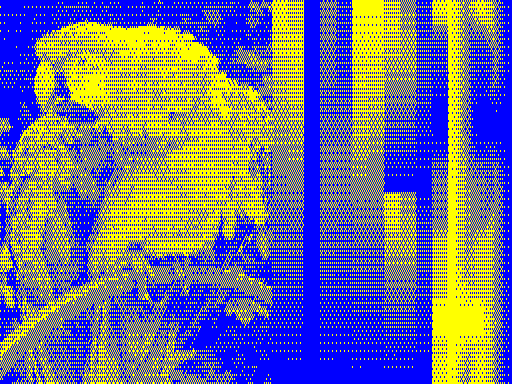
High Resolution 512x192 (Blue & Yellow palette)

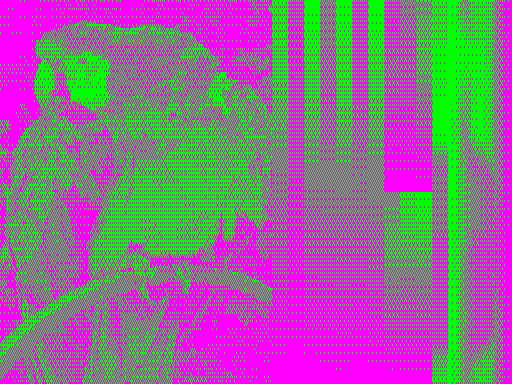
High Resolution 512x192 (Magenta & Green palette)

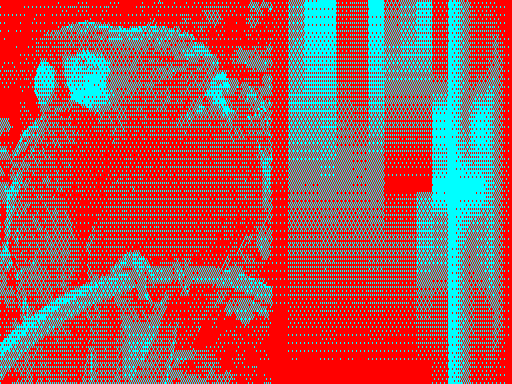
High Resolution 512x192 (Red & Cyan palette)

Sound

- Beeper (1 channel, 10 octaves and 10+ semitones via internal speaker) [By separate purchase the Joystick/Sound Unit was available to enhance sound and provide a joystick port.]

I/O

- Z80 bus in/out
- Line audio in/out for external cassette tape storage
- RF television out
- Composite video monitor out
- Kempston Joystick input

Storage

- External cassette tape recorder
- 1–8 external ZX Microdrives (using ZX Interface 1)
- Timex FDD (Floppy Disk Drive System Power Supply, Controller and Disk Drive in separate cases. 16K RAM, Timex Operating System (TOS))
- Timex FDD3000 (Enhanced version (all in one case) of the Timex FDD but upgraded to 64K RAM & TOS with two Hitachi 3″ disk drives)
Timex Storage devices

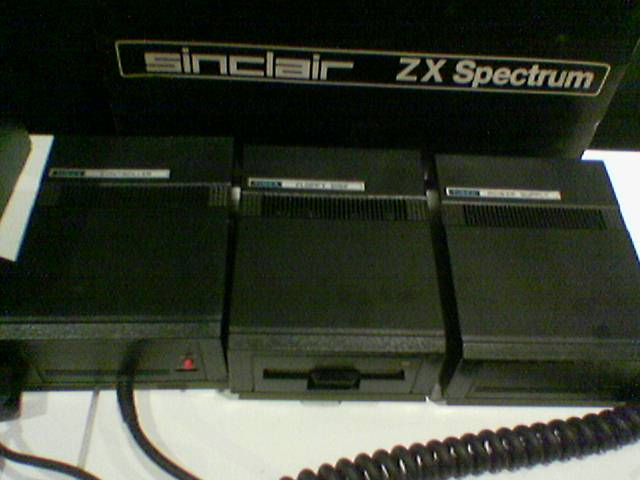
Timex FDD (left to right: Timex Controller, Timex Floppy Disk, Timex Power Supply).

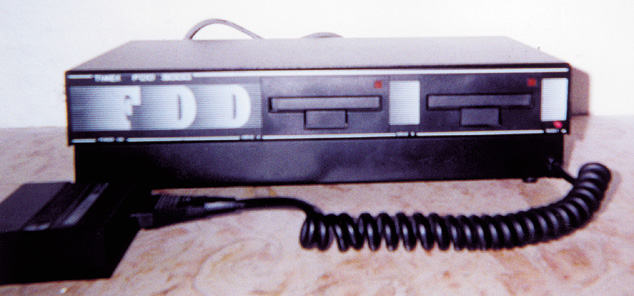
Front picture of a Timex FDD3000

== See also ==
- Timex Sinclair
- Timex Sinclair 2068
