= Edocr =

edocr
- Company type: Private
- Available in: English
- Founded: Manchester, UK
- Headquarters: Tampa, Florida, US
- Key people: Jack Berlin (CEO), Jim Bean (Chief of Staff)
- Services: Social reading and publishing platform
- Website: edocr.com
- Current status: Active

edocr is a digital library for e-book and documents and allows one to publish documents online and sell them on a marketplace.

Founded in 2007 by Manoj Ranaweera and headquartered in Manchester, UK, the company was self funded and quickly grew to an online repository with millions of documents. edocr was acquired by Tampa-based Accusoft in March 2015.

== History ==
Founding (2007–2016)

edocr began as a site to host and share documents. edocr allowed one to upload their documents and publish them online for easy sharing and access. The site was built to be easily accessible through multiple platforms such as iOS and Android and quickly became an online database of business documents.

Marketplace (2016–present)

After acquisition by Accusoft, an online marketplace was added to site allowing users to monetize their publications. edocr allows a variety of documents, books, short stories, academic papers, research reports, legal templates, business documents etc to be published and sold online. The publisher of documents can set the sale price for document and Accusoft charges a fee of $0.30 per transaction, plus 10% of the sales price set.

== Technology ==
edocr is based on Accusoft Prizm Doc technology which enables one to view documents online in a browser without using any additional plugins or active x controls. Prizm Doc allows documents to be viewed across different operating systems (Windows, Mac OS, and Linux) without conversion and all major document types including Word docs, PowerPoint presentations, PDFs, OpenDocument documents, OpenOffice.org XML documents etc are supported.
