= Fighter Pilot (1983 video game) =

1983 video game

- Developer: Dave Marshall
- Publisher: Digital Integration
- Platforms: ZX Spectrum, Commodore 64, Amstrad CPC, Atari 8-bit
- Release: 1983
- Genre: Combat flight simulator

Fighter Pilot is a combat flight simulator video game published by Digital Integration. It was released in 1983 for the ZX Spectrum and ported to the Commodore 64, Amstrad CPC, and Atari 8-bit computers. The game was designed by Dave Marshall.

== Gameplay ==
In Fighter Pilot, players control a McDonnell Douglas F-15 Eagle fighter aircraft equipped with two F100-PW-100 engines. The gameplay emphasizes realistic flight simulation, offering various training and combat scenarios.

There are multiple gameplay modes, including landing practice, flight training, combat scenarios, and blind landing exercises. During combat missions, players must intercept enemy aircraft attacking four ground bases, using radar and flight computer to locate enemy aircraft, determine their targets, and fly intercept vectors. Enemy fighters lock on to player aircraft within one mile range and 5000 feet altitude difference. Damage taken by player's aircraft is indicated on the radar with colour change of aircraft symbol. A total of four direct hits results in player's aircraft destruction. If players disengage from combat, enemies continue toward their destinations, potentially destroying airfields.

The cockpit interface presents a set of flight instruments. On the left, a radar compass helps locate enemy positions, displaying them as flashing dots. The flight computer assists in determining enemy altitude and aids in landing procedures. Players can also access a map of the area to check their position or the positions of enemy aircraft during combat. Other instruments include an artificial horizon displaying roll and pitch angles, an airspeed indicator, an altimeter, a vertical speed indicator showing climb rate, and a thrust indicator with afterburner indication. Additionally, the cockpit features an Instrument Landing System (ILS) for high-accuracy landings, a fuel gauge, and a navigation beacon system.

Players can adjust difficulty settings by adding crosswinds and turbulence, and select skill levels ranging from novice to ace.

=== Controls ===
The game offers multiple control schemes, including keyboard input and joystick support (Kempston, Sinclair, and AGF/Protek). Players control aircraft functions such as thrust, flaps, undercarriage, and weapons systems through dedicated keys or joystick movements.

== Graphics ==
The game uses a simple graphical representation with a blue sky and green ground. Runways are detailed with center lines, distance markers, and end lights, aiding in landing procedures.

== Development ==
Fighter Pilot was programmed in machine code to optimize performance on the ZX Spectrum hardware. Marshall's background in military aviation testing and simulation development contributed to the game's realistic flight model.

== Reception ==
Reception

Review scores
Publication	Score
Crash	86%
Computer and Video Games	32/40 (C64)
Your Computer	4/5

Fighter Pilot received generally positive reviews from gaming magazines upon release. Reviewers particularly praised its realism and comprehensive simulation aspects. Computer and Video Games described it as "an accurate simulation... of what it's like to fly one of these jets." Crash magazine described Fighter Pilot as "definitely the best simulation for the Spectrum yet, and one of the most exciting to play."

Your Computer commended the game's detailed cockpit instrumentation and convincing visual effects. Some mentioned that the controls required time to master, with Computer and Video Games specifically pointing out that it was "not one of those games you can load in and play immediately."

The graphics were generally well-received. Crash noted the high resolution graphics of both the visuals and instrument displays. Computer and Video Games reviewer, while praising the improved graphics and sound on the Commodore 64 version, felt that the instrument graphics could have been larger and criticized the inclusion of "dreadful" loading screen music.

Reviewers appreciated the overall speed of the game, though control responsiveness received mixed feedback, with Crash noting that key controls were "a fraction slow".
