= Desktop =

A desktop traditionally refers to:

- The surface of a desk (often to distinguish office appliances that fit on a desk, such as photocopiers and printers, from larger equipment covering its own area on the floor)

Desktop may refer to various computer terms:

- Desktop computer, a personal computer designed to fit on a desk
- Desktop metaphor, a style of graphical user interface modeled after a physical work surface
  - Desktop environment, software that provides a comprehensive computer user interface
  - .desktop file, providing configuration details for a program in a desktop environment
  - Remote desktop software, software that provides remote access to a computer's desktop
- Client (computing), sometimes referred to as a desktop to distinguish the client from a server
- Desktop (word processor), a program for the ZX Spectrum

== See also ==
- Laptop
