= Timex FDD3000 =

Disk drive peripheral for Timex Sinclair machines and CP/M computer.

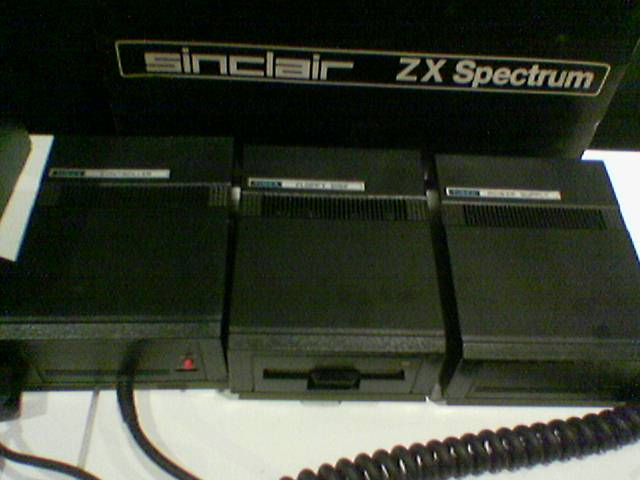
Timex FDD. The three boxes could be stacked up.

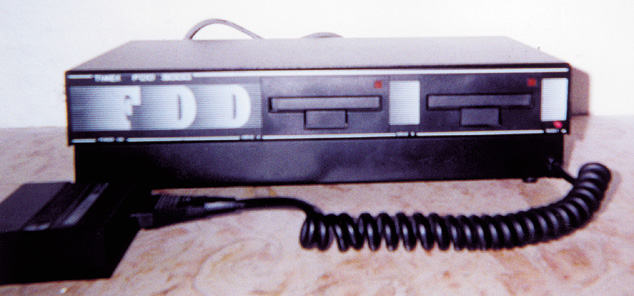
Timex FDD 3000

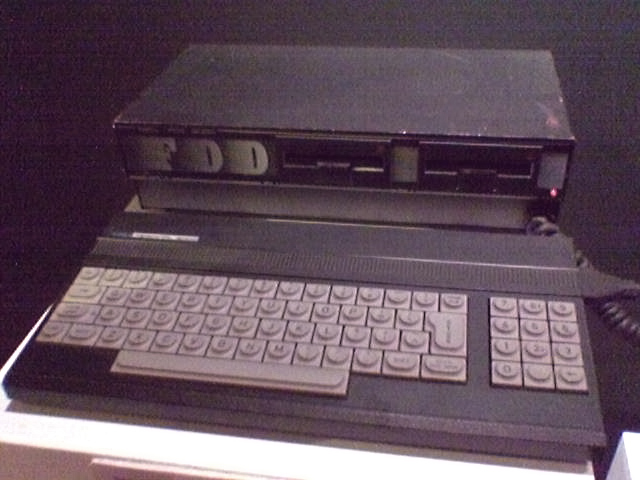
Timex FDD 3000 with Timex Terminal 3000 in the foreground

The Timex FDD 3000 in 1982 was a nearly complete computer by Timex of Portugal. It began its development at Timex Computer Corporation in the U.S., but it was at Timex of Portugal that the work was finished.

The Timex FDD 3000 is an upgraded Timex FDD (sometimes known as the FDD3 because it consisted of three separate boxes: a floppy-disk drive, the controller and the power supply). The Timex FDD3 was intended as a floppy disk peripheral for the Timex TC 2048 or TC 2068 microcomputers. It usually had 16K RAM and only one 3″ disk drive, but could be upgraded to 64K RAM and a second disk drive, making it capable of running CP/M. Since the controller is electrically compatible with today's disk drives, it is possible to connect a 3.5″/5.25″ disk drive to the Timex FDD3 Controller.

Later, Timex combined the three boxes of the FDD into one big box called the Timex FDD 3000. Timex also added 64K RAM, a second 3″ floppy disk drive and a line in the controller cable to pass the video signal generated by the Timex Terminal 3000 (TT 3000) to the back of FDD 3000 box.

== Timex FDD/FDD 3000 usage ==
The FDD/FDD 3000 can be used as a disk drive peripheral or as a CP/M computer.

- As a disk drive system running TOS (Timex Operating System) connected to a ZX Spectrum, TC 2048/2068 or T/S 2068 in Spectrum mode with a twister board for the rear bus connection.
- As a CP/M computer using a TC 2048/2068 running Timex Terminal Emulator or using a Timex Terminal 3000 and a composite video monitor as a console.
- The Timex FDD/FDD 3000 does not have a built-in operating system so a disk with the TOS is needed to boot it. Timex released TOS A.2 and CP/M. In Poland the TOS was modified and released as TOS A.4 and Jarek Adamski developed a new OS called ZXVGS. To use CP/M on the FDD 3000 without the TT 3000, a terminal emulator must be loaded on the computer (ZX Spectrum/TC 2048/TC 2068/TS 2068 in Spectrum mode) before CP/M will boot.

To use the FDD or FDD 3000 with a computer, an interface module is needed. It's called Timex Interface (TI) and contains the FDD/FDD 3000 initialization code in a ROM.
Because of the differences between the TC 2048 and the TC 2068 ROMs, there are two TI versions: an all-black version for ZX Spectrum & TC 2048 and a black with silver reset button for T/S & TC 2068. The TI TC 2048 version can be used with T/S & TC 2068 plus emulator cartridge (it has to be a "bootable" cartridge as you cannot type OUT 244,3 because the computer will crash).

Zebra Systems Inc. sold an all-silver TI. There is a TI ROM version that will work with ZX Spectrum 128.

== Clones ==
- Zebra Systems sold the Timex FDD as the "Zebra" FDD, in silver boxes to match the TS2068 (Timex FDD was sold in black boxes in Europe).
- Zebra Systems sold the Timex FDD 3000 as Zebra FDD 3000 in the US with the same box.
- Unipolbrit made some changes in the design of FDD, putting everything in only one box, but not the same as the FDD 3000.
- Some people in Poland replaced disk drive 3″ by a 5.25″ DS/DD (360K) drive with a manual switch to change the side to be read and name it FDD 6000, keeping most of the original FDD 3000 box. It is also possible to install a 3.5" disk drive (again with only minor modifications to the box) for use with 3.5" DD (double density) disks. These could be formatted to 640 kB using an undocumented variation of the FORMAT command with the letter 'd' added after the disk name (e.g. FORMAT * "b" TO "diskname"d)

== Timex FDD/FDD3000 specifications ==
- Z80 running at 4 MHz
- 16K RAM (64K RAM on the FDD 3000)
- 128 bytes ROM (boots system from floppy)
- WD1770 floppy disk controller
- WD2123 UART (2 serial ports)
