= Komputer 2086 =

Polish ZX Spectrum clone

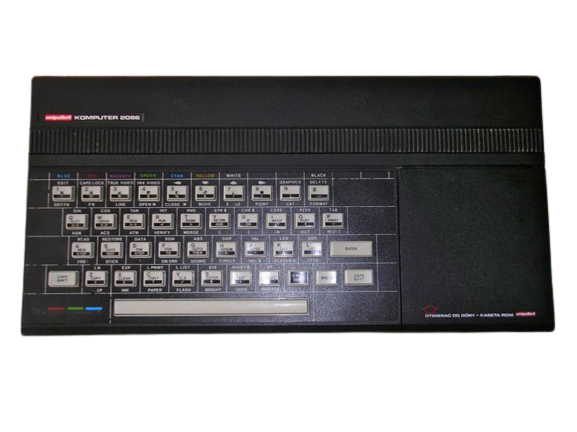
- Unipolbrit Komputer 2086
- Type: Home computer
- Released: 1986; 40 years ago
- Introductory price: 190000 zł
- Media: Cassette tapes, 3 1/2-inch floppy disks, 5 1/4-inch floppy disks, ROM Cartridges
- Operating system: Sinclair BASIC with Timex Computer Corp. extension
- CPU: Zilog Z80A @ 3.58 MHz
- Memory: 48 KiB
- Display: PAL TV or video monitor; text: 32×24 lines, 16 colours; graphics: 256×192, 16 colours or 512×192 pixels, two colours; attributes: 32x24 or 32x192, two colours per area.
- Graphics: Timex SCLD
- Sound: Beeper, AY-3-8912
- Input: Keyboard
- Predecessor: Timex Computer 2048
- Successor: Timex Computer 3256

The Unipolbrit Komputer 2086 was a Polish version of the home computer Timex Sinclair 2068, produced by a joint venture of the Polish state-owned Unimor and foreign company Polbrit International. Introduced in 1986, the computer had a cost of roughly 190000 zł.

The machine wasn't 100% ZX Spectrum-compatible (like all other Timex Sinclair computers) and a "Spectrum Emulation" cartridge was available (usually bundled).

== Technical specifications ==
CPU

- Zilog Z80A @ 3.50 MHz

ROM

- 16 KiB

RAM

- 48 KiB

Display

- Timex SCLD chip with Extended Color, Dual Screen and High Resolution screen modes:
  - Text: 32×24 characters (8×8 pixels, rendered in graphics mode)
  - Graphics: 256×192 pixels, 15 colours (two simultaneous colours - "attributes" - per 8×8 pixels, causing attribute clash)
  - Extended Color: 256×192 pixels, 15 colors with colour resolution of 32×192 (two simultaneous colours - "attributes" - per 8x1 pixels)
  - Dual Screen: (two 256×192 pixels screens can be placed in memory)
  - High Resolution: 512×192 mode with 2 colours (Four palettes: Black & White, Blue & Yellow, Red & Cyan, Magenta & Green).

Sound

- Beeper (1 channel, 10 octaves and 10+ semitones via internal speaker) and AY-3-8912 PSG (three channels)

I/O

- Line audio in/out for external cassette tape storage
- RF television out
- DIN Composite monitor out
- Kempston Joystick input
- Cartridge port
- Centronics printer port.

Storage

- External cassette tape recorder
- External 5" 1/4 or 3" disc drives

Keyboard

- Mechanical keyboard: 42 keys, five function keys, cursor keys

== Gallery ==
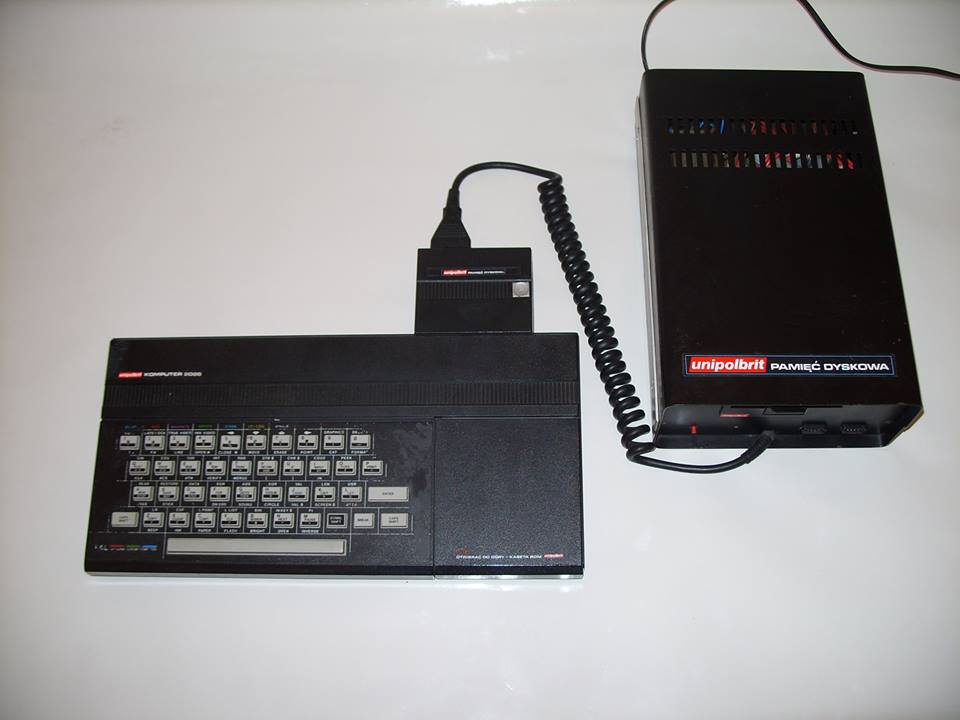
Unipolbrit with external disc drive

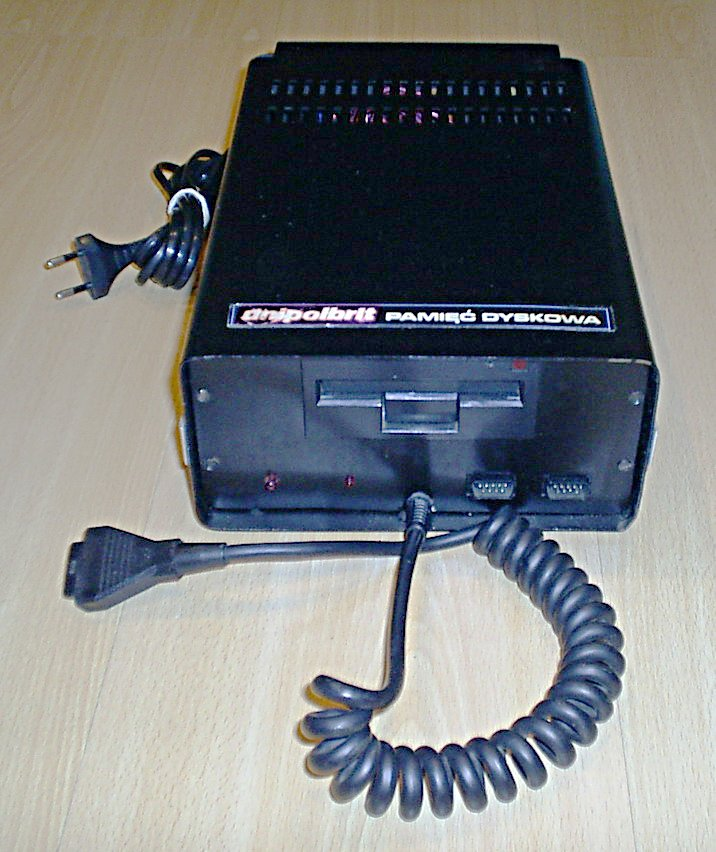
External 3" drive.

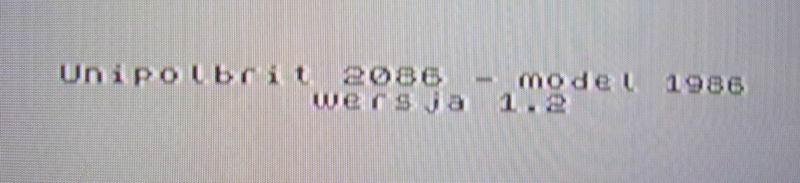
Unipolbrit boot screen

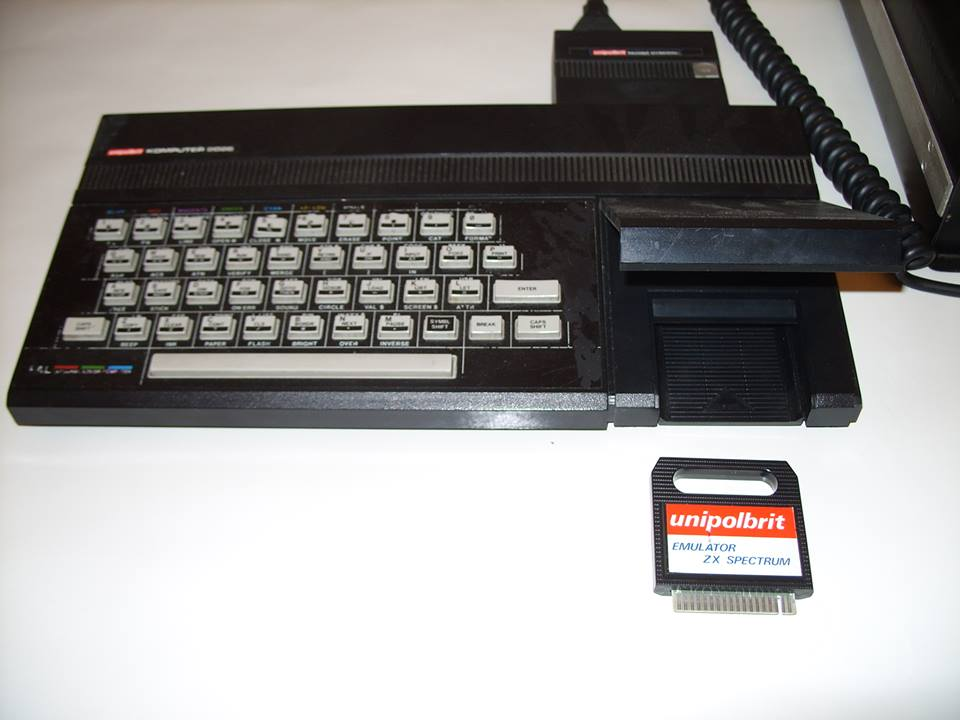
Unipolbrit with cartridge drive open

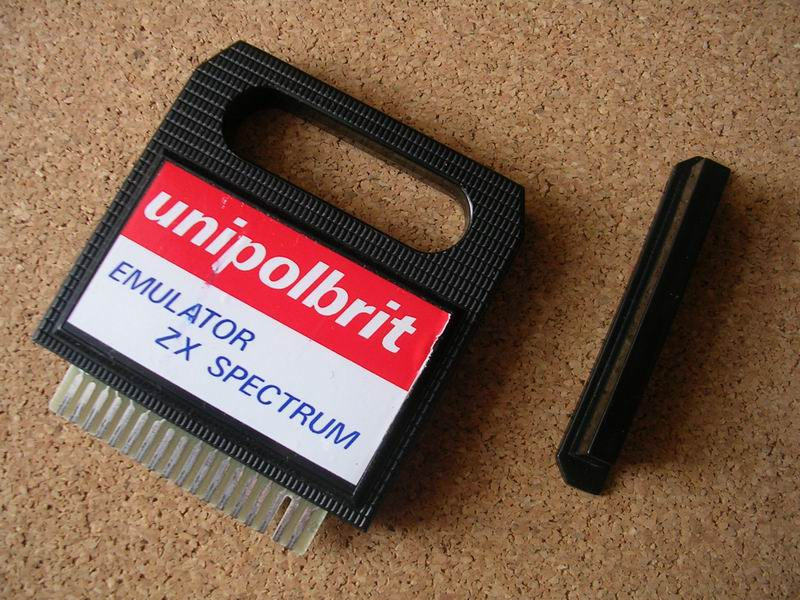
ZX Spectrum emulator cartridge

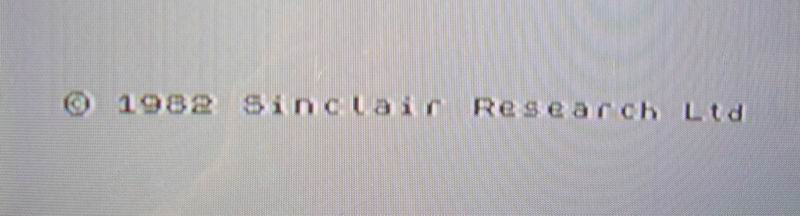
ZX Spectrum emulator cartridge boot screen

== See also ==
- Elwro 800 Junior
- Mera-Elzab Meritum
- Timex Sinclair 2068
