= Timex Sinclair =

Old joint venture between Timex and Sinclair

- Timex Sinclair wordmark
- Company type: Joint venture
- Industry: Home Computer
- Founded: December 12, 1982 (Timex Computer Corp.)
- Defunct: January 10, 1984 (Timex Computer Corp.)
- Fate: Dissolved
- Headquarters: Waterbury, Connecticut, United States
- Owners: Sinclair Research, Timex Corporation

Timex Sinclair was a joint venture established in December 1982 between the British company Sinclair Research and Timex Corporation in an effort to gain an entry into the rapidly growing early-1980s home computer market in North America.

== History ==
The choice of partnership was natural, as Timex was already the main contractor for manufacture of Sinclair's ZX81 and ZX Spectrum computers at its Scottish plant in Dundee.

Due to large demand another manufacturer was needed, so Timex Portugal (TMX Portugal Lda, a Portuguese Timex subsidiary), with skilled and relatively cheap labor force, took on the production of models to be exported to the U.S..

Timex Portugal sold the Timex Sinclair (ex: T/S 2068) models in Portugal and Poland under the Timex Computer (ex: TC 2068) brand. In order to market Timex Sinclair products in the United States, Timex Corporation created a subsidiary named "Timex Computer Corporation", and sold machines under the brand Timex Sinclair.

Timex Sinclair ended as Timex Corporation withdrew from the U.S. home computer market in January 1984 but Timex Portugal continued to manufacture, sell and develop hardware in Portugal and Poland for another ten years, with some machines also being sold in Canada and Argentina (see Czerweny computers). A 1986 report mentions that 800.000 systems, between TC 2048, TC 2068 and FDD3000, were sold to Poland.

Overall, Timex Sinclair machines were nowhere near as successful as their UK progenitors; in contrast with the ZX Spectrum, which was the best-selling computer in Britain at the time, the T/S 2068 was a relative failure, partly due to Timex Corporation leaving the computer business shortly after its introduction.

== Products ==
The T/S 1000 was introduced in July 1982, with Timex Sinclair touting it as the first home computer to cost under $100 in the U.S. market. In spite of the flaws in the early versions, 550,000 units were sold by the end of the year.

In 1983, about 100,000 units were sold in Canada, and 400,000 in the US, with the price dropping to $49.95. A new computer was announced in May. Named T/S 2000, it was based on the ZX Spectrum, and would come in with 16 or 48K RAM versions, costing $150 or $200. The 16K version was cancelled, and the 48K version was released as T/S 2068.

Two new computers were introduced that same year, the T/S 1500 and T/S 2068. Both were more expensive ($79 and $199 respectively) and with low sales.

=== Released computers ===
Timex Sinclair released four computers, all of them based (to some extent) on Sinclair Research's existing machines. In chronological order:

- T/S 1000, introduced in July 1982 and essentially a modified ZX81 with 2 KB RAM.
- T/S 1500, introduced in August 1983, it was a T/S 1000 with 16 KiB RAM and a ZX Spectrum-like case and keyboard.
- T/S 2068 (TC 2068), released in November 1983, was a ZX Spectrum-based machine with enhancements, namely a cartridge port to make it compete with video game consoles, which resulted in poor compatibility with software developed for the original. Based on the T/S 2000 prototype. It was marketed under the Timex Computer brand in Canada, Argentina, Portugal and Poland as TC 2068.
- TC 2048, released in 1984, was a ZX Spectrum-based machine with a T/S 2068-like keyboard. Based on the T/S 2000 prototype and featured improved compatibility with the ZX Spectrum. Only sold in Portugal and Poland under the Timex Computer brand.
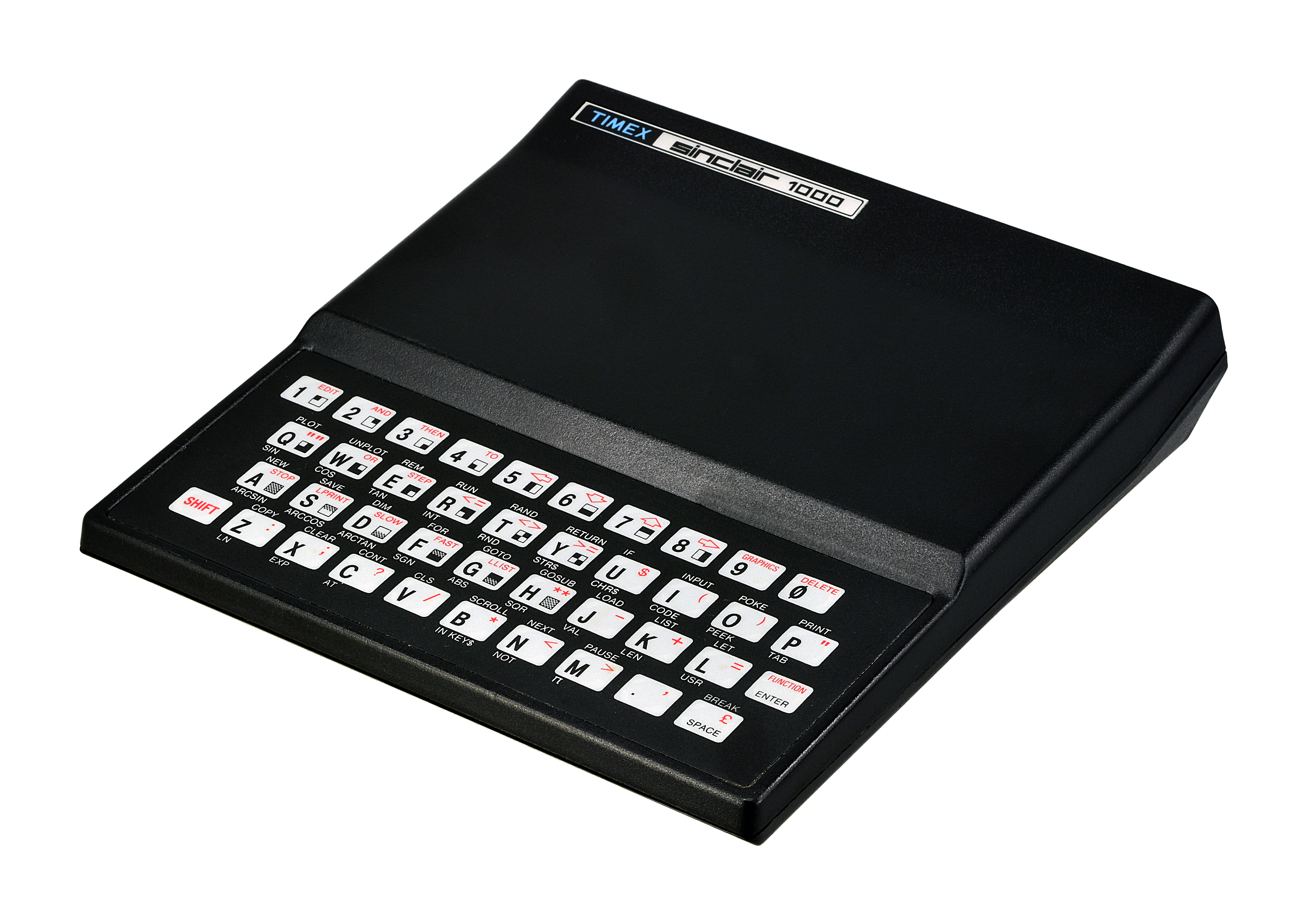
T/S 1000

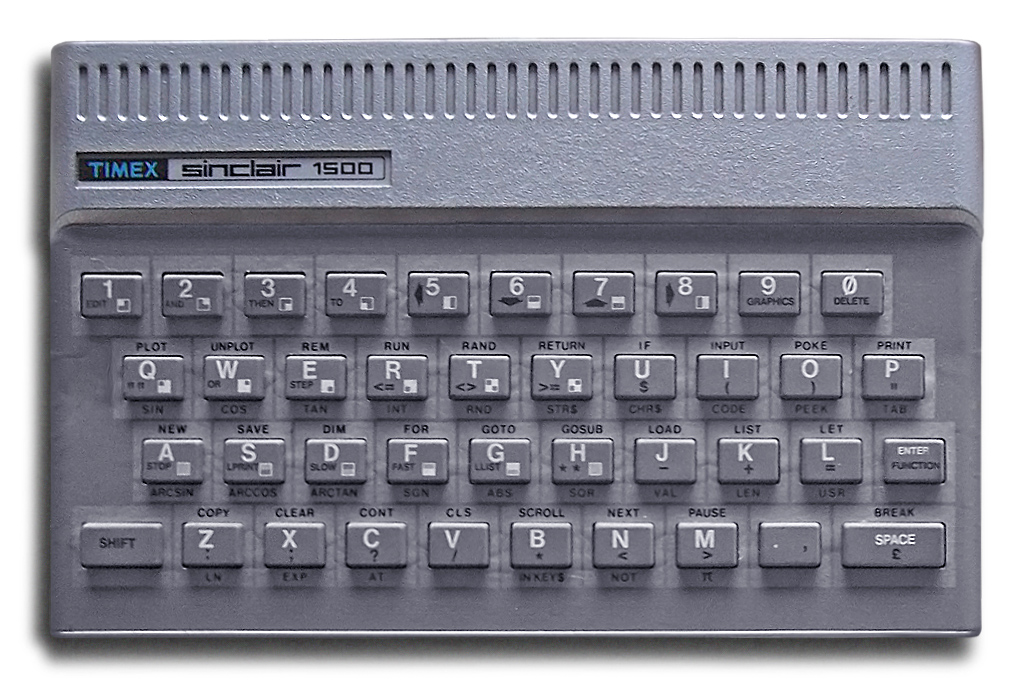
T/S 1500

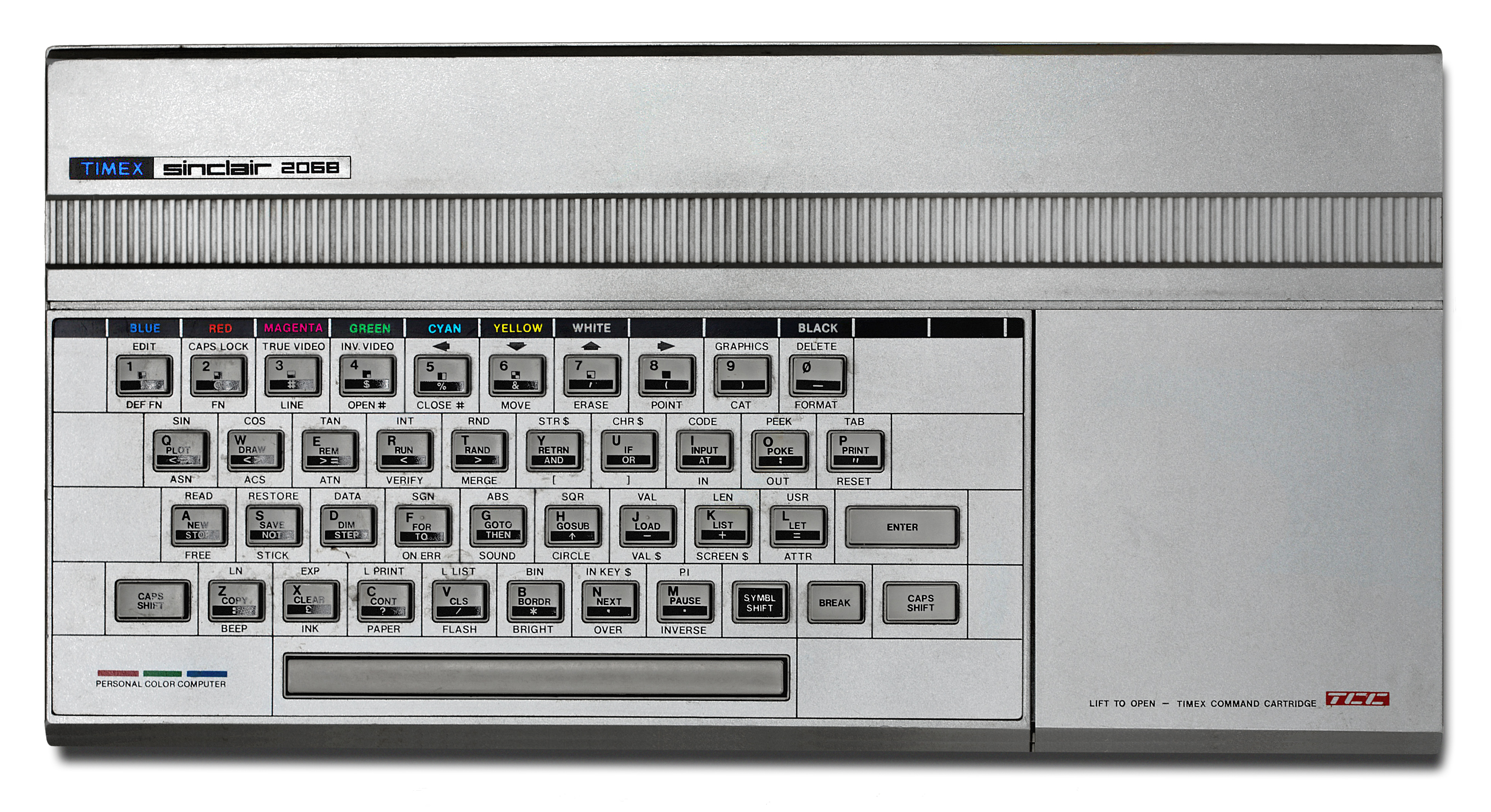
T/S 2068

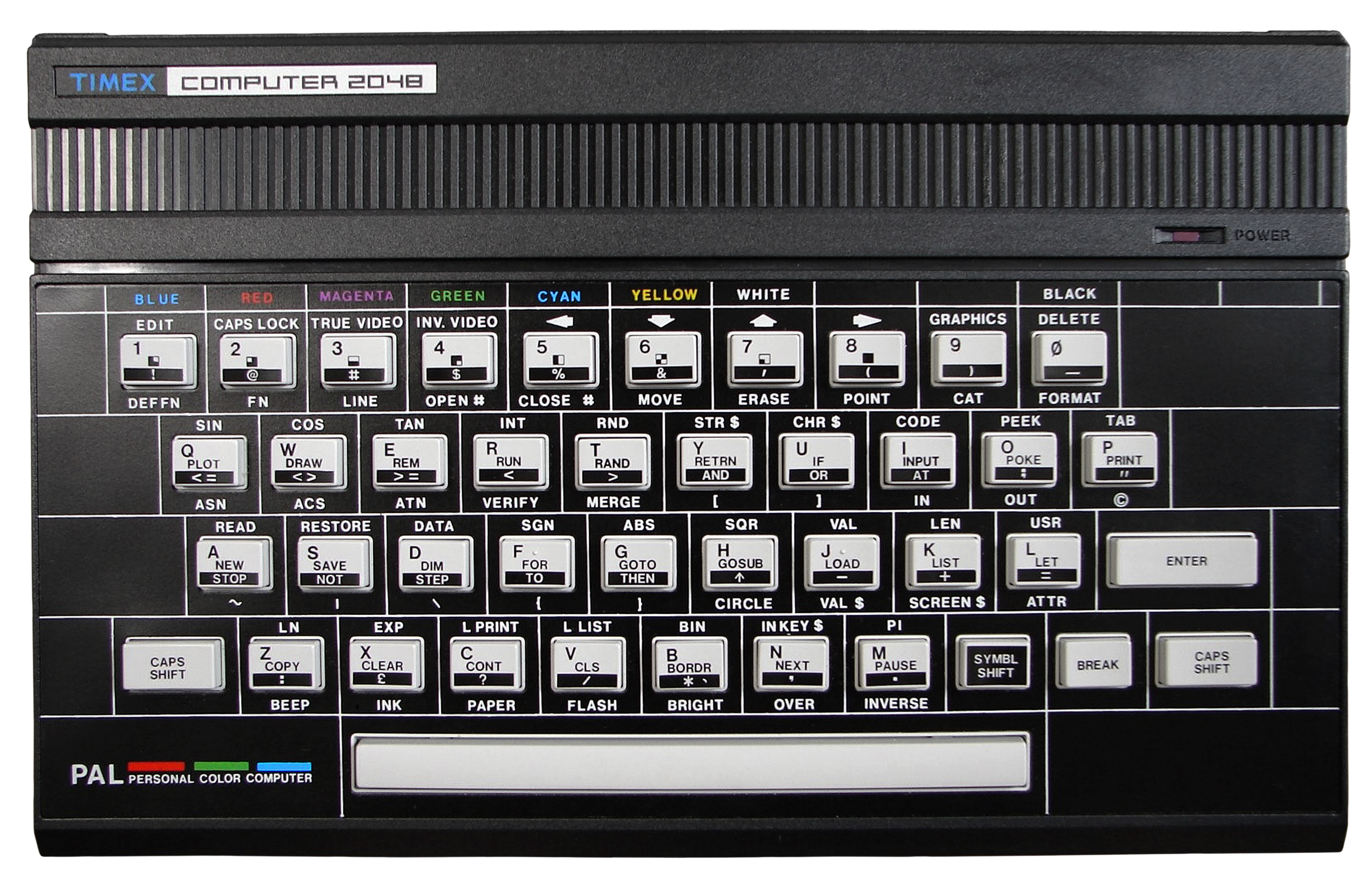
TC 2048

=== Hardware projects ===
- TC3256 was the next proposed computer. It was designed as the third generation of Timex Computer Technology, but it vanished when Timex Portugal shut down its production line.
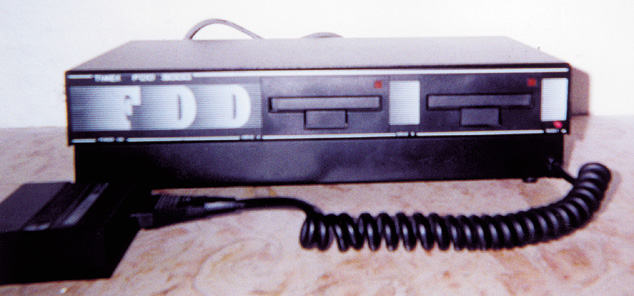
- Timex FDD3000
  Timex FDD or FDD 3000, a Z80-based CP/M-compatible computer. Most people only know it as a floppy disk drive controller but in fact, it is a computer without graphics circuitry. The FDD or FDD 3000 could be used in three different ways:
  - as a disk drive controller for a TC 2048 or T/S 2068 or ZX Spectrum, running TOS (Timex Operating System)
  - as a CP/M system, using a TC 2048 or T/S 2068 computer running the Timex Terminal Emulator as a console.
  - as a CP/M system, using the Timex Terminal 3000, a terminal keyboard, as a console.

== Peripherals ==
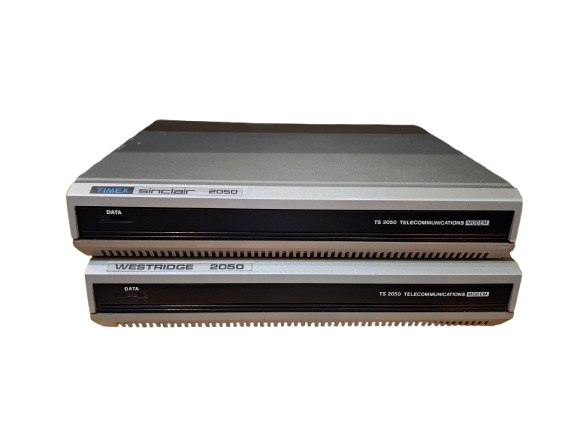
TS2050 computer modem

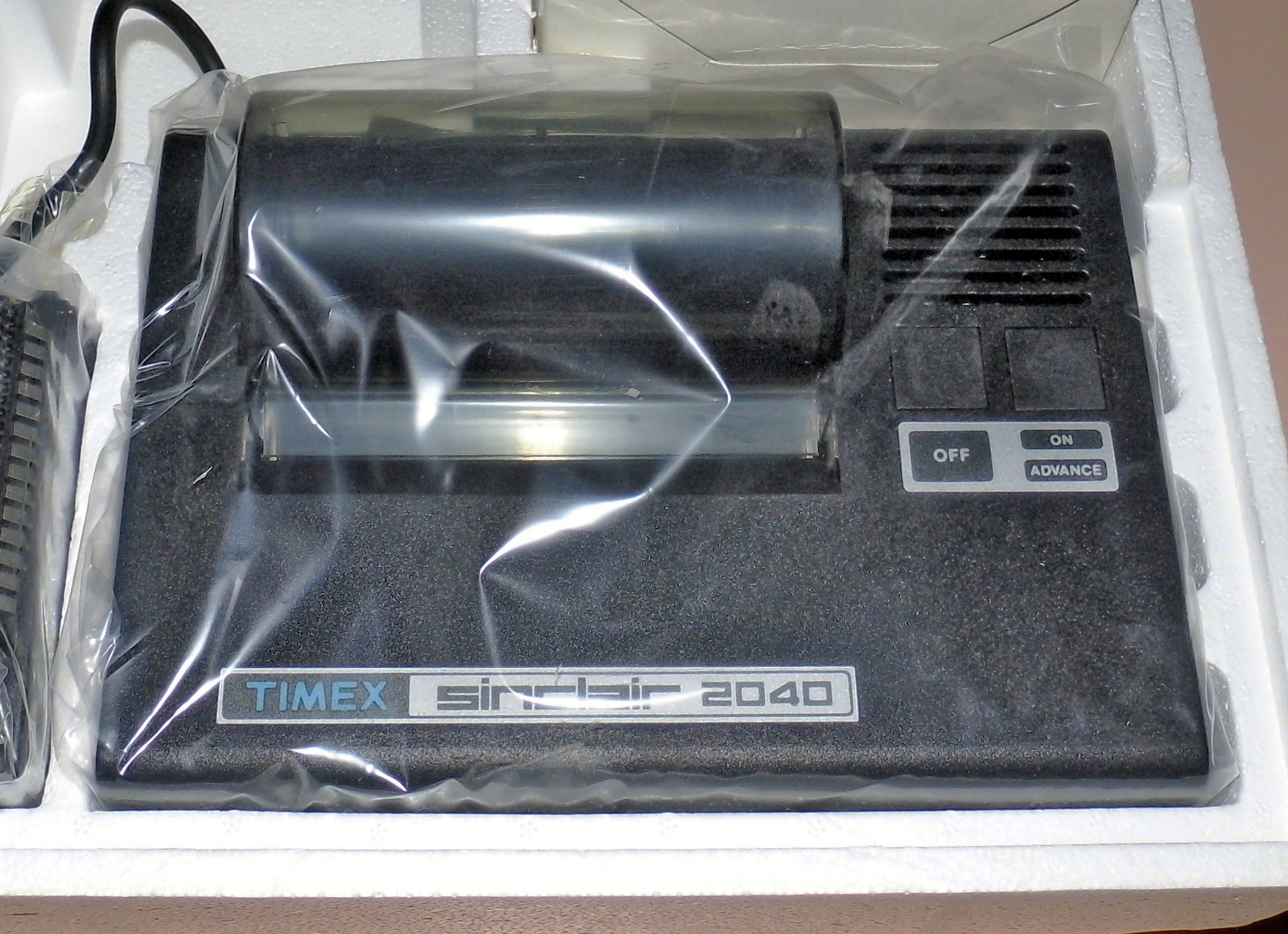
TS2040 Thermal Printer

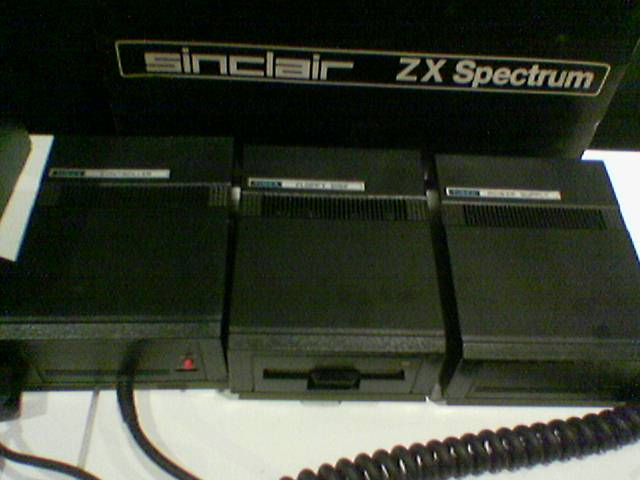
Timex FDD

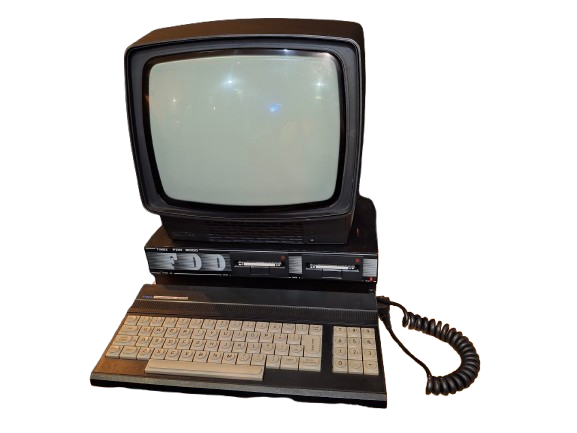
Timex Terminal 3000, FDD 3000, and Neptun 156 monitor

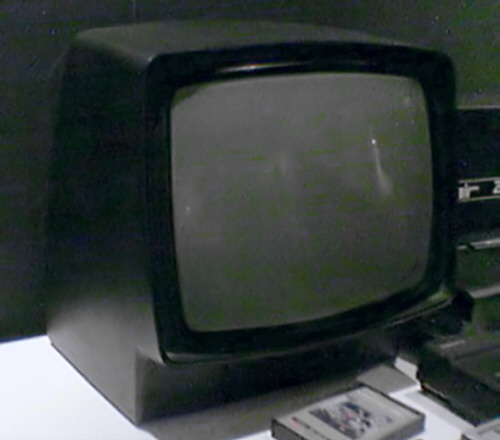
Neptun 156 monitor. It came in matching black or grey colours.

Timex Computer Corporation, under the Timex Sinclair brand, and Timex Portugal, under the Timex Computer brand, produced a number of different peripherals for the Timex computer line:

=== Timex Sinclair ===
- TS1016 - Timex 16K RAM Pack for use on a T/S 1000. Can be used on a T/S 1500.
- TS1050 - Not a real peripheral, but a "suitcase" to carry T/S 1000, tapes and peripherals
- TS1510 - A cartridge player for T/S 1500. It can be used on T/S 1000 with a 16K RAM Pack
- TS2020 - Analog tape recorder
- TS2040 - Thermal printer
- TP2040 - Thermal printer (badging variation, with "Printer" instead of "Sinclair")
- TS2050 - Communications modem
- TS2060 - Bus Expansion Unit (vaporware)
- TS2065 - Timex Microdrives (vaporware)
- TS2080 - 80-column dot matrix printer (vaporware)
- TS2090 - Command stick. Joystick to be used on T/S 2068 internal ports

=== Timex Computer ===
- TS1040 - A multi-voltage power supply (printer + tape recorder (T/S 2020) + T/S 1000 + TC 2048 or T/S 2068)
- TC2010 - A digital tape recorder
- TC2080 - A serial 80-column dot matrix printer
- Timex FDD - A "cut down" computer that can be used as a floppy disk controller
- Timex FDD3000 - A "cut down" computer that can be used as a floppy disk controller (an upgraded Timex FDD)
- Timex Terminal 3000 - A "cut down" computer to be used as a CP/M terminal with FDD3000
- Timex RS232 - A serial RS232 interface
- Sound/Joystick Unit - A sound amplifier for SLCD sounds and Kempston(?) Joystick Interface
- Neptun 156 - To export the Timex Computer to Poland (as the Unipolbrit UK2086), Timex Portugal had to be paid in goods. It chose to import the Neptun 156 12" green monochrome monitor, manufactured in Poland by Unimor company. Based on the Neptun 150 TV receiver, it proved very popular in Portugal and was frequently sold in bundles with the TC computers.
- Timex Printer 2040 - same as the TS2040 printer.

== Software ==
=== Timex Sinclair ===
Timex Computer Corporation, under the Timex Sinclair brand, released 9 business, 20 home management, 30 education and 25 game titles on cassette for the T/S 1000 and T/S 1500. Four titles on cartridges were also released.

For the T/S 2068, 4 business, 13 home management, 29 education and 24 game titles were released on cassette. Seven titles were released on cartridges.

=== Timex Computer ===
Timex Portugal sold/developed the following software, under the Timex Computer brand:

- TOS (Timex Operating System) - Operating system for the FDD/FDD3000
- CP/M for FDD3000 - Advanced operating system for the FDD3000
- Basic 64 - Sinclair BASIC extensions for the TC 2048 and TC 2068, supporting the extra video modes
- Timeword - A word processor in cartridge form that can save to TOS disks or to a tape recorder
- ZX Spectrum Emulator - for the TC 2068 and T/S 2068, in cartridge
