= Tasword =

- Developer: Tasman Software
- Stable release: Tasword II (SAM Coupé) / 1990; 36 years ago
- Operating system: ZX81, ZX Spectrum, Amstrad CPC, MSX, Commodore 64, Tatung Einstein, SAM Coupé
- Type: Word processor
- License: Proprietary

Tasword is a word processor for microcomputers developed by Tasman Software. The first version was released for the ZX81 in 1982 and spawned two major revisions in addition to several add-ons and, later, tailored versions for the +2 and +3 Spectrum models, the SAM Coupé, the MSX, the Timex Sinclair 2068 and the Amstrad CPC range.

Many of the features of modern word processors were included, such as justification, word wrap and page header. Features such as bold text and italic type were achieved through sending special escape sequences to a printer.

It featured the ability to use a 64-character-per-line font in the standard ZX Spectrum screen.

Add-on products included TasMerge for mail merge functionality (which was later included in Tasword III and later versions) and TasSpell as a spell checker.

== Releases ==
=== ZX81 ===
- Tasword - 1982

=== ZX Spectrum ===
- Tasword Two "The Word Processor" - 1983
- Tasword Three "The Word Processor" - 1986

=== Timex Sinclair 2068 ===
- Tasword Two - 1983

=== ZX Spectrum 128 ===
- Tasword 128 "The Word Processor for the Spectrum 128" - 1986
- Tasword +2A - 1991

=== ZX Spectrum +3 ===
- Tasword +3 - 1987

=== Sam Coupe ===
- Tasword II - 1990

=== Commodore 64 ===
- Tasword 64 "The Word Processor" - 1985 (80 column)

=== MSX ===
- Tasword MSX "The Word Processor" - 1984
- Tasword MSX-2 - 1986

=== Amstrad CPC ===
- Tasword 464 "The Word Processor" - 1984
- Tasword D - 1985
- Tasword 6128 "The Word Processor" - 1985

=== Amstrad PCW ===
- Tasword 8000 - 1986

=== Tatung Einstein ===
- Tasword Einstein "The Word Processor" - 1985

=== IBM PC compatible ===
- Tasword PC "The Word Processor" - 1986
- Tasres PC (special Terminate and stay resident version) - 1988
- Tasword 2 PC - 1990 (named TWIX in the Netherlands)
