= BT100 =

- Manufacturer: TESLA Přelouč
- Type: Impact printer
- Released: 1989
- Introductory price: 1500 CSK in 1989 (~ $32 in 1989)
- Dimensions: 250 x 80 x 150 mm
- Weight: 1.5 kg
- Predecessor: CENTRUM T-85

The BT100 was an impact 1-pin dot matrix printer produced in Czechoslovakia by TESLA Přelouč around 1989. It did not have ribbon, instead it used carbon copy paper.

== Design ==
The printer was an improvement over hobby printer CENTRUM T-85 and was designed to be a cheap and therefore very primitive printer for 8-bit home computers. In the BT100, the ink ribbon was completely omitted. Instead a single nail hit paper backed by carbon copy paper to print a single dot on the back side of the paper. This arrangement was introduced to protect thin carbon copy paper from being hit directly by the nail.
Also the internal electronics was simple. The printer head was a single nail with an electromagnet, driven by software on a home computer. A one direction motor for paper movement and a two directions motor to move the printer head were also controlled directly by the computer. To give necessary feedback, the motor axes were connected to plastic discs with cutouts on the perimeter. A LED and a photoresistor were used to detect the disc cutouts and as the disc rotated, a light beam would reach the photoresistor only when facing a cutout. This way, the distance travelled by the motors could be measured, again directly by the software.
With the provided drivers, the printer would print 480 points across A4 paper (58 DPI) with 560 lines on a page (48 DPI). That is 70 lines with 60 to 80 characters on a line. The printer could print one A4 page in 10 minutes in low quality. Higher quality was available at the cost of doubling the time. It was even possible to print on the same paper several times using carbon copy papers of different colors to produce a low quality color print.

== Compatibility ==
The printer was released with drivers for ZX Spectrum, Atari 8-bit computers, and PMD 85. Due to hardware simplicity it is possible to connect the BT100 to many other computers. For example, in 2013, a hobbyist successfully printed on a BT100 connected to a Raspberry Pi.

== Reception ==
The BT100 was considered to be a slow, noisy and low quality printer, even at the time of its introduction. Still, being the most available and by margin the cheapest printer in Czechoslovakia, it gained popularity as an entry level solution. The simple design also encouraged modifications on both hardware and software levels, many of them increased print quality at the cost of slower printing. It was also sold built into a tape recorder under the name SP 210 T.
