= Accusoft =

American software company

Accusoft Corporation
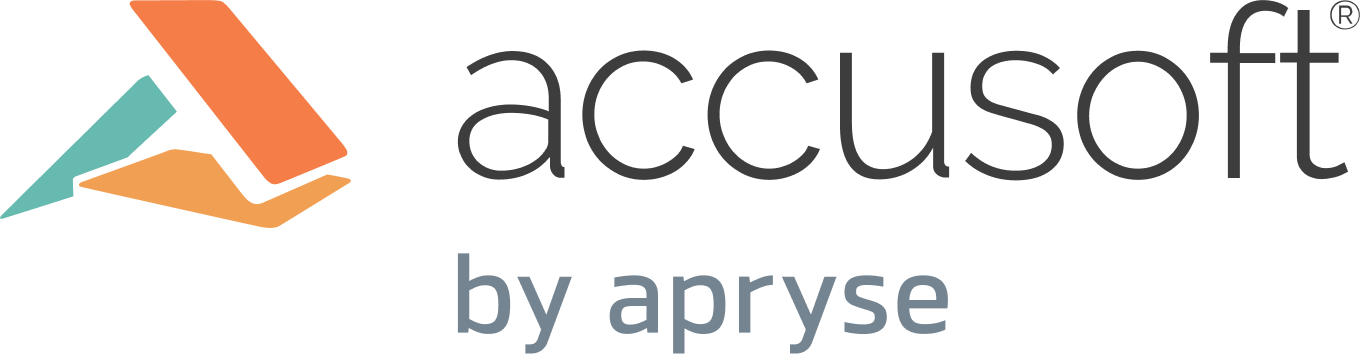
- Company type: Private
- Industry: Computer software
- Founded: 1991 (as Pegasus Imaging); 2009 (as Accusoft Pegasus); 2012 (as Accusoft)
- Headquarters: Tampa
- Key people: Jack Berlin (CEO)
- Products: OCR, document capture, forms processing, barcode, image compression, DICOM, PDF, viewing, mobile
- Website: www.accusoft.com

Accusoft is an American software company headquartered in Tampa, Florida. It was founded in 1991 as Pegasus Imaging, by Jack Berlin. In July 2025, Accusoft was acquired by US document-technology company Apryse.

Currently, the company provides imaging software development kits (SDKs) and applications for multiple platforms and development environments, including iOS, Android, .NET, Silverlight, ASP.NET, ActiveX, Java, Linux, Solaris, macOS, and IBM AIX.

Distribution of products is worldwide through various partners, resellers, and distributors.

== History ==
Accusoft was originally founded as Pegasus Imaging in 1991. It was established by Jack Berlin, who is the CEO and President. In 1997, it acquired Imaging, Barcode, OCR, and ICR companies. TMS Sequoia, a competitor that offered document image cleanup technology, was acquired in 2004.

In December 2008, Accusoft was acquired, adding additional imaging products, including ImageGear. Three weeks later, the acquisition of Tasman Software was announced, adding Java and Java ME Barcode technology. During March 2009, Pegasus Imaging was rebranded to Accusoft Pegasus.

On October 3, 2011, Adeptol was acquired, adding viewing technology to existing viewing product offerings. On February 21, 2012, Accusoft Pegasus was rebranded as Accusoft.

In 2022, Accusoft made its fourth and largest acquisition with Snowbound for an undisclosed amount, which will expand Accusoft's product portfolio to include document viewing and conversion software development kit solutions.

== See also ==
- Tasword
