= Timex Sinclair 2068 =

Home computer released in 1983

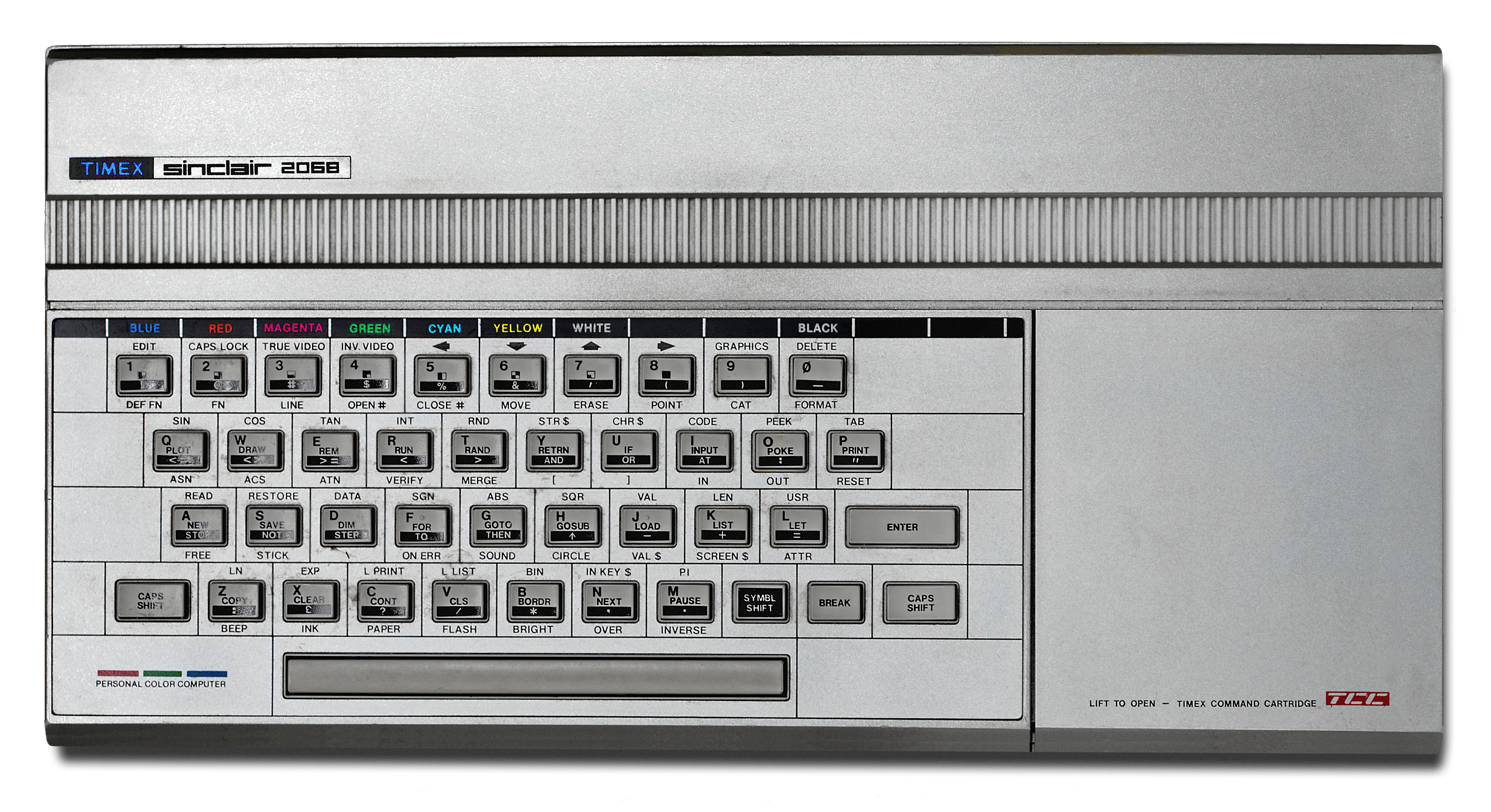
- Type: Home computer
- Released: November 1983; 42 years ago
- Discontinued: 1989
- Operating system: T/S 2000 BASIC (based on Sinclair BASIC)
- CPU: Zilog Z80A @ 3.5 MHz
- Memory: 48 KB
- Display: NTSC TV or video monitor; text: 32×24 lines, 16 colours; graphics: 256×192, 16 colours or 512×192 pixels, two colours; attributes: 32x24 or 32x192, two colours per area.
- Graphics: Timex SCLD
- Sound: Beeper, AY-3-8912
- Predecessor: Timex Sinclair 1500
- Successor: Timex Computer 2048

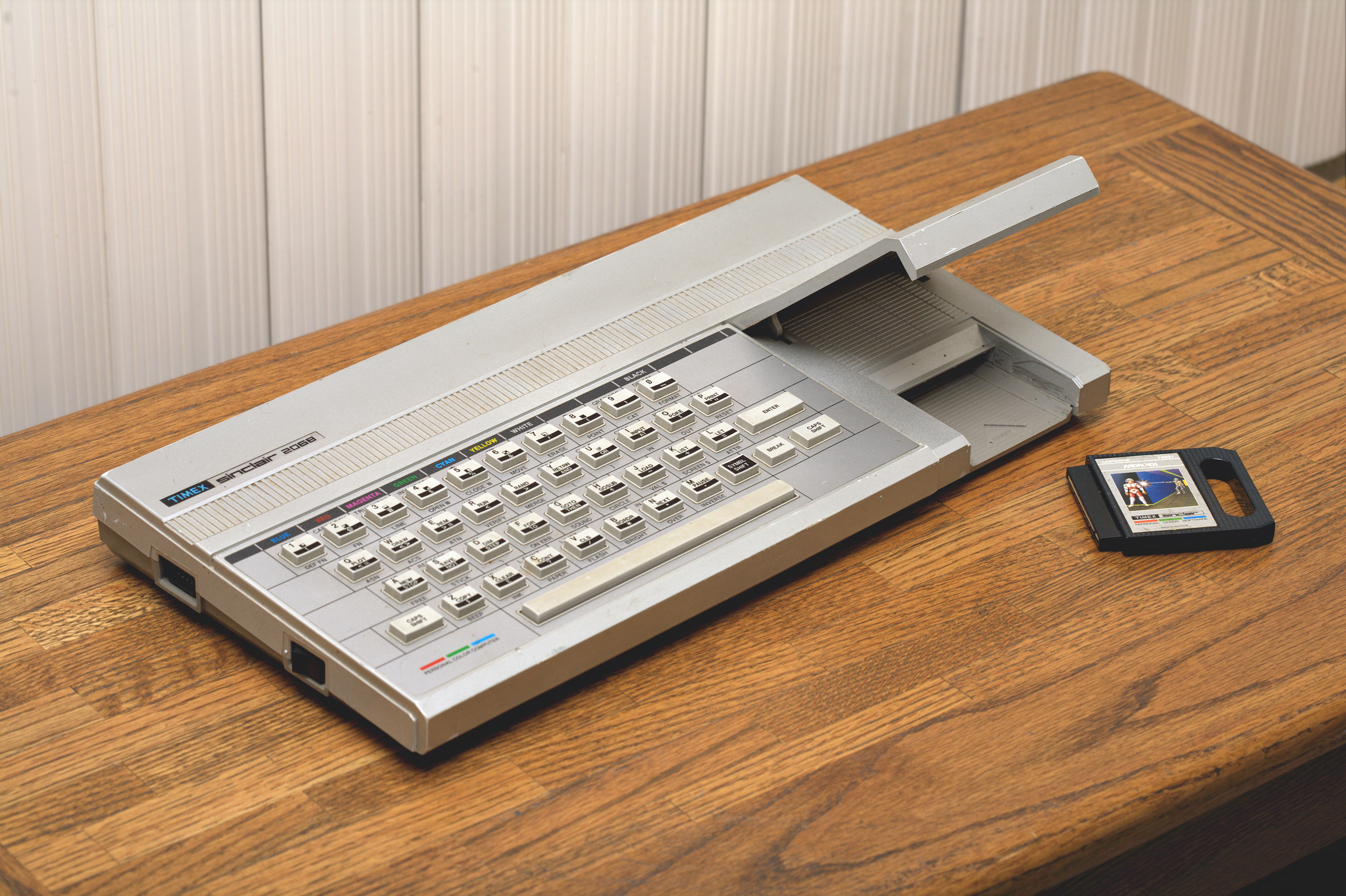
TS 2068 with open ROM cartridge port and a cartridge

The Timex Sinclair 2068 (T/S 2068), released in November 1983, was Timex Sinclair's third and last home computer for the United States market. It was also marketed in Canada, Argentina, Portugal and Poland, as Timex Computer 2068 (TC 2068).

== History ==
Following Timex's ZX81-based T/S 1000 and T/S 1500, a new series of ZX Spectrum-based machines was created. Initially named T/S 2000 (as reflected on the user manual), this early version featured a case and keyboard very similar to that of the ZX Spectrum and was exhibited at the early 1983 CES show where Creative Computing gave it a positive reception.

This model machine evolved into the T/S 2048 prototype, and was eventually released as T/S 2068, with the name chosen mainly for marketing reasons.

Advertisements described the T/S 2068 as offering 72K of memory, color, and sound for a price under $200. Like the T/S 1500 was announced as a 40K memory machine (16K RAM + 24K ROM), so the 2068 was announced as a 72K machine (48K RAM + 24K ROM).

Although Timex Computer Corporation folded in February 1984, the independent Portuguese division continued to sell the machine in Portugal as the Timex Computer 2068, and Poland until 1989, as the Unipolbrit Komputer 2086. Although the Portuguese-made TC 2068 was also sold in Poland, only the Komputer 2086 was actually made there.

Timex of Portugal sold 2 versions of TC 2068: the silver TC 2068 version came with a ZX Spectrum emulator cartridge and a black TC 2068 version sold with TimeWord word processing cartridge plus the Timex RS232 Interface to use TimeWord with a RS232 printer. Strangely the black version came with a silver keyboard template with TimeWord commands to be used with the program. It can be removed because it is not glued to the black keyboard template.

Although the T/S 2068's main improvements over the original Spectrum were in areas that had come in for widespread criticism (graphics, sound, keyboard and—to a lesser extent—the lack of joystick ports and cartridge support), it was not used as the basis for the Spectrum's successors. The ZX Spectrum+ (1984) changed the keyboard only, and even the ZX Spectrum+ 128K (announced in May 1985, but not released in the UK until February 1986) retained the original machine's graphical capabilities. However, unlike the UK models, the T/S 2068 was not burdened by the requirement of compatibility with previous models.

== Related machines ==
=== Timex Sinclair 2048 ===
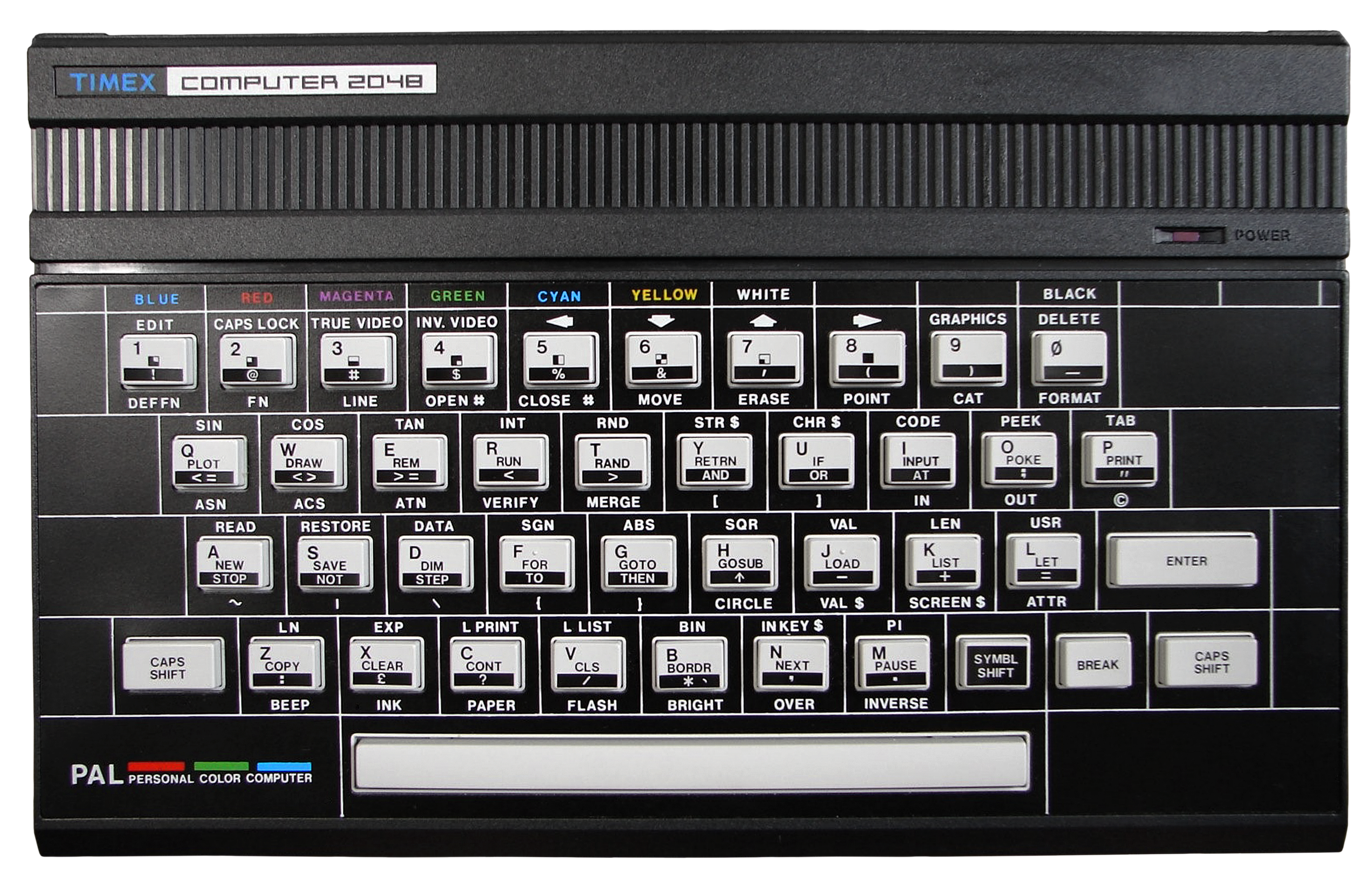
Timex Computer 2048 (based on the T/S 2048 prototype)

A cut-down version of the T/S 2068, based on the T/S 2048 prototype named T/S 2048, was cancelled before entering intended production in 1984. This was due to the commercial failure of the T/S 1500. According to an early Timex Sinclair 2000 computer flyer, it would have 16 KB of RAM, add a Kempston-compatible joystick interface and a two color high resolution mode for 80 column text.

The 2048 model number was the intended model number for what finally got named Timex Sinclair 2068. In an interview with Lou Galie, Senior Vice President of Technology at Timex, he tells what he claims to be the real story. Danny Ross, Timex Computer Corporation president, was giving a speech. Lou points: "When Danny announced what was supposed to be the 2048, he mis-spoke and called it the 2068. When I called him on it, he laughed and said: - Rename it. 2068 is better than 2048.".

Although the T/S 2048 was cancelled, the Timex Computer 2048, based on the T/S 2048 prototype and released in 1984, was sold in Portugal and Poland.

=== Timex Computer 2068 ===
For the TC 2068, Timex of Portugal made some changes the original T/S 2068 hardware, in order to improve compatibility with the original ZX Spectrum. It also created a Spectrum emulator cartridge that would auto-boot. This cartridge was larger, so the TC 2068 casing was changed to accommodate it.

Main hardware changes:

- Replaced the bus buffers with resistors like ZX Spectrum
- Changed the I/O connector to be ZX Spectrum compatible (not requiring the Zebra Twister board)
- Changed the cartridge slot top casing to accept bigger cartridges (for example "Spectrum emulator" and "Timeword" cartridges)
- Uses 9V instead of 15V

=== Unipolbrit Komputer 2086 ===
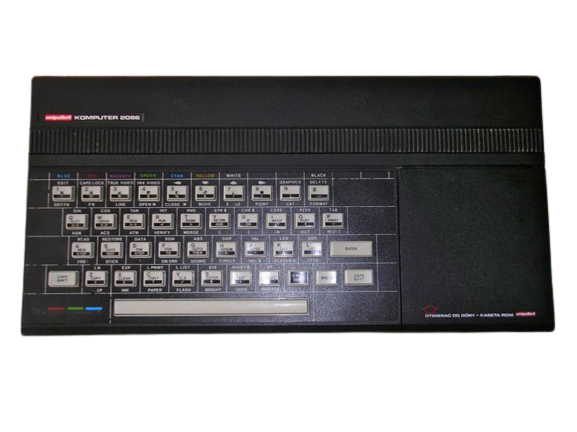
Unipolbrit 2086

A variant of the T/S 2068 was sold in Poland after 1986 under the name Unipolbrit Komputer 2086 (or UK 2086).

The machine was based on the TC 2068, with further changes introduced by that company:

- Modified ROM
- Replaced a joystick port with a parallel printer interface

== Technical specifications ==
The T/S 2068 was a more sophisticated device, compared to its UK ancestor, the ZX Spectrum. Arguably one of the first Sinclair clones to significantly improve on the original design, it added a number of new features:

- an AY-3-8912 sound chip, as later used by Sinclair in the ZX Spectrum+ 128K (but mapped to different I/O ports and thus incompatible)
- twin joystick ports
- a slightly better "chiclet keyboard" with plastic keycaps
- a cartridge port to the right of the keyboard for ROM-based software
- Timex SCLD chip instead of the Spectrum's ULA, offering additional Extended Color, Dual Screen and High Resolution screen modes:
  - Text: 32×24 characters (8×8 pixels, rendered in graphics mode)
  - Graphics: 256×192 pixels, 15 colours (two simultaneous colours - "attributes" - per 8×8 pixels, causing attribute clash)
  - Extended Color: 256×192 pixels, 15 colors with colour resolution of 32×192 (two simultaneous colours - "attributes" - per 8×1 pixels)
  - Dual Screen: (two 256×192 pixels screens can be placed in memory)
  - High Resolution: 512×192 mode with 2 colours (Four palettes: Black & White, Blue & Yellow, Red & Cyan, Magenta & Green).
- improved T/S 2000 BASIC, that extends Sinclair BASIC with new keywords to address new hardware and bank-switched memory, allowing ROM cartridges to be mapped in.

However, these changes made the machine incompatible with most Spectrum machine-code software, which is to say virtually all commercial titles; less than 10% would run successfully. In an attempt to remedy this, many TS users built a cartridge with a Spectrum ROM for emulation.

=== T/S 2000 BASIC ===
T/S 2000 BASIC was an extended version of Sinclair BASIC, adding the following six keywords to the ordinary Sinclair BASIC ones:

- DELETE deletes BASIC program line ranges. CAPS SHIFT+0 with the K cursor produces the command DELETE.
- FREE is a function that gives the amount of free RAM. PRINT FREE will show how much RAM is free.
- ON ERR is an error-handling function mostly used as ON ERR GO TO or ON ERR CONT.
- RESET can be used to reset the behaviour of ON ERR. It was also intended to reset peripherals.
- SOUND controls the AY-3-8192 sound chip.
- STICK is a function that gives the position of the internal joystick (Timex Sinclair 2090).

== Software ==
Timex Computer Corp published 7 cartridges and 37 cassettes along with the launch of T/S 2068. Some titles were released both on cartridge and tape. The software ranged from utilities and personal accounting programs to educational titles and games. Based on the original software catalog, 4 cartridges and 22 of the planned tapes were never released.

Timex of Portugal released cartridges (including the "ZX Spectrum Emulator" and "TimeWord", that came with the TC 2068), tapes and software on disks (ex: Tasword for Timex FDD).

== Reception ==
Popular Mechanics in February 1984 called the Timex Sinclair 2068's keyboard a "mixed blessing" and reported a flaw in the video signal, but liked its BASIC and concluded that "for $200, the 2068 is a nice package".

Magazines dedicated to Timex Sinclair machines were published in the US, like SYNC (from 1981 to 1984) and Timex Sinclair User (1983), and dozens of fanzines and group newsletters also exist.

== See also ==
- Komputer 2086

== Footnotes ==
1. The "2086" in the name was not a corruption of "2068". The "86" derived from the year the computer was first made.
