= Timex Sinclair 1000 =

Home computer launched in 1982

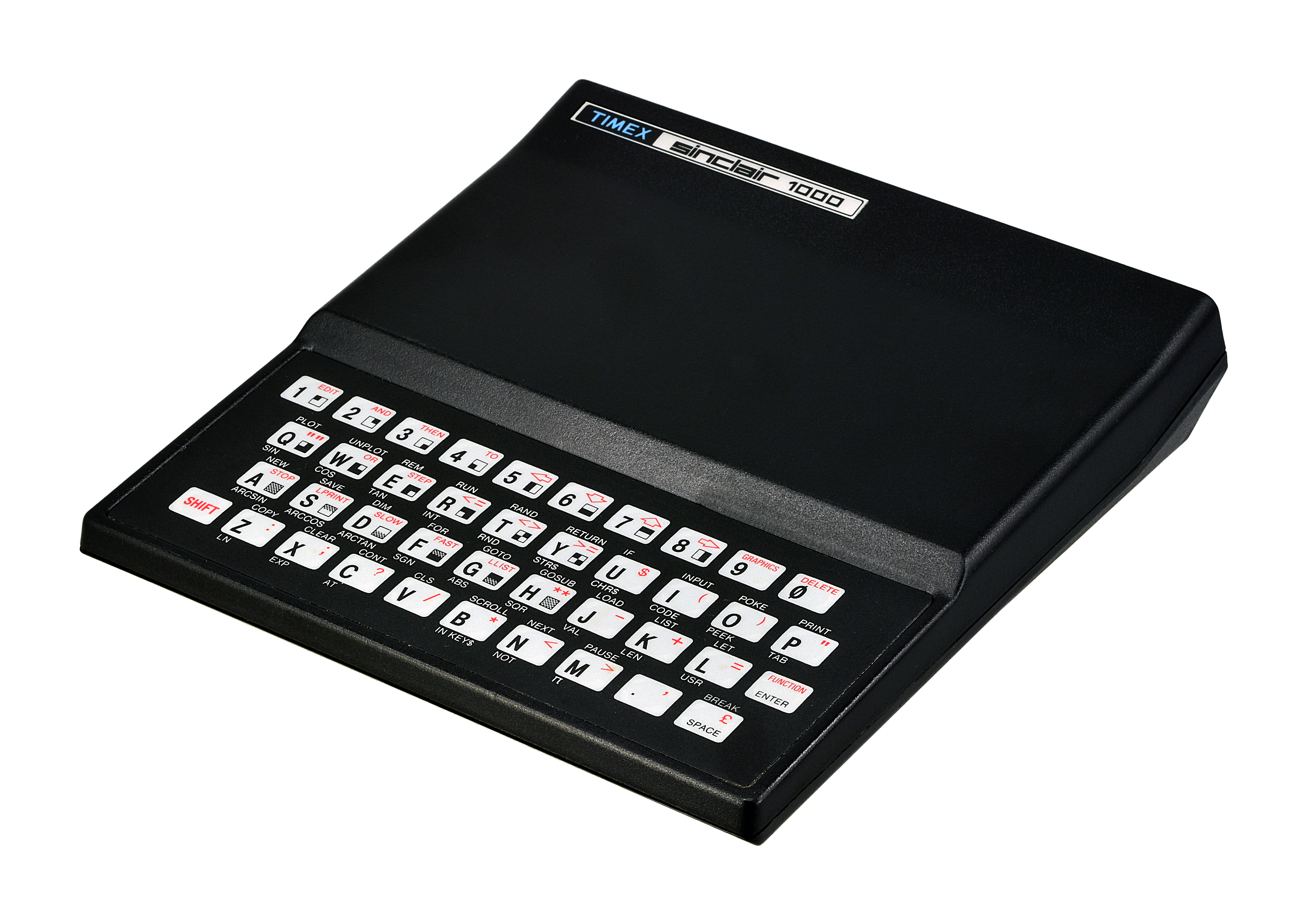
- Also known as: T/S 1000
- Developer: Sinclair Research
- Manufacturer: Timex Corporation
- Type: Home computer
- Released: July 1982; 44 years ago
- Introductory price: $99.95 (equivalent to $333 in 2025)
- Discontinued: 1983
- Operating system: Sinclair BASIC
- CPU: Z80 at 3.25 MHz
- Memory: 2 KB (64 KB max. 56 KB usable)
- Display: Monochrome display on television, NTSC; 24 lines × 32 characters; 64 × 48 pixels semigraphics mode
- Power: 9V DC
- Backward compatibility: ZX81
- Predecessor: ZX80
- Successor: Timex Sinclair 1500

The Timex Sinclair 1000 (or T/S 1000) was the first computer produced by Timex Sinclair, a joint venture between Timex Corporation and Sinclair Research. It was launched in July 1982, with a US sales price of US$99.95, making it the cheapest home computer at the time; it was advertised as "the first computer under $100". The computer was aimed at regular home users. As purchased, the T/S 1000 was fully assembled and ready to be plugged into home televisions, which served as a video monitor. The T/S 1000 was a slightly modified version of the Sinclair ZX81 with an NTSC RF modulator, for use with North American TVs, instead of PAL for European TVs. The T/S 1000 doubled the onboard RAM from 1 KB to 2 KB; further expandable by 16 KB through the cartridge port. The T/S 1000's casing had slightly more internal shielding but remained the same as Sinclair's, including the membrane keyboard, which had modified nomenclature to suit American tastes (e.g. "DELETE" instead of "RUBOUT") Just like the ZX81, the T/S 1000 had black-and-white graphics and no sound.

It was followed in 1983 by an improved version, the Timex Sinclair 1500 (or T/S 1500) which incorporated the 16 KB RAM expansion and featured a lower price (US$80). However, the T/S 1500 did not achieve market success, given that by this time the marketplace was dominated by Commodore, Radio Shack, Atari and Apple.

== History ==
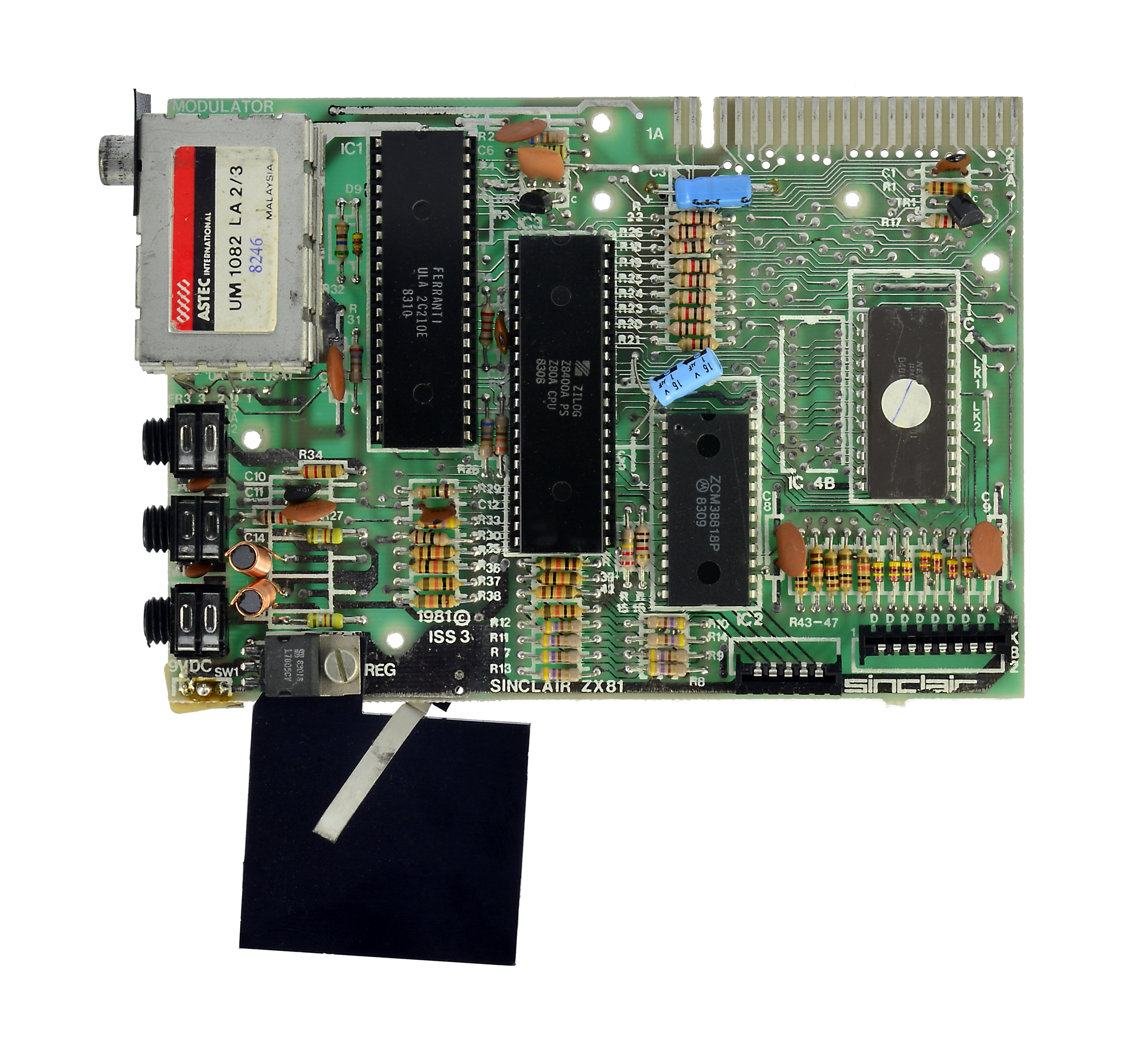
Revision of the Timex Sinclair 1000 motherboard with "Sinclair ZX81" printed on it

Timex claimed to have sold 600,000 T/S 1000s in the US by early 1983, and other companies imported localized versions of British software. It sold for $99.95 (equivalent to $333 in 2025) in the US when it debuted, making it the cheapest home computer at the time; it was advertised as "the first computer under $100". This pricing initiated a price war with Commodore International, who quickly reduced the price of its VIC-20 to match and later announced a trade-in program offering $100 for any competing computer toward the purchase of a Commodore 64. Since the T/S 1000 was selling for $49 by this time, many customers bought them for the sole purpose of trading them in for a Commodore 64.

Like the Sinclair ZX81, the T/S 1000 used 8K BASIC, a version of Sinclair BASIC (a BASIC dialect), as its primary interface and programming language. To make the membrane keyboard less cumbersome for program entry, the T/S 1000 used a shortcut system of one-letter "keywords" for most commands (e.g., pressing P while the cursor was in "keyword mode" would generate the keyword PRINT). Some keywords required a short sequence of keystrokes (e.g., SHIFT-ENTER+S would generate the keyword LPRINT). One notable thing about this version of BASIC was that, unlike other versions where it's optional in a program, the LET command was mandatory.

The T/S 1000 was normally plugged into a regular TV that served as a computer monitor. The computer produced a black-and-white display that consisted of 32 columns and 24 lines. Of those lines, 22 were accessible for display, with two reserved for data entry and error messages. The limited graphics were based on geometric shapes contained within the operating system's non-ASCII character set. The only form of long-term storage was Compact Cassette. The 16 KB memory expansion module sold for $49.95. A shortage of the memory expansion modules coupled with a lack of software that would run within 2 KB meant that the system had little use for anything other than as an introduction to programming. Home computer magazines of the era such as Compute! showed enthusiasts how to interface the computer with various kinds of equipment. These tutorials provided an opportunity to learn about early speech synthesis technology through a Speak & Spell, robotics control through the memory port, and scrolling text displays for advertising.

Over time, the T/S 1000 spawned a cottage industry of third-party add-ons designed to help remedy its limitations and provide more functions. Full-size keyboards, speech synthesizers, sound generators, disk drives, and memory expansions (up to 64 KB) were a few of the options available. Languages such as Forth and Pascal, as well as BASIC compilers and assemblers, augmented the T/S 1000's programming possibilities. Computer enthusiast magazines from the early 1980s included articles that contained programming instructions for simple games and other programs that could be used with the device. Microcomputing magazine published an article in April 1983, criticizing the membrane keyboard ("The designers of the Timex-Sinclair 1000 ... reduced this important programming tool to a fraction of the required size") and describing how to connect external full-size keyboards.

Magazines dedicated to Timex Sinclair machines were published in the US, like SYNC (from 1981 to 1984) and Timex Sinclair User (1983), and dozens of fanzines and group newsletters also existed.

== Peripherals ==
Timex Computer Corporation produced a cartridge interface for the T/S 1000, the Timex Sinclair 1510 Command Cartridge Player. Only four cartridge titles were ever released:

- 07-9001 Supermath
- 07-9002 States and Capitals
- 07-9003 Chess
- 07-9004 Flight Simulator (Required the 16K RAM pack) The program took 12 minutes to load.

The TS1510 can be used with a T/S 1000 and a 16 KB RAM pack (an additional RAM pack). Users could also load programs using a tape recorder and compact cassettes.

Timex released a thermal printer for use with the T/S 1000. The printer retailed for $100.00.

== Timex Sinclair 1500 ==
Timex Sinclair 1500
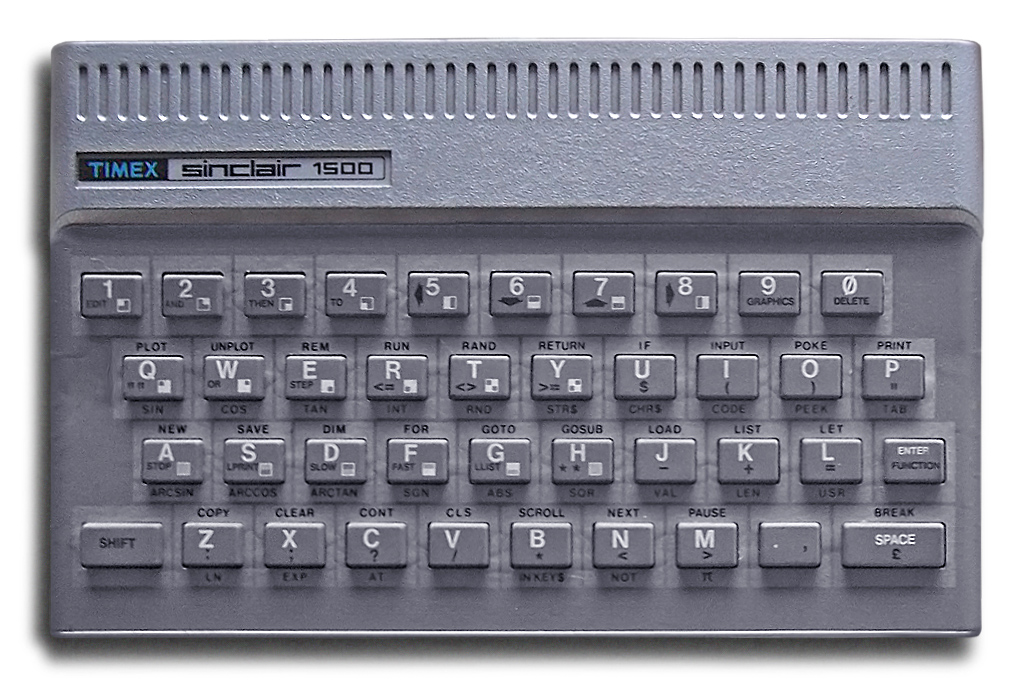
- Also known as: T/S 1500
- Developer: Timex Sinclair
- Manufacturer: Timex Corporation
- Type: Home computer
- Released: 1983; 43 years ago
- Introductory price: $79.95 (equivalent to $258 in 2025)
- Discontinued: 1983
- Operating system: Sinclair BASIC
- CPU: Z80 at 3.25 MHz
- Memory: 16 KB (32 KB max)
- Display: Monochrome display on television, NTSC; 24 lines × 32 characters; 64 × 48 pixels semigraphics mode
- Power: 9V DC
- Backward compatibility: ZX81
- Predecessor: Timex Sinclair 1000
- Successor: Timex Sinclair 2068

The T/S 1500 was an upgraded T/S 1000 with a better keyboard and 16 KB dynamic RAM, introduced in 1983. Timex Sinclair (TMX Portugal) designed the T/S 1500 and offered it to the Timex Corporation. The design utilized the T/S 2000 prototype (ZX Spectrum-like) silver cases that weren't previously used because of the launch of the T/S 2068.

The machine was sold in the United States, Canada and Portugal. It replaced the earlier machine's ZX81-like case with a silver ZX Spectrum-like case, the same ZX Spectrum rubber keyboard, and a custom ULA.

The T/S 1500 did not incorporate the Ferranti ULA but instead uses a 68-pin custom logic chip by NCR. The T/S 1500 used a standard television for its display, "broadcasting" on either channel 2 or 3. It defaulted to TV channel 2, but if 3 was pressed on the keyboard within a few seconds of turning the computer on, it changed to channel 3 instead.

Although the T/S 1500 came with 16 KB internal RAM, an external 16 KB RAM pack could be added for a total of 32 KB RAM. A few keyboard commands (POKE) were required for the system to recognize the additional memory space (the ROMs RAM size check at 'boot' only assumed 16k max and set RAMTOP system variable accordingly for this).

The T/S 1500 sold for $80 and was not a commercial success because of its late launch long after the success of the T/S 1000. The T/S 1000's successor, the T/S 2068, was already available.

=== Bugs ===
There are two little-known software differences between the T/S 1000 and T/S 1500.

On the T/S 1000 and ZX81, the command:

LPRINT 0.00001

results in the Timex printer outputting 0.0XYZ1. This well-known fault was corrected on the T/S 1500.

The T/S 1000 runs the following loop correctly, but the T/S 1500 does not; it makes one fewer iteration than it should.

10 FOR I=0 TO 1 STEP 0.25
20 PRINT I
30 NEXT I
