= Kempston Micro Electronics =

UK electronics company

- Company type: Limited company
- Industry: Computing, Electronics
- Founded: 28 January 1983
- Defunct: 17 December 1993
- Headquarters: Kempston, England, UK

Kempston Micro Electronics was an electronics company based in Kempston, Bedfordshire, England specialising in computer joysticks and related home computer peripherals during the 1980s.

The Kempston Interface, a peripheral which allowed a joystick using the de facto Atari joystick port standard to be connected to the ZX Spectrum, was one of the most widely used add-ons to the machine.

== Interface ==
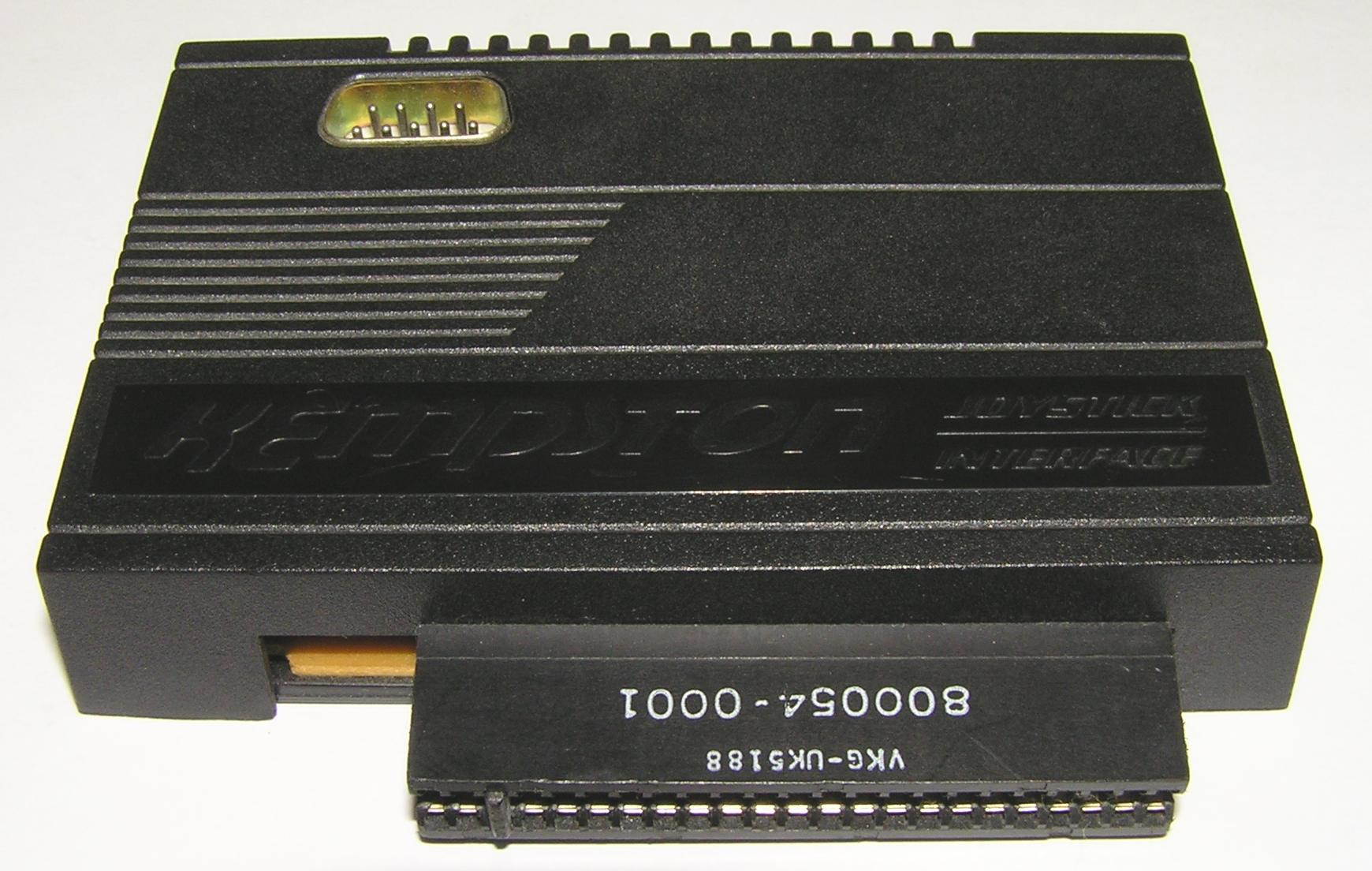
Kempston joystick interface

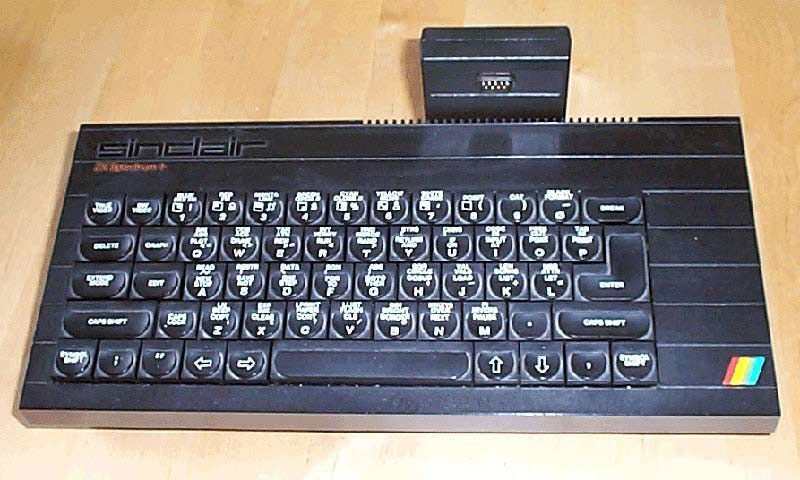
Kempston Interface plugged into a Spectrum Plus

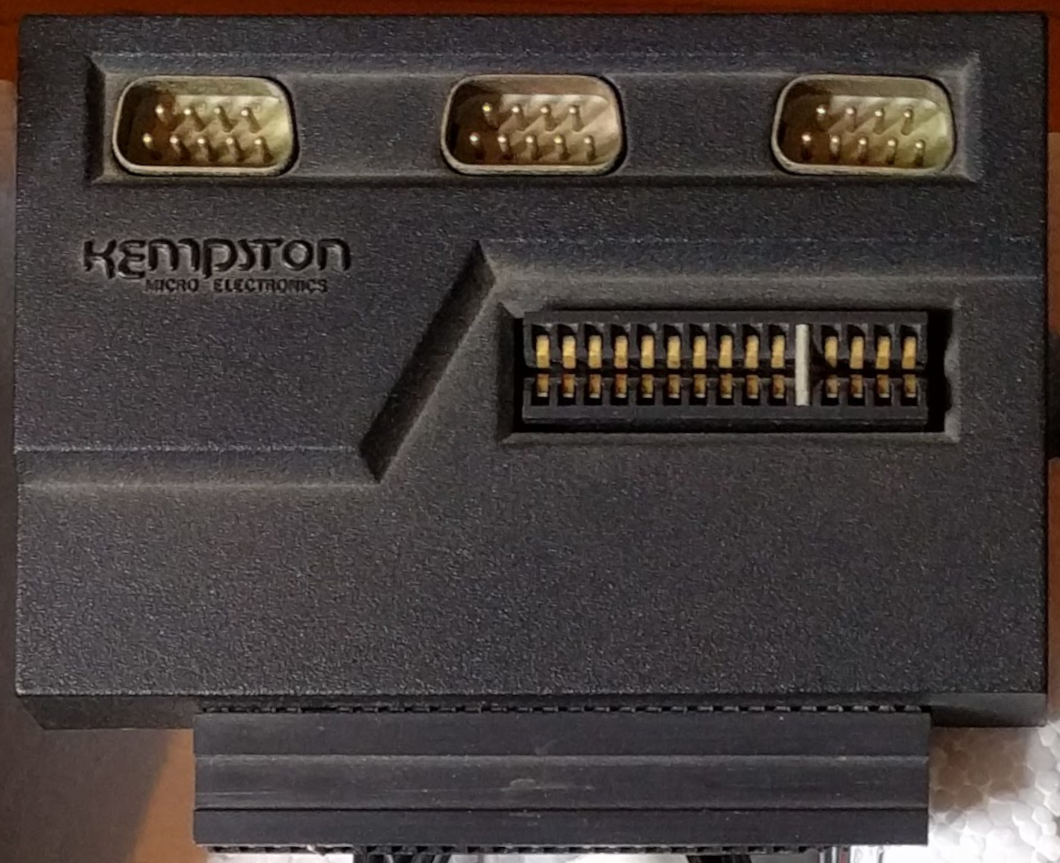
ZX Spectrum Kempston Joystick Interface with 3 ports and cartridge slot

The Kempston Interface is a joystick interface used on the ZX Spectrum series of computers that allows controllers complying with the de facto Atari joystick port standard (using the DE-9 connector) to be used with the machine.

The interface itself would be attached to the computer's rear expansion port with a single joystick port on the front or top of the system.

Apart from implementing existing joystick interfacing modes they produced their own standard which delivered the joystick state on the Z80 bus at port 31 (read in BASIC using IN 31). This meant that the joystick did not produce key-presses like the other standards, such as Cursor, and the method was soon borrowed by other interface manufacturers and became quite popular.

It was one of the most widely supported standards on the machine, coming out as the clear winner against other standards such as Protek and AGF's cursor-based solution and the Fuller standard during the days of the 48K Spectrum.

When Amstrad released the ZX Spectrum +2, the computer featured a built-in joystick interface that was software-compatible with Sinclair's ZX Interface 2 standard. However, the bundled SJS-1 joystick was electrically incompatible with the Atari standard. The Interface 2 standard simulated keypresses on the numerical keys (1 to 5 and 6 to 0 being left, right, down, up, fire for the 'left' and 'right' joysticks respectively) and hence were ideal for games with no official joystick support but in which the keys could be redefined.

Inserting or removing the joystick interface when the computer was turned on was inadvisable as it would almost certainly damage the computer hardware.

== Mouse ==
- x-axis at port 64479
- y-axis at port 65503
- two buttons at port 64223

== Joysticks ==
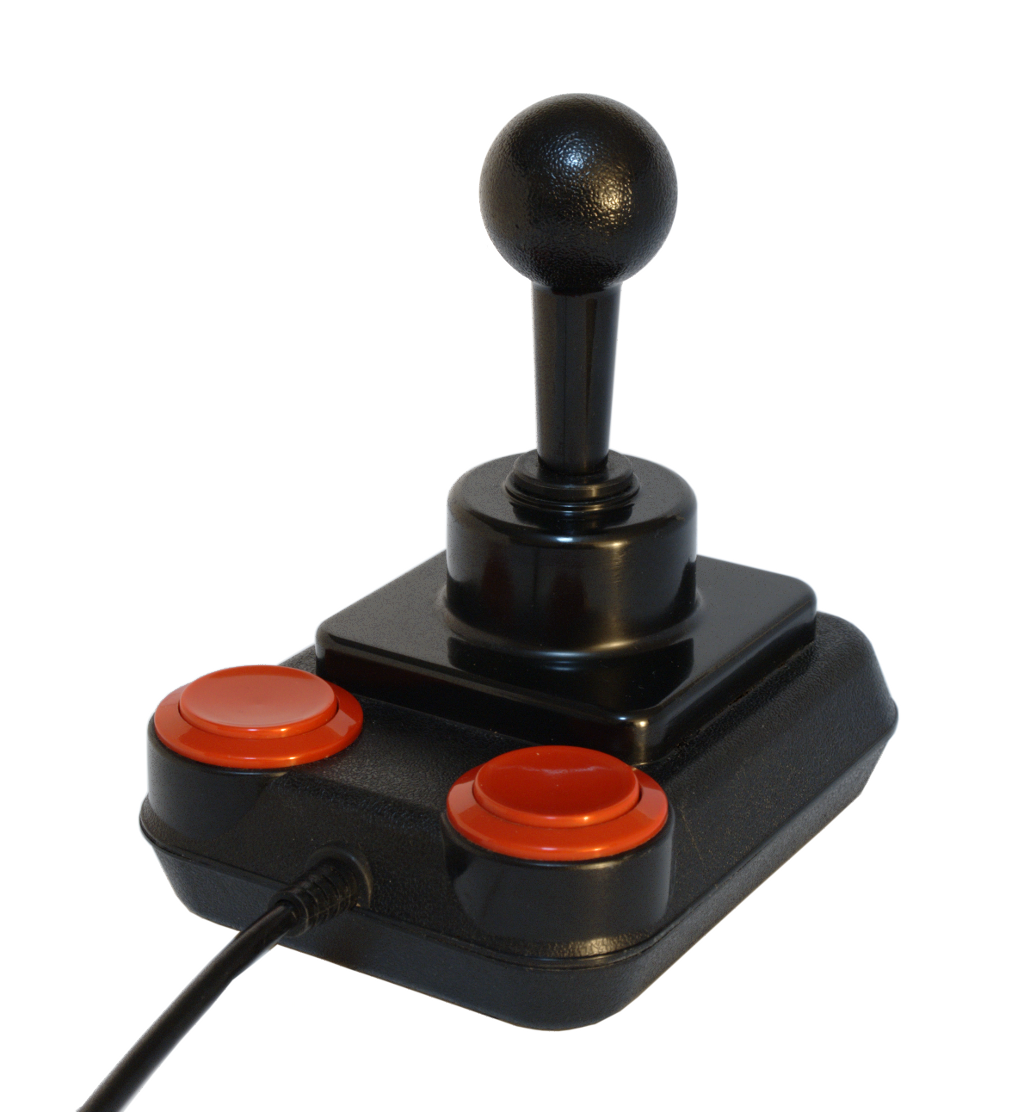
Competition Pro (first version)

The Formula 1 is based on the Quickshot 1 and released June 1985.

The Score Board has a base similar in size to a 48K Spectrum, with two fire buttons. Released June 1985.

The Competition Pro joystick was originally developed by Coin Controls Ltd., with design work primarily attributed to Frank Happ of the company's U.S. operations. Dutch company SUZO International also contributed to the product's development and manufacturing. Kempston Micro Electronics later became a distributor and reseller of the joystick in the United Kingdom, which led to the widespread misconception that Kempston had designed or manufactured the original Competition Pro models. The Competition Pro has a square base, two large red buttons (for left or right-handed use), and a black pommel stick. It uses the Atari 2600 standard DE-9 connector and was primarily designed to work with the ZX Spectrum Kempston joystick interface; it also works with the compatible ports of other home computers such as the Amstrad CPC, Commodore 64, VIC-20, and later Amiga and Atari ST. An Atari 5200 model uses the existing CX52 controller for the keypad functionality.
