= TK82 =

ZX80 clone made by Microdigital Eletrônica in 1981

- Developer: Microdigital Eletrônica
- Manufacturer: Microdigital Eletrônica
- Type: Home computer
- Released: 1981; 45 years ago
- Operating system: 4K Sinclair BASIC
- CPU: Z80A @ 3.25 MHz
- Memory: 2 KB
- Removable storage: External Compact Cassette recorder at 300 bit/s
- Display: Monochrome display on television; 24 lines × 32 characters or 64 × 48 pixels graphics mode
- Graphics: TTL integrated circuits
- Power: 9V DC
- Backward compatibility: ZX80
- Predecessor: TK80
- Successor: TK82C

TK82 was a Sinclair ZX80 clone made by Microdigital Eletrônica Ltda., a computer company located in Brazil. It was introduced along with the TK80 in 1981, during the "I Feira Internacional de Informática".

In the January 1982 issue of Micro Sistemas magazine, Tomas Roberto Kovari, Microdigital's engineer, stated that the machines were being sold with a photocopied manual, while a printed version was being developed. Kovari estimated a potential market for 10000 machines in Brazil, with expected buyers being novelty seekers, students and self employed professionals.

The TK82 was replaced by the TK82C and TK83 Sinclair ZX81 clones. Microdigital later produced the TK90X and TK95, which were clones of the ZX Spectrum.

== General information ==
The TK82 was introduced in 1981, had the Zilog Z80A processor running at 3.25 MHz, 2 KB RAM and a 4 KB ROM with the BASIC interpreter.

The keyboard was made of layers of conductive (membrane) material and followed the Sinclair layout. The video output was sent via a RF modulator to a TV set tuned at VHF channel 3, and featured black characters on a white background. The maximum resolution was 64 x 44 pixels, based on semigraphic characters useful for games and basic images (see ZX80 character set).

== Data Storage ==
Data storage was done in audio cassette tapes at 300 bits per second, and large programs could take up to 6 minutes to load. Audio cables were supplied with the computer for connection with a regular tape recorder.

As the data encoding was entirely done by software, some hacks were made available to allow faster transfers. Hi-fi recorders were required in order to use the greater speeds with a minimum of reliability.
