= TK82C =

ZX81 clone made by Microdigital Eletrônica in 1981

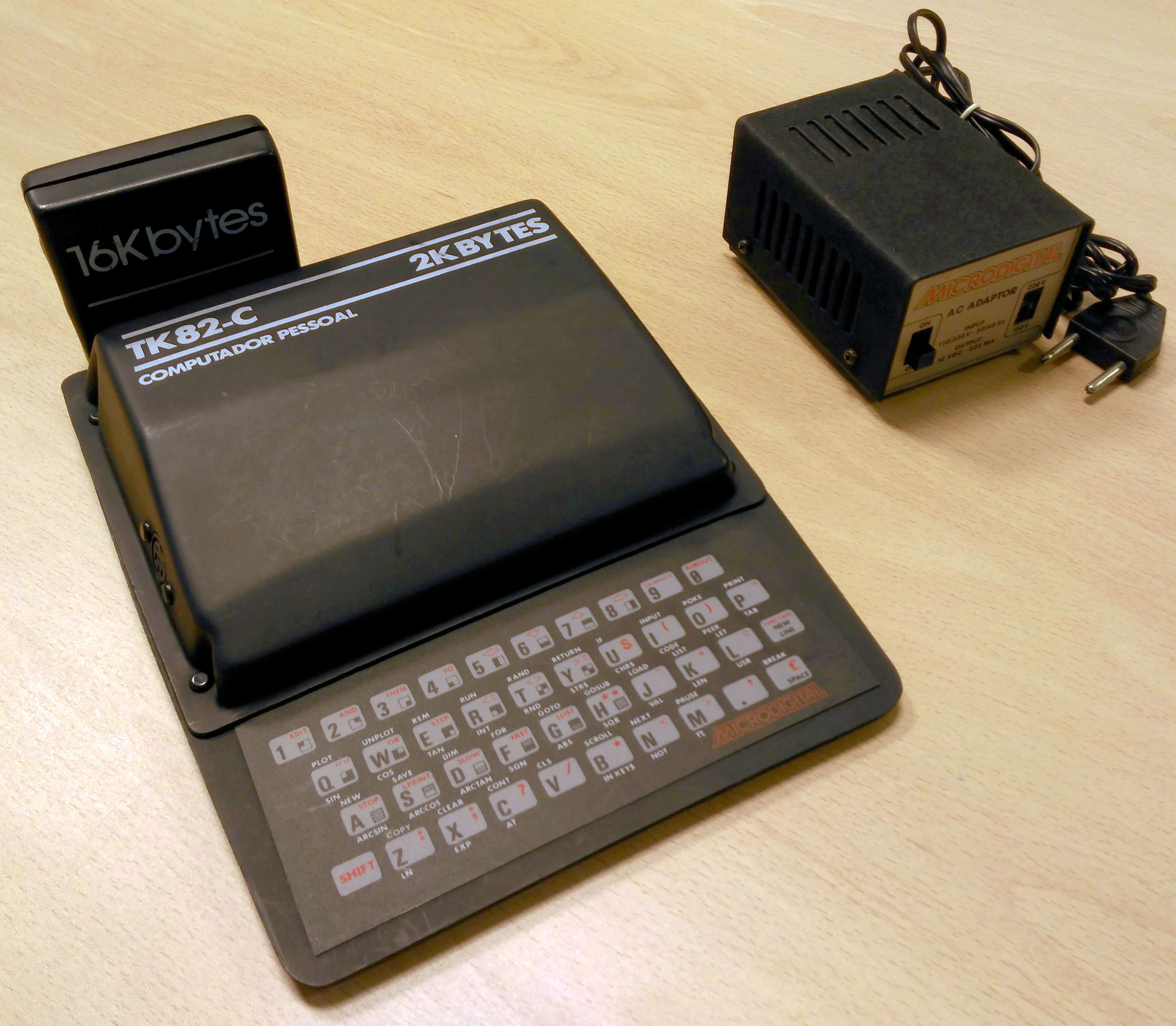
- Developer: Microdigital Eletrônica
- Manufacturer: Microdigital Eletrônica
- Type: Home computer
- Released: 1983; 43 years ago
- Operating system: 8K Sinclair BASIC
- CPU: Z80A @ 3.25 MHz
- Memory: 2 KB SRAM and 8 KB of EPROM
- Removable storage: External Compact Cassette recorder at 300 bps
- Display: Monochrome display on television; 24 lines × 32 characters or 64 × 48 pixels graphics mode
- Graphics: TTL integrated circuits
- Power: 9V DC
- Backward compatibility: ZX81
- Predecessor: TK82
- Successor: TK83, TK85
- Related: TK90X

TK82C was a Sinclair ZX81 clone made by Microdigital Eletrônica Ltda., a computer company located in Brazil.

== General information ==
The TK82C had the Zilog Z80A processor running at 3.25 MHz, 2 KB SRAM and 8 KB of EPROM with the BASIC interpreter. The C letter stands for "Científico", or "Scientific" in English.

The keyboard was made of layers of conductive (membrane) material and followed the Sinclair layout. The video output was sent via a RF modulator to a TV set tuned at VHF channel 3, and featured black characters on a white background. The maximum resolution was 64 x 44 pixels, based on semigraphic characters useful for games and basic images (see ZX81 character set).

The TK82C included the SLOW function, which permitted the video be shown during the processing (the prior version, TK82, a Sinclair ZX80 clone, ran only in fast mode, so the image was not shown during its processing). In reality, the SLOW function was done by an add-on board that was factory-mounted over the main board.

Although being a ZX81 clone, the TK82C did not have the ULA chip from Ferranti, used in the former. Instead it was manufactured with a dozen of TTL integrated circuits, which resulted in a somewhat large power consumption. This could be noted as the computer's case used to become quite hot after some minutes of operation.

== Data Storage ==
Data storage was done in audio cassette tapes at 300 bits per second, and large programs could take up to 6 minutes to load. Audio cables were supplied with the computer for connection with a regular tape recorder.

As the data encoding was entirely done by software, some hacks were made available to allow much faster transfers. Hi-fi recorders were required in order to use the greater speeds with a minimum of reliability.

== Accessories ==
- A 16 KB DRAM expansion was made available and, despite being optional, became a standard item. Soon after, a 48 KB expansion was also released, but due to pricing and the problematic data storage in cassettes, it never sold well.
- The TK82C featured a DIN connector for a joystick (in reality, it was wired to the keyboard matrix); Microdigital then marketed an Atari 2600 joystick, accordingly retrofitted to match the DIN connector.
- A small printer, indeed a ZX Printer clone, was announced for a long time by Microdigital, but was never released.

== Compatibility and Legal Issues ==
All software designed to the ZX81 could run in the TK82C with no problems, and vice versa. So it was not uncommon to find software distributed in Brazil, that were nothing more than illegitimate copies of products for the ZX81. However, given the TK82's popularity, a great deal of original software was developed in Brazil as well.

In 1983, Sinclair Research sued Microdigital over copyright violation because of the unauthorized cloning of its product. Due to political trends from that time, the Brazilian court in charge of the case sided with Microdigital.

== Later Products ==
The TK82C was replaced by the TK83 (it used a ULA similar chip, as the original ZX81) and by the TK85 (a 16 KB RAM version with a case similar to ZX-Spectrum), more robust and with a better design.

Microdigital later produced the TK90X and TK95, which were clones of the ZX Spectrum.

== Trivia ==
TK82C is also a designation for a copier from Kyocera.
