= ZX Spectrum character set =

Character set

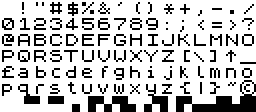
- The ZX Spectrum character set as rendered in the system font (not including User-Defined Graphics characters)
- Language: English with pseudographics
- Created by: Sinclair Research
- Based on: ASCII-1967
- Preceded by: ZX81 character set
- Other related encodings: ZX80 character set, Jupiter Ace character set

The ZX Spectrum character set is the variant of ASCII used in the ZX Spectrum family computers. It is based on ASCII-1967 but the characters ^, ` and DEL are replaced with ↑, £ and ©. It also differs in its use of the C0 control codes other than the common BS and CR, and it makes use of the 128 high-bit characters beyond the ASCII range. The ZX Spectrum's main set of printable characters and system font are also used by the Jupiter Ace computer.

== Printable characters ==
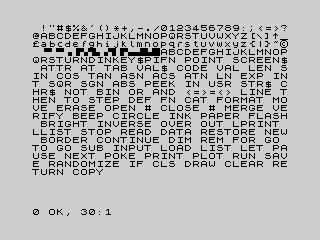
Screenshot of output from a Sinclair BASIC program that demonstrates all printable code points including BASIC keywords and the User-Defined Graphics characters (by default defined as copies of the A-U glyphs)

Standard US-ASCII, 0x20–0x7F, is included in the Spectrum character set except that code point 0x5E is an up-arrow (↑) instead of a caret (^), 0x60 is the pound sign (£) instead of the grave accent (`), and 0x7F is the copyright sign (©) instead of the control character DEL. Note that the use of 0x5E as ↑ was also the case in the older 1963 version of ASCII. The £ sign was not mapped to 0x23 as in the British variant of ASCII (ISO-646-GB), allowing both the pound sign and the number sign (#) simultaneously. The ↑ character is the exponentiation operator in the Spectrum's version of Sinclair BASIC, just like the ^ it replaces compared to ASCII-1967 is used for exponentiation in many other dialects of BASIC and other programming languages.

Beyond 0x7F, the Spectrum character set uses the high-bit range 0x80–0xFF for special purposes. 0x80–0x8F contain the same 2×2 block graphics characters that the ZX80 character set and the ZX81 character set have (at other locations), also available in the Block Elements Unicode block. However, the ZX Spectrum's standard character set does not include the ZX80/81 50% dithered 1×2 block graphics characters. Code points 0x90–0xA4 contain the originally 21 User-Defined Graphics (UDG) characters, and 0xA5–0xFF contain BASIC keywords tokenized as single code points. In the 128 BASIC mode introduced later, this was changed to 19 UDG characters ending at 0xA2 followed by the two new tokens SPECTRUM and PLAY. Code points 0xC7–0xC9 are the two-character operators <=, >= and <>, similarly tokenized into single code points. These tokens allow a BASIC command like PRINT to be entered with the single keypress P at the beginning of a line (i.e. in command mode), which generated 0xF6. That is displayed as the full keyword PRINT on screen but only a single byte token is stored so only that single byte need be parsed by the interpreter or saved to/loaded from external storage such as tape.

All non-UDG Spectrum characters can be mapped to Unicode. The three non ASCII-1967 characters ↑, £ and © are at U+2191, U+00A3 and U+00A9. The 2×2 block graphics characters are in the Block Elements block at U+2580–U+259F although font support for the latter is not universal.

The shape of the UDG characters is mapped to a RAM memory area and is initialized to copies of characters A-U, but can be redefined arbitrarily for example using the BASIC command POKE. Like all characters in the system font they use an 8×8 pixel grid stored in 8 bytes. Redefining them changes their appearance in subsequent PRINT statements but it does not change any UDG characters already drawn on the screen. The location of a UDG character's definition can be determined with the BASIC function USR with the character as the argument, e.g. USR "A" for the first one. By default this points to the last 168 (21×8) bytes of RAM at memory addresses 65368 (0xFF58) to 65535 (0xFFFF) for a 48K Spectrum. The location is pointed to by the system variable UDG which can be found at memory address 23675/6 (0x5C7B/C) and can be changed. The TK90X, a Brazilian clone of the ZX Spectrum included an in ROM application to graphically edit these UDG characters, along with functionality to preload them with accented letters used in Portuguese. (For this, the TK90X defined two extra Basic commands at the codes 0 and 1, respectively TRACE and UDG)

The definition of the main system font, 32 (space) to 127 (copyright), are referenced by the system variable CHARS which can be found at memory address 23606/7 (0x5C36/7). It is defined as 256 bytes lower than the first byte of the space character, simplifying the formula for locating a character to CHARS+8×code point. The CHARS value defaults to the value 15360 (0x3C00), with the system font at the end of the Spectrum's ROM at address 15616 (0x3D00) to 16383 (0x3FFF). Entire alternative fonts can be loaded into RAM and the CHARS variable re-pointed accordingly.

== Control codes ==
In the control codes area (the C0 range), the Spectrum mostly uses proprietary controls, such as INK and PAPER to control foreground and background colour. However, the common BS and CR code points are the same as in ASCII. Cursor-down (0x0A, ASCII Line Feed) can be simulated with 32 spaces printed with OVER 1 (transparent overprint) and cursor-up 0x0B (ASCII Vertical Tabulation) can be simulated with 32 backspaces. The system ROM has a fault which prevents cursor-right at 0x09 (cf. ASCII Horizontal Tabulation) from working.

Control code 0x0E is used to indicate that a floating-point number follows, to accelerate text processing. In a Sinclair BASIC program numeric constants are stored as ASCII followed by a 0x0E byte and a 5-byte binary floating point representation. When listing a BASIC program only the ASCII part is used but at runtime only the binary representation is used. Some Spectrum programs exploited this to obfuscate numbers, while others did so to save memory. For example, a BASIC line displayed as GO TO 10 could contain the ASCII characters for digits 1 and 0 followed by a 0x0E byte and the floating-point representation of 100 instead of 10. Anyone listing that program saw the number 10, but when executed the program jumped to line 100.

== Undefined codes ==
Ranges 0x00–0x05, 0x07, 0x0A–0x0C, 0x0F and 0x17–0x1F are undefined. In most cases, they will produce a question mark if printed to the display. However, they may be used to represent their literal numeric values in conjunction with certain control codes: for example, 0x10 + 0x02 sets the ink (foreground text) colour to colour number 2 (red).

== Character set ==
The following table shows the ZX Spectrum character set. Each character is shown with a potential Unicode equivalent. Space and control characters are represented by the abbreviations for their names.

Spectrum Character Set
	0_ keypress	0_ character	1_	2_	3_	4_	5_	6_	7_	8_	9_	A_	B_	C_	D_	E_	F_
_0			INK		0	@	P	£ (Note: Different from US-ASCII.)	p		(A) (Note: UDG (User-Defined Graphics) character.)	(Q)	VAL	USR	FORMAT	LPRINT	LIST
_1			PAPER	!	1	A	Q	a	q		(B)	(R)	LEN	STR$	MOVE	LLIST	LET
_2			FLASH	"	2	B	R	b	r		(C)	(S)	SIN	CHR$	ERASE	STOP	PAUSE
_3			BRIGHT	#	3	C	S	c	s		(D)	(T) (Note: UDG T in 48 BASIC, keyword SPECTRUM in 128 BASIC.)	COS	NOT	OPEN #	READ	NEXT
_4	true video		INVERSE	$	4	D	T	d	t		(E)	(U) (Note: UDG U in 48 BASIC, keyword PLAY in 128 BASIC.)	TAN	BIN	CLOSE #	DATA	POKE
_5	inv video		OVER	%	5	E	U	e	u		(F)	RND	ASN	OR	MERGE	RESTORE	PRINT
_6	caps lock	comma	AT	&	6	F	V	f	v		(G)	INKEY$	ACS	AND	VERIFY	NEW	PLOT
_7	edit		TAB	'	7	G	W	g	w		(H)	PI	ATN	<=	BEEP	BORDER	RUN
_8	left	left (Note: In the Standard ROM CHR$ 8 fails backing from line 1 to line zero, and fails in a different way backing off line zero.)		(	8	H	X	h	x		(I)	FN	LN	>=	CIRCLE	CONTINUE	SAVE
_9	right	right (Note: In the Standard ROM CHR$ 9 does not actually move the text output position.)		)	9	I	Y	i	y		(J)	POINT	EXP	<>	INK	DIM	RANDOMIZE
_A	down			*	:	J	Z	j	z		(K)	SCREEN$	INT	LINE	PAPER	REM	IF
_B	up			+	;	K	[	k	{		(L)	ATTR	SQR	THEN	FLASH	FOR	CLS
_C	delete			,	<	L	\	l	|		(M)	AT	SGN	TO	BRIGHT	GO TO	DRAW
_D	enter	enter		-	=	M	]	m	}		(N)	TAB	ABS	STEP	INVERSE	GO SUB	CLEAR
_E	extend	number (Note: Used in BASIC programs as a marker prefixing a 5-byte floating point number.)		.	>	N	↑	n	~		(O)	VAL$	PEEK	DEF FN	OVER	INPUT	RETURN
_F	graphics			/	?	O	_	o	©		(P)	CODE	IN	CAT	OUT	LOAD	COPY

== See also ==
- ZX80 character set
- ZX81 character set
- Sinclair QL character set
- PETSCII
- ATASCII
- Atari ST character set
- Extended ASCII
