= TK-3000 IIe =

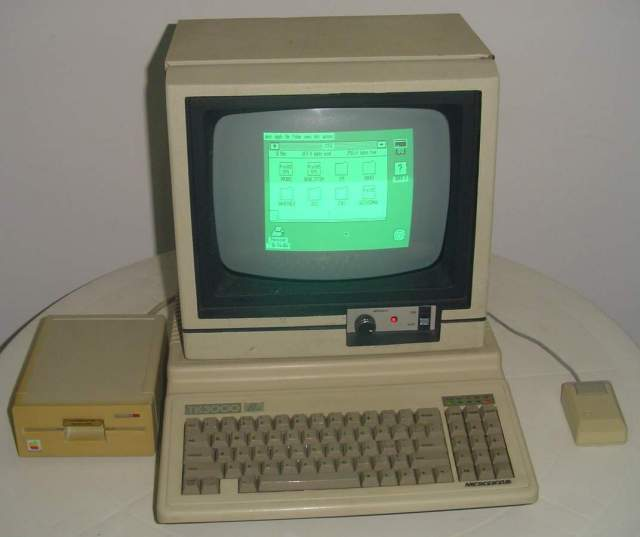
- TK 3000 IIe with a monochrome monitor, 5.25″ disc drive and Apple Mouse running GEOS.
- Manufacturer: Microdigital Eletrônica
- Type: Personal computer
- Released: April 1986; 40 years ago
- Discontinued: June 1987; 38 years ago
- CPU: WDC 65C02 ; Zilog Z80 @ 1 MHz; 2 MHz
- Memory: 64 KB
- Display: PAL-M RF and composite; up to 280x192, 6 colors (extra modes with memory expansions)
- Sound: Beeper
- Backward compatibility: Apple IIe Enhanced

The TK 3000 IIe is a personal microcomputer model manufactured by the Brazilian company Microdigital Eletrônica Ltda., compatible with the Apple IIe Enhanced. It was presented to the public at the V International Computing Fair in September 1985, and entered the market in April 1986 with a retail price of Cz$ 12,500.00 (approximately R$ 13,000.00 in updated values as of September 2023). In 1987 an updated version, the TK 3000 IIe COMPACT was released.

== Details ==
Due to Apple using dedicated integrated circuits (ASICs, called MMU (Memory Management Unit and IOU Input / Output Unit) in the Apple IIe, copying these became more complicated compared to the Apple II and Apple II Plus, which were based on off-the-shelf integrated circuits. For this reason, Microdigital had to reverse engineer these components to achieve compatibility with the Apple model. Microdigital designed two dedicated integrated circuits used in the TK 3000 IIe, the MC168300 and the MC168310, performing functions similar to the MMU and IOU integrated circuits, respectively.

A complete Zilog Z80 computer (CPU + RAM + ROM) is used for keyboard control replacing the AY-5-3600 keyboard controller integrated circuit used in the Apple model, adding some functional features like accented characters.

The TK 3000 IIe was sold with two different cover models: One simple, flat, like any Apple II case, and another with space for two slim 5.25″ disk drives, making them embedded in the case.

=== Technical specifications ===
- CPU: WDC 65C02 (1MHz); Zilog Z80 (2MHz)
- Memory: 16KB ROM; 64 KB RAM
- Keyboard: 77 keys, QWERTY layout
- Video: up to 280x192, 6 colors; extra modes with memory expansions; PAL-M RF and composite out
- Expansion: 7 internal Apple II slots, 1 external Apple IIe slot;
- Peripherals: analog game port; cassette port

== TK 3000 IIe COMPACT ==
TK 3000 IIe COMPACT
- Manufacturer: Microdigital Eletrônica
- Type: Personal computer
- Released: June 1987; 38 years ago
- CPU: WDC 65C02 ; Zilog Z80 @ 1 MHz; 2 MHz
- Memory: 64 + 64 KB; 64 + 256 KB
- Removable storage: 5.25" disk drives
- Display: PAL-M RF and composite out; up to 560x192, 16 colors;
- Sound: Beeper
- Backward compatibility: Apple IIe Enhanced

The TK 3000 IIe COMPACT, released in June 1987, had the same features as the TK 3000 IIe adding more memory, 80 column text display, printer interface, interface for two disc drives, but only had the single external expansion slot. The case was similar to the one used in the TK 2000.

=== Technical specifications ===
- CPU: WDC 65C02 (1MHz); Zilog Z80 (2MHz)
- Memory: 32KB ROM; 64 + 64 KB or 64 + 256 KB RAM
- Keyboard: 77 keys, QWERTY layout, numeric keypad
- Video: up to 560x192, 16 colors; PAL-M RF and composite out
- Expansion: 7 internal Apple II slots, 1 external Apple IIe slot;
- Peripherals: analog game port; two Apple 5.25" disk drives; printer port
