= Sinclair QL character set =

Character encoding used by the Sinclair QL computer

- The Sinclair QL character set rendered in the system font as per the original ROM firmware.
- Language: English
- Created by: Sinclair Research

The Sinclair QL character set was developed by Sinclair Research for the Sinclair QL personal computer.

== Character set ==
Sinclair QL standard character set
	0	1	2	3	4	5	6	7	8	9	A	B	C	D	E	F
2x	SP	!	"	#	$	%	&	'	(	)	*	+	,	-	.	/
3x	0	1	2	3	4	5	6	7	8	9	:	;	<	=	>	?
4x	@	A	B	C	D	E	F	G	H	I	J	K	L	M	N	O
5x	P	Q	R	S	T	U	V	W	X	Y	Z	[	\	]		_
6x	£	a	b	c	d	e	f	g	h	i	j	k	l	m	n	o
7x	p	q	r	s	t	u	v	w	x	y	z	{	|	}	~	©
8x	ä	ã	å	é	ö	õ	ø	ü	ç	ñ	æ	œ	á	à	â	ë
9x	è	ê	ï	í	ì	î	ó	ò	ô	ú	ù	û	ß	¢	¥	`
Ax	Ä	Ã	Å	É	Ö	Õ	Ø	Ü	Ç	Ñ	Æ	Œ	α	δ	θ	λ
Bx	μ	π	ϕ	¡	¿	(Note: a mirrored S (Ƨ) with an underdot. (Erroneously referred to as "Swedish script mark" in the German translation of the QL User Guide))	§	¤	«	»	°	÷	←	→	↑	↓

== See also ==
- ZX80 character set
- ZX81 character set
- ZX Spectrum character set
- PETSCII
- ATASCII
- Atari ST character set
- Extended ASCII
