= Microdigital Eletronica =

Brazilian computer company

Microdigital Eletrônica
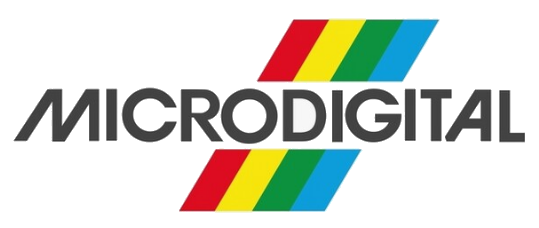
- Type: Sociedade Anônima
- Industry: Computer System; Software
- Founded: 1981; 45 years ago
- Defunct: 1990; 36 years ago
- Headquarters: São Paulo, Brazil
- Key people: Jorge and Tomas Kovari
- Products: Computer Monitors; Personal Computer; Laptops
- Subsidiaries: Microhobby Magazine

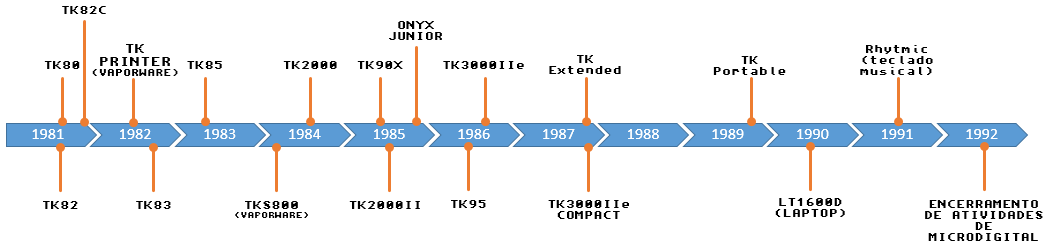
Microdigital timeline

Microdigital Eletrônica Ltda. was a Brazilian computer company in the 1980s, based in São Paulo.

== History ==
Established in 1981 by the brothers Jorge and Tomas Kovari (whose initials were the TK of the domestic computers line made by the company), its first product was the TK80, a clone of the British microcomputer Sinclair ZX80.

The company reached its height around 1985, with the launching of the TK90X (clone of the ZX Spectrum) and the TK 2000/II, a personal computer partially compatible (at Applesoft BASIC level) with the Apple II+. At this time, it had approximately 400 employees in three plants (two in São Paulo and one in the Zona Franca de Manaus) and more than 700 peddlers spread for all Brazil.

Although the logo of the company is identical to the earlier Microdigital Ltd of the United Kingdom the company is not related.

== Line of products ==
A not extensive list of Microdigital's products:

=== Home computers ===
- TK80 (1981)
- TK82 (1981)
- TK82C (1981)
- TK83 (1982)
- TK85 (1983)
- TKS800 (1984 - vapourware)
- TK90X (1985)
- TK95 (1986)
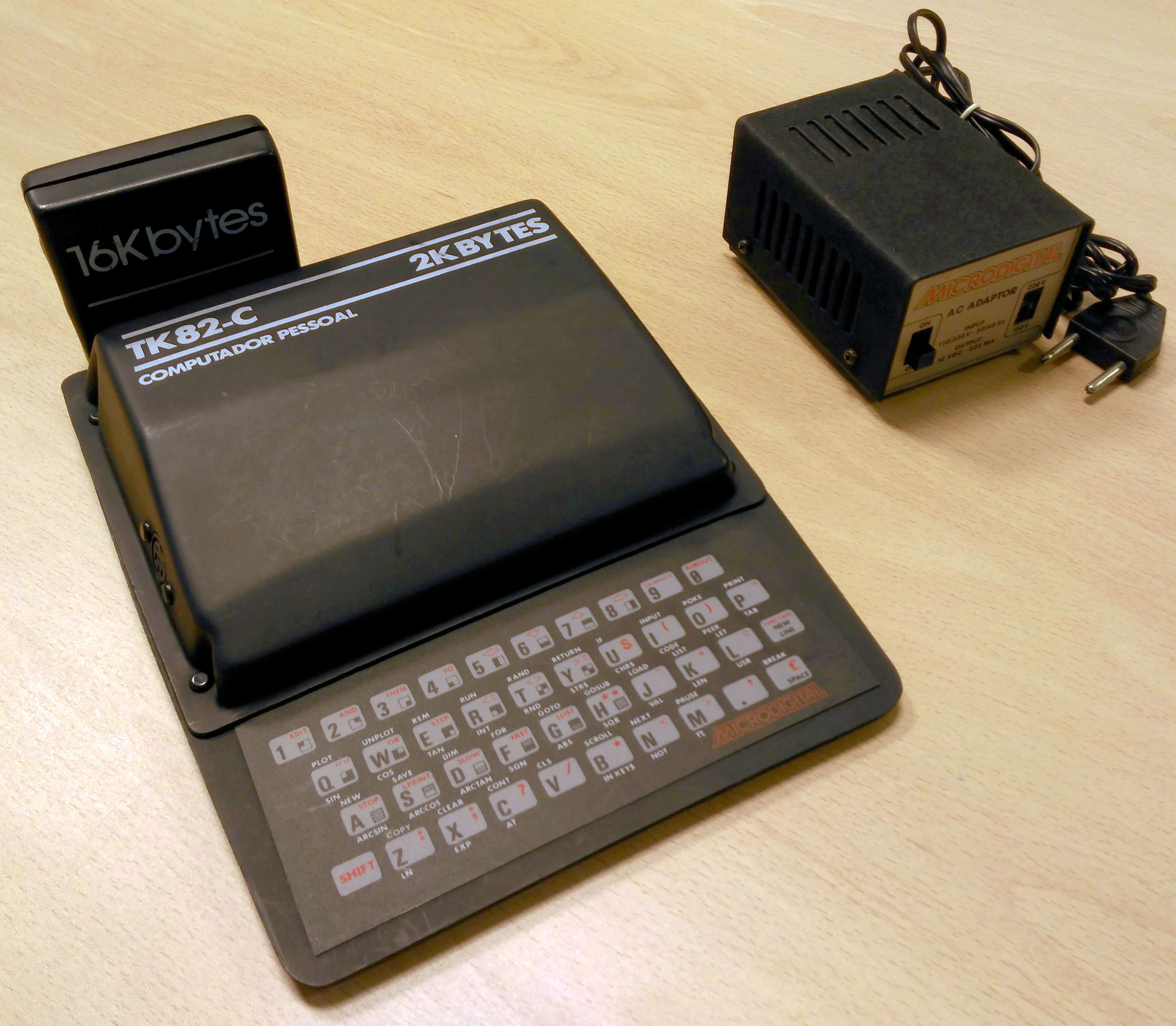
TK82C

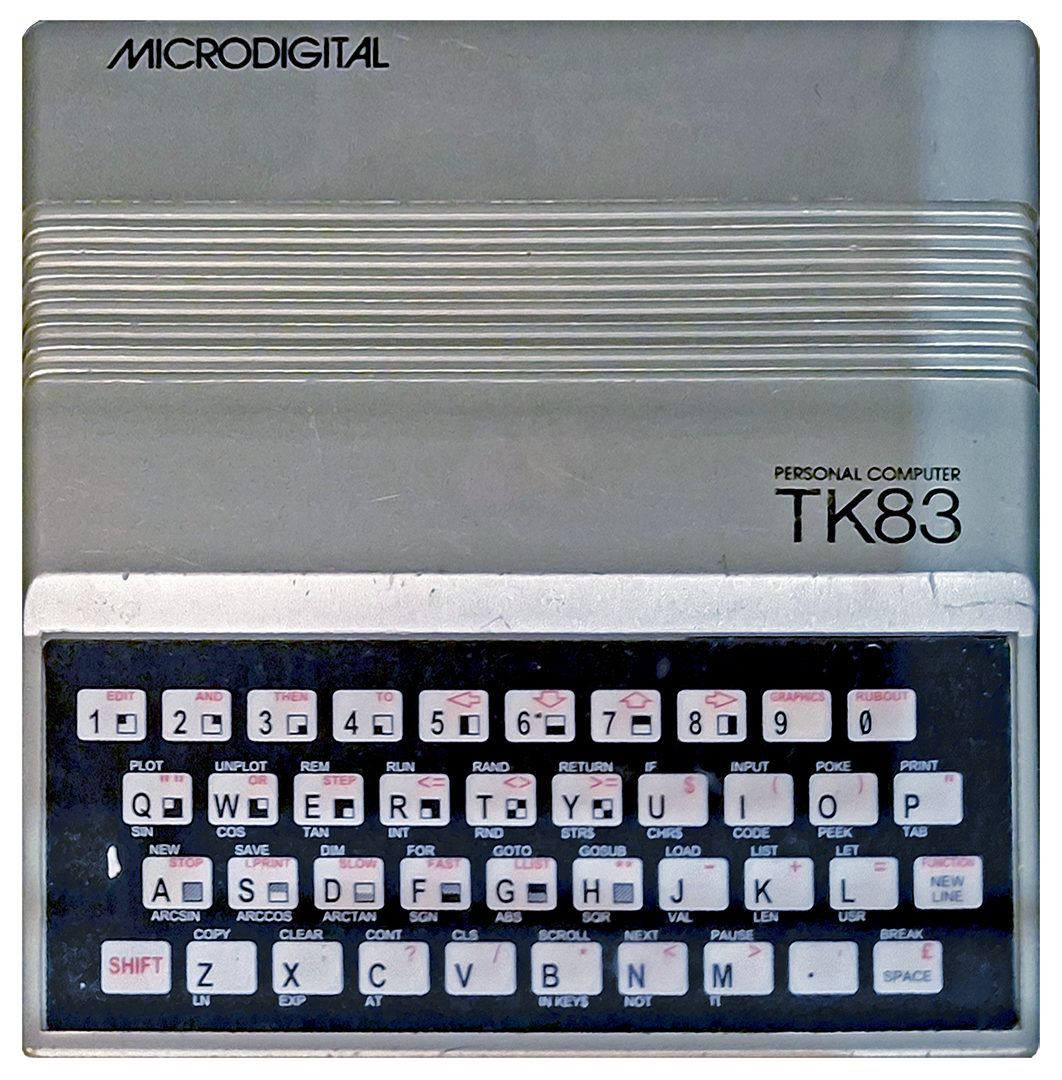
TK83

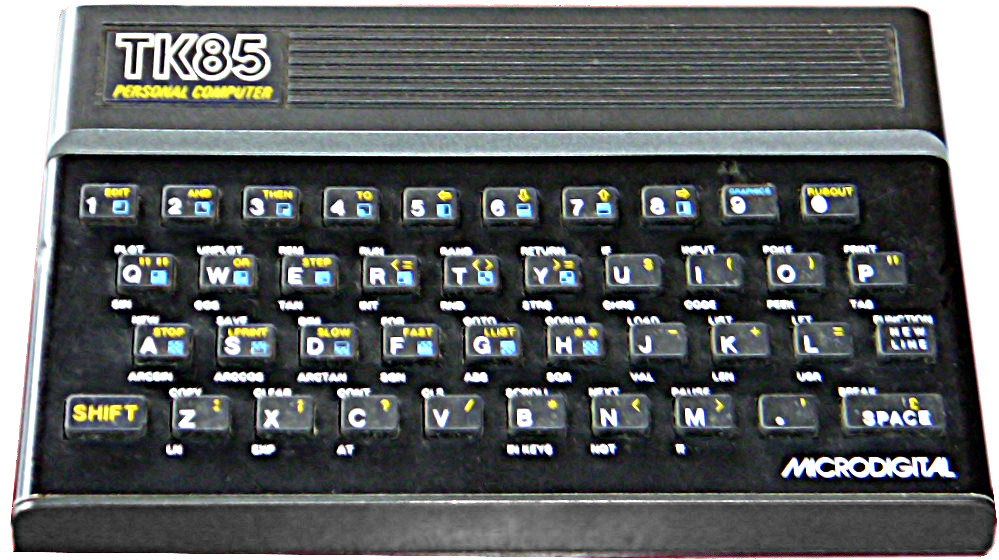
TK85

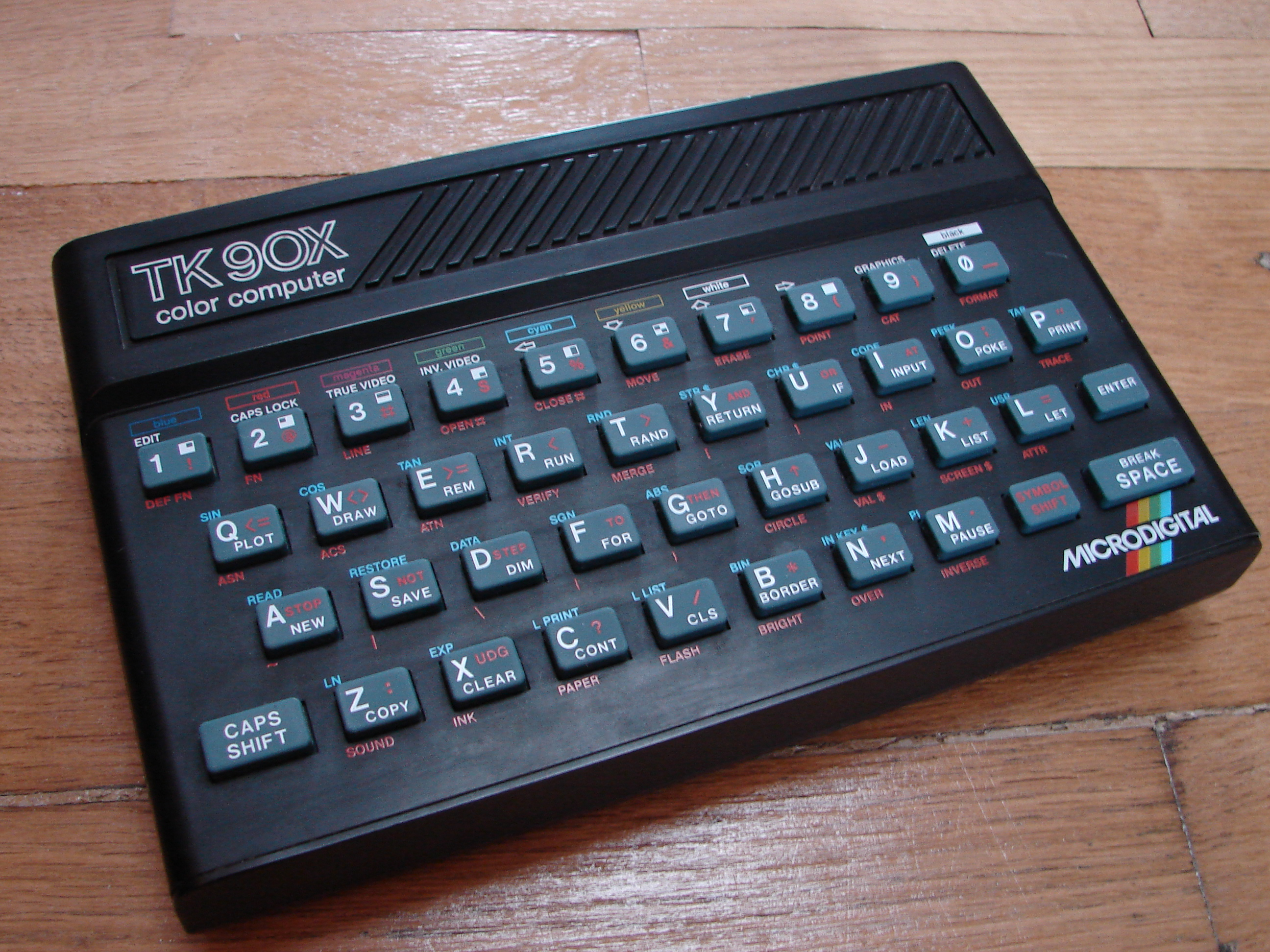
TK90X

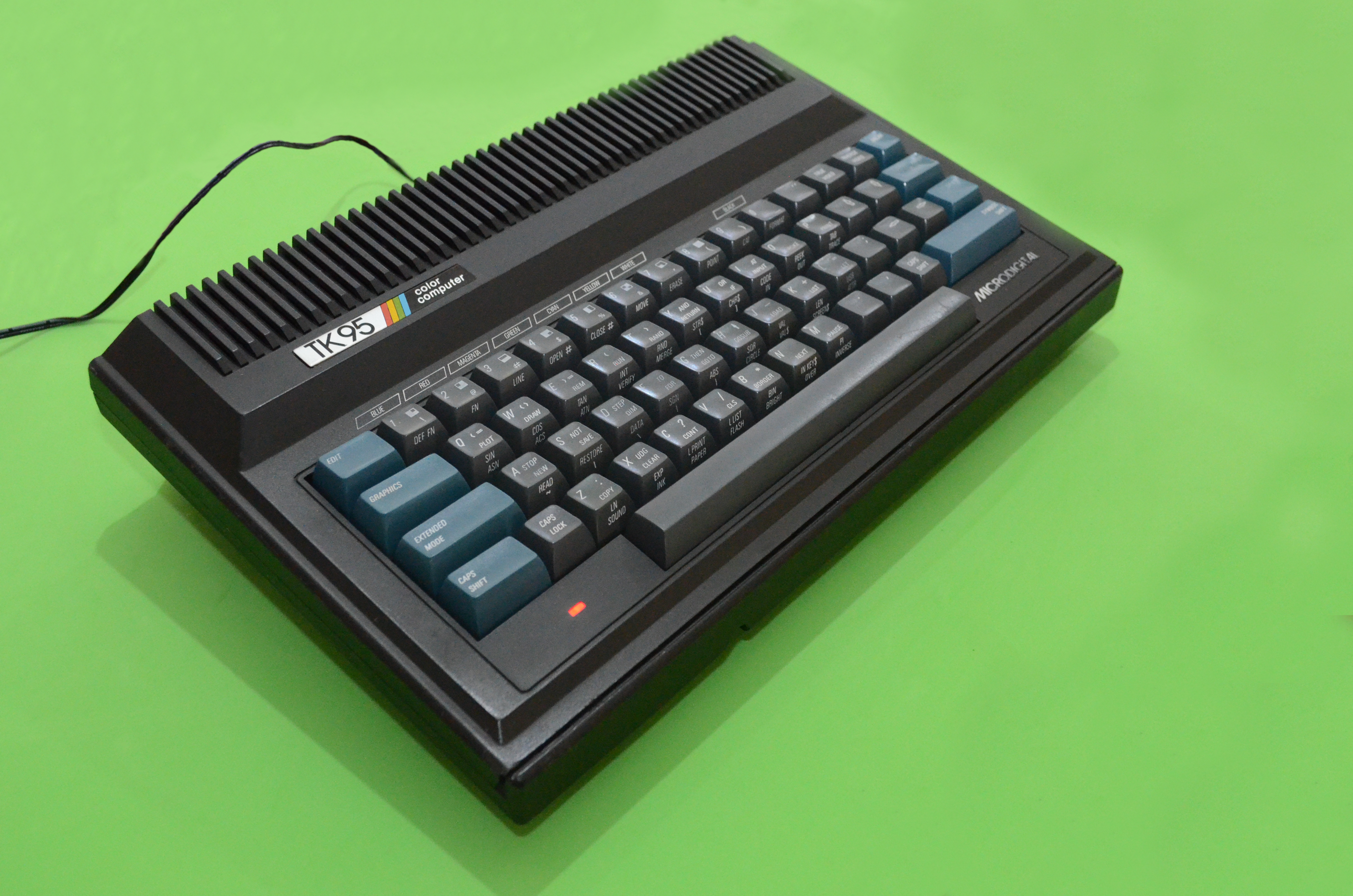
TK95

=== Personal computers ===
- TK 2000 (1984)
- TK 2000/II (1985)
- TK-3000 IIe (1986)
- TK-3000 IIe Compact (1987)
- TK EXTended (1987)
- LT 1600 D (?)
- TK Portable (?)
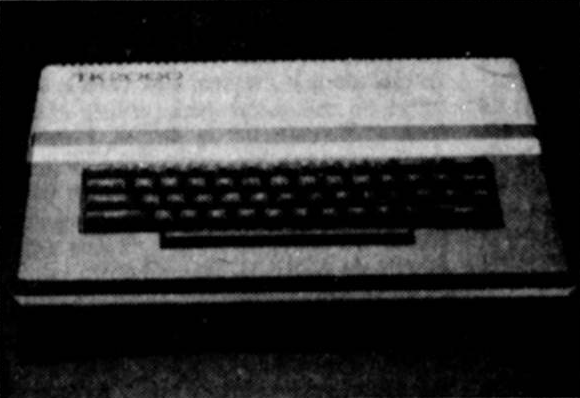
TK 2000

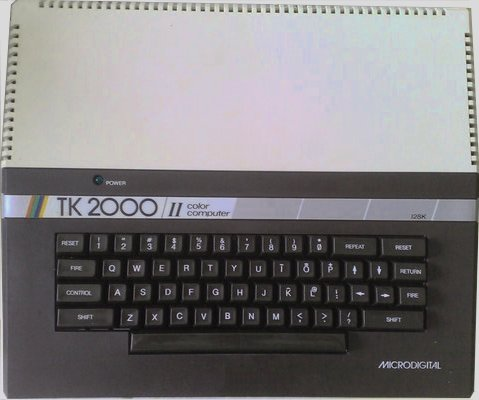
TK 2000 II 128 KB

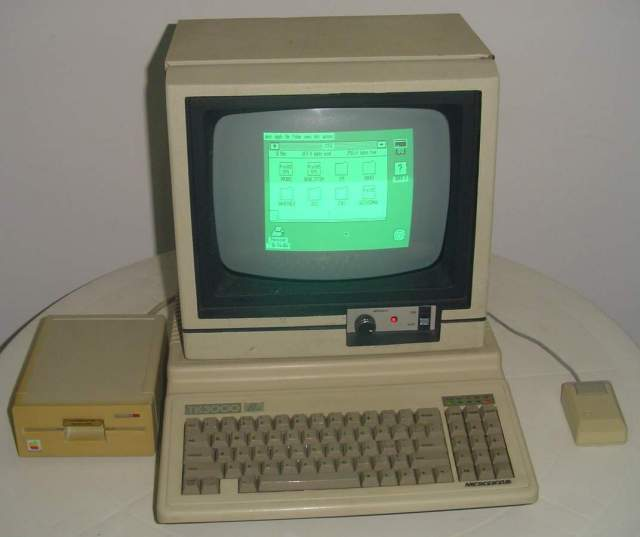
TK-3000 IIe with green phosphor display, 5.25" disk drive and Apple mouse

=== Peripherals ===
- TK Printer (vapourware)

=== Video-games ===
- Onyx (1984)- Colecovision clone, never launched
- Onyx Jr (1985)

=== Software ===
Microdigital sold software (almost always pirate copies of foreign programs) through its subsidiary, Microsoft.

=== Others ===
- Microdigital Rhythmic 2 Portable Keyboard
