= ZX80 character set =

Character set

Sinclair ZX80 character set
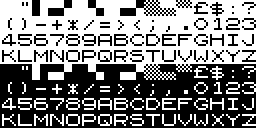
- The Sinclair ZX80 character set rendered in the system font.
- Language: English with pseudographics
- Created by: Sinclair Research
- Succeeded by: ZX81 character set
- Other related encoding: ZX Spectrum character set

The ZX80 character set is the character encoding used by the Sinclair Research ZX80 microcomputer with its original integer-only 4K BASIC ROM version of Sinclair BASIC. The encoding uses one byte per character for 256 code points. It has no relationship with previously established ones like ASCII or EBCDIC, but it is related though not identical to the character set of the successor ZX81.

== Printable characters ==
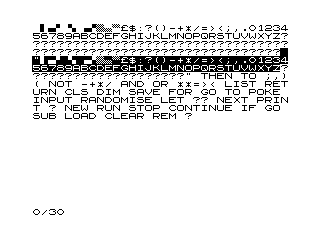
Screenshot of a ZX80 4K BASIC program that demonstrates all code points including BASIC keywords and nonprintable characters, the latter rendered as question marks except CHR$(1) rendered as a null string. Therefore the top line covers the 33 code points 0–32, the following 5 lines cover 32 each, and the last lines with keywords cover yet fewer.

The character set has 64 unique glyphs present at code points 0–63. With the most significant bit set the character is generated in inverse video; corresponding to code points 128–191. These 128 values are the only displayable ones allowed in the video memory (known as the display file). The remaining code points (64–127 and 192–255) are used as control characters or Sinclair BASIC keywords, while some are unused.

The small effective range of only 64 unique glyphs has led to the exclusion of many characters, including Latin lower case letters and symbols used widely in computing such as the exclamation mark and the at sign.

There are 11 block graphics characters, counting code point 0 which also doubles as space. Together with their 11 inverse video versions these 22 code points provide every combination of the character cell divided into 2×2 black-and-white block pixels for low-resolution 64×48 pixel graphics, or into 1×2 black, white or dithered gray wide block pixels for a 32×48 resolution. The 2×2 versions of these are also present in the Block Elements Unicode block.

Code point 1 is the double-quote " character when used in the display file, but uniquely to the ZX80 it is used internally as the string terminator character so the BASIC function CHR$(1) returns a null string; CHR$(212) translates to the printable " character.

== Changes in the 8K BASIC ROM (and the ZX81) ==
The floating-point 8K BASIC ROM of the follow-up ZX81 model was also available as an upgrade for the ZX80, replacing its integer-only 4K BASIC ROM and effectively upgrading the ZX80 to a FAST mode only ZX81. It introduced the modified ZX81 character set which has mostly the same code points, e.g. for A-Z and 0-9, but the code points are different for the block graphics characters, the symbols ", -, +, *, /, =, >, <, and the BASIC keyword tokens (with many new added). There are also changes to the control characters and code point 1 is no longer an unprintable string terminator.

In the later ZX Spectrum the entire character encoding for its version of Sinclair BASIC was replaced with the ZX Spectrum character set, which is a derivative of ASCII and includes lower case letters and more.

== System font ==
The ZX80 system font uses an 8×8 pixel-per-character grid where most glyphs fit in 7×6 pixels leaving one pixel horizontal space between them. This font was modified in the ZX81's ROM to slightly narrower 6×6 pixel glyphs with two pixels horizontal space between them, which improved the appearance of stand-alone inverted words and characters by showing inverted pixels on both sides, not just on the left side. Some glyphs also received a different design in the ZX81 system font, noticeable on the *, the slashed and no longer hexagonal number 0, and the less rounded $, C, G and J.

== Character set ==
The following table shows the ZX80 character set. Each character is shown with a potential Unicode equivalent. Space and control characters are represented by the abbreviations for their names.

ZX80 character set (Note: The ZX80 Operating Manual has an error and shows the > and < symbols in the wrong order.)
	0	1	2	3	4	5	6	7	8	9	A	B	C	D	E	F
0x	SP	" (Note: Code point 1 is the double-quote (") symbol when used in the video memory (called the display file), but it is used internally as the string terminator character so CHR$(1) returns a null string. Code point 212, CHR$(212), translates to the printable " character.)								(Note: Because they are 50% gray rasters, code points 9 and 137 have the same appearance although every pixel is inverted.)			£	$	:	?
1x	(	)	-	+	*	/	=	>	<	;	,	.	0	1	2	3
2x	4	5	6	7	8	9	A	B	C	D	E	F	G	H	I	J
3x	K	L	M	N	O	P	Q	R	S	T	U	V	W	X	Y	Z
4x																
5x																
6x																
7x	UP	DOWN	LEFT	RIGHT	HOME	EDIT	NEL	rubout								
8x		"											£	$		?
9x	(	)	-	+		/	=	>	<		,	.	0	1	2	3
Ax	4	5	6	7	8	9	A	B	C	D	E	F	G	H	I	J
Bx	K	L	M	N	O	P	Q	R	S	T	U	V	W	X	Y	Z
Cx																
Dx					"	THEN	TO		,	)	(	NOT	-	+	*	/
Ex	AND	OR	** (Note: The raise to a power multi-character operator tokenized into a single-byte code point.)	=	>	<	LIST	RETURN	CLS	DIM	SAVE	FOR	GO TO	POKE	INPUT	RANDOMISE
Fx	LET			NEXT	PRINT		NEW	RUN	STOP	CONTINUE	IF	GO SUB	LOAD	CLEAR	REM	

Sinclair BASIC tokenizes keywords into single-byte code points.

== See also ==
- ZX81 character set
- ZX Spectrum character set
- Sinclair QL character set
- ATASCII
- Atari ST character set
- PETSCII
- Extended ASCII
