= YS MegaBasic =

- Developer: Mike Leaman
- Initial release: 1984; 42 years ago
- Stable release: YSMegaBasicV4.0 / 1985; 41 years ago
- Operating system: ZX Spectrum
- Type: BASIC programming language interpreter
- License: Proprietary

YS MegaBasic is a BASIC programming language interpreter for the 1982 Sinclair Research ZX Spectrum microcomputer, written by Mike Leaman. The interpreter was available by mail-order from Your Spectrum magazine, hence the name "YS MegaBasic".

When loaded it left the user 22K of usable memory. YS MegaBasic allowed keywords to be spelled out letter-for-letter, which was quicker if the user had fitted a full-size full-travel keyboard to their machine, a very popular modification for serious users. This also removed the necessity for memorising the sometimes arcane key combinations necessary to enter less-commonly-used Sinclair BASIC keywords. It also featured three different font sizes, user definable keys, copy-and-paste, a Sinclair QL-like windowing system, sprites and sound effects.

== YS MegaBasic New commands ==
New commands added by YS MegaBasic:

AUTO	Causes the computer to automatically produce line numbers
BACKUP	Copies tape files
CHANGE	Manipulates the attributes file
CLW	Clears the current window on-screen
CURRENT	Changes the window used for screen output
DELETE	Erases a block of program lines
DOWN	Prints a string down the screen
EDIT	Displays a program line for editing
EXAMINE	Displays headers of tape files
FADE	Produces special effects on-screen
FONT	Selects the character set used for printing
FX	Handles miscellaneous functions
INVERT	Changes INK to PAPER and vice versa
KEY	Creates user-defined keys
MODE	Changes the current character size
MON	Jumps to front panel
PAN	Scrolls a window to the left or right, pixel by pixel
PLAY	Produces complex sound effects
RESTART	Equivalent to ON ERROR GO TO
SPEED	Used in conjunction with TRON to reduce the speed of program execution
SWAP	Swaps one attribute for another
TROFF	Turns 'trace' mechanism off
TRON	Turns 'trace' mechanism on
VDU	Equivalent to PRINT CHR$
WINDOW	Defines the size and location of the current window on-screen

== Releases ==
- YSMegaBasic V1.0 - 1984
- YSMegaBasic V1.1 - 1984
- YSMegaBasic V1.1 Sprite Designer - 1984
- YSMegaBasic V3.0 - 1985
- YSMegaBasic V4.0 - 1985
