= TK90X =

Brazilian ZX Spectrum clone made in 1985 by Microdigital Electrônica

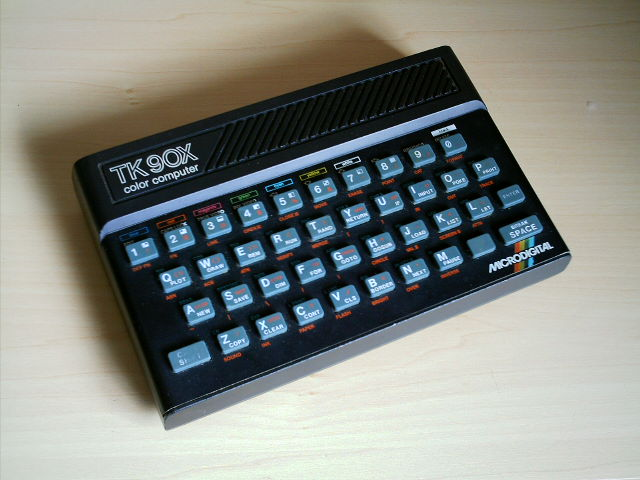
- Manufacturer: Microdigital Eletrônica
- Type: Home computer
- Released: 1985; 41 years ago
- Operating system: Sinclair BASIC
- CPU: Zilog Z80A @ 3.58 MHz
- Memory: 16KB or 48KB RAM
- Display: TV RF output (VHF channel 3), PAL-M, PAL-N, NTSC, 256 x 192, 15 colours
- Graphics: CMOS IC
- Sound: Single channel 1-bit DAC
- Backward compatibility: ZX Spectrum
- Successor: TK95

The TK90X was a Brazilian ZX Spectrum clone made in 1985 by Microdigital Electrônica, a company from São Paulo, that had previously manufactured ZX80 (TK80, TK82) and ZX81 clones (TK82C, TK83 and TK85).

Reported TK90X sales in October 1986 were 2500 machines per month.

== Technical details ==
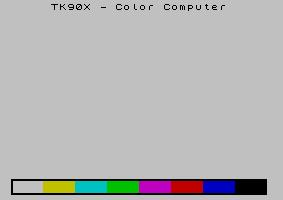
TK90X boot screen

The case was a little taller than the original Spectrum and the keyboard placement was equal to the original keyboard, except for some additional Sinclair BASIC commands that did not exist in the Spectrums (UDG for user defined characters in the place of the £ sign - including specific Portuguese and Spanish characters such as ç and ñ, as well as accented vowels - and the Trace function).

There were two versions of the machine, with 16 and 48 KB of RAM. They contained the same Z80A processor running at 3.58 MHz, ROM chip and RAM chips (dynamic RAMs 4116 and 4416).

Microdigital reverse engineered a CMOS integrated circuit (IC) with similar functionality to the original bipolar IC ULA from Sinclair/Ferranti. Most software written for the Spectrum ran on the TK90X, with some minor incompatibilities.

The TV modulator was tuned to VHF channel 3, with the TV standard being hardware selectable to PAL-M (60 Hz) as used in Brazil, PAL-N (50 Hz) as used in Uruguay, Argentina and Paraguay and NTSC (60 Hz) as used in USA and many other countries.

An improvement over the original ZX Spectrum was the sound output via modulated RF direct to the TV set instead of the internal beeper.

=== Peripherals ===
Three peripherals were released by Microdigital: a joystick, a light pen interface and a parallel printer interface.

A Beta Disc Interface was available by third party companies, called 'C.A.S. disk drive interface' (a near-clone from the original Beta Disc interface), 'C.B.I. disk drive interface' (with an included printer interface) and 'IDS91' (with an included printer interface made by Synchron) or 'IDS2001ne' (also with an included printer interface made by Synchron, but exclusively compatible with the TK90X and TK95).

== TK95 ==
The TK90X was replaced by the TK95, which had a different keyboard and case (identical to the Commodore Plus4), while the circuit board and schematics remained unchanged (the motherboard was marked as TK90X). It also used the same ULA as the TK90X, with only digital logic ports and the analogue part outside the ULA chip.

This machine had a few ROM differences that made it more compatible with the original ZX Spectrum (e.g., the game Mikie runs only on the TK95, not on the TK90X). Some users created a switch the enabled choosing between the original TK90X, TK95 or ZX Spectrum ROM internally, in order to be able to run all of the Spectrum's software.

== Export model ==
During the 1980s Brazilians were not allowed to import computers due to local laws forbidding imports of computers at the time and therefore the TK90X became the first affordable color computer in the market. It was successful in other Latin American countries, such as Uruguay and Argentina, as an export model using a different circuit board and schematics, and the same Ferranti ULA as the ZX Spectrum.

Because of its affordability in Latin America, many commercial software programs were developed locally for small business use and millions of users had their first computer experience with the TK90.

There are active websites used by enthusiasts of this computer discussing software preservation, peripherals and homebrew development and modifications.
