= TK80 =

ZX80 clone made by Microdigital Eletrônica in 1981

- Manufacturer: Microdigital Eletrônica
- Type: Home computer
- Released: Brazil: 1981; 45 years ago
- Introductory price: Cr$ 68,850 (1KB RAM), Cr$ 73,650 (2KB RAM)
- Media: Cassette tape
- Operating system: 4K BASIC
- CPU: Z80A @ 3.25 MHz
- Memory: 1 or 2 KB
- Display: Monochrome TV out; 24 lines × 32 characters or 64 × 48 block graphics mode
- Backward compatibility: ZX80
- Successor: TK82

The TK80 was a home computer produced by Microdigital Eletrônica. A clone of the Sinclair ZX80, it was introduced along with the TK82 in 1981 during the "I Feira Internacional de Informática". There were two versions, one with 1 KB RAM costing Cr$ 68,850 and another with 2 KB costing Cr$73,650.

In the January 1982 issue of Micro Sistemas magazine, Tomas Roberto Kovari, Microdigital's engineer, stated that the machines were being sold with a photocopied manual, while a printed version was being developed. Kovari estimated a potential market for 10000 machines in Brazil, with expected buyers being novelty seekers, students and self employed professionals.

According to some sources, the TK80 was never commercially produced, with only prototypes existing.

== Specifications ==
Specifications were similar to the original machine:

- CPU: Z80A @ 3.25 MHz
- Memory: ROM: 4 KiB; RAM: 1 or 2 KiB
- Keyboard: 40 keys membrane keyboard
- Display: 32 × 22 text; 64 × 44 semigraphics
- Expansion: 1 slot
- Outputs: 1 TV out (RF modulator, channel 3); cassette tape recorder audio in/out
- Storage: Cassette tape (300 bauds)
