= TK 2000 =

Brazilian Apple II Plus clone made in 1984 by Microdigital Electrônica

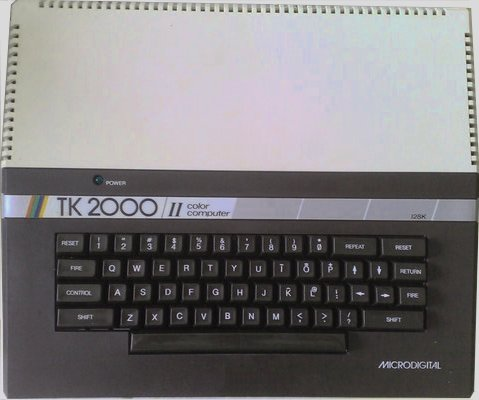
- TK 2000 II Color Computer
- Also known as: TK 2000 Color Computer, TK 2000 II Color Computer
- Manufacturer: Microdigital Eletrônica
- Type: Personal computer
- Released: 1984; 42 years ago
- Discontinued: 1987; 39 years ago
- Operating system: Applesoft BASIC compatible, TKDOS 3.3 (Apple DOS 3.3 compatible)
- CPU: MOS Technology 6502 @ 1,02 MHz
- Memory: 64KB (expandable to 128KB)
- Removable storage: Floppy Disks, Audio Cassette
- Display: RF TV out or RGB; 40×24 text; 280×192 graphics; 8 colors
- Sound: Beeper

The TK 2000 microcomputer, produced by the Brazilian company Microdigital Eletrônica Ltda, was presented to the public during the 1983 Computer Fair and launched in 1984. It was a clone of the Microprofessor II manufactured by Multitech. Based on the 6502 CPU, the machine was partially compatible with Apple II Plus software and hardware. Some software was developed specifically for the machine, including productivity programs and games.

In 1985 the TK2000/II was released and in 1987 the machine was discontinued.

== Details ==
- CPU - MOS Technology 6502 at 1,02 MHz
- Memory - 16 KB ROM, 64 KB RAM (expandable to 128KB)
- Sound - one channel, up to 4 octaves with tones and semitones, 5 different tempos for each note, by software.
- Video - 280 x 192 with 8 colors, low-resolution mode emulates 16 colors through dithering.
- Keyboard - mechanical, 54 keys with QWERTY layout.
- Expansion - 1 slot
- Interfaces / Ports - TV output, RGB monitor, printer, joystick
- Storage - cassette recorder (1500 baud), external 5¼ floppy drive (140 Kb, double density)
- Operating system - BASIC, TKDOS 3.3 ( Apple DOS 3.3 compatible)

== Models ==
=== TK 2000 Color Computer ===
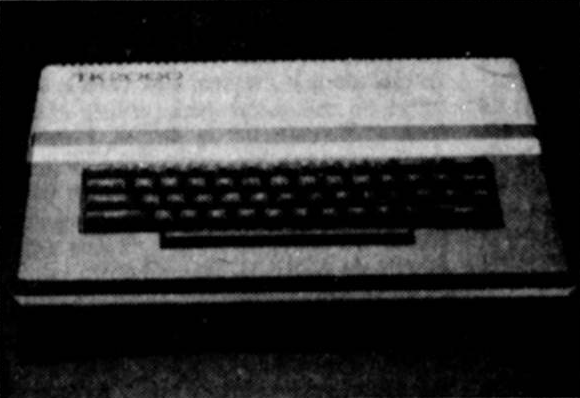
TK 2000 Color

This is the initial 1984 model.

=== TK 2000/II Color Computer ===
A 1985 rebranding of the initial model.

=== TK 2000/II Color Computer 128Kb ===
This version adds a 64KB memory expansion, totaling 128KB, compatible with the Saturn memory expansion standard. Two hardware revisions of this model are known: TD112 with a satellite board, mounted next to the main board and connected to the main board via auxiliary wiring and TD122 with all components consolidated on a single board.

== See also ==
- Microprofessor II
