= TK85 =

ZX81 clone made by Microdigital Eletrônica in 1983

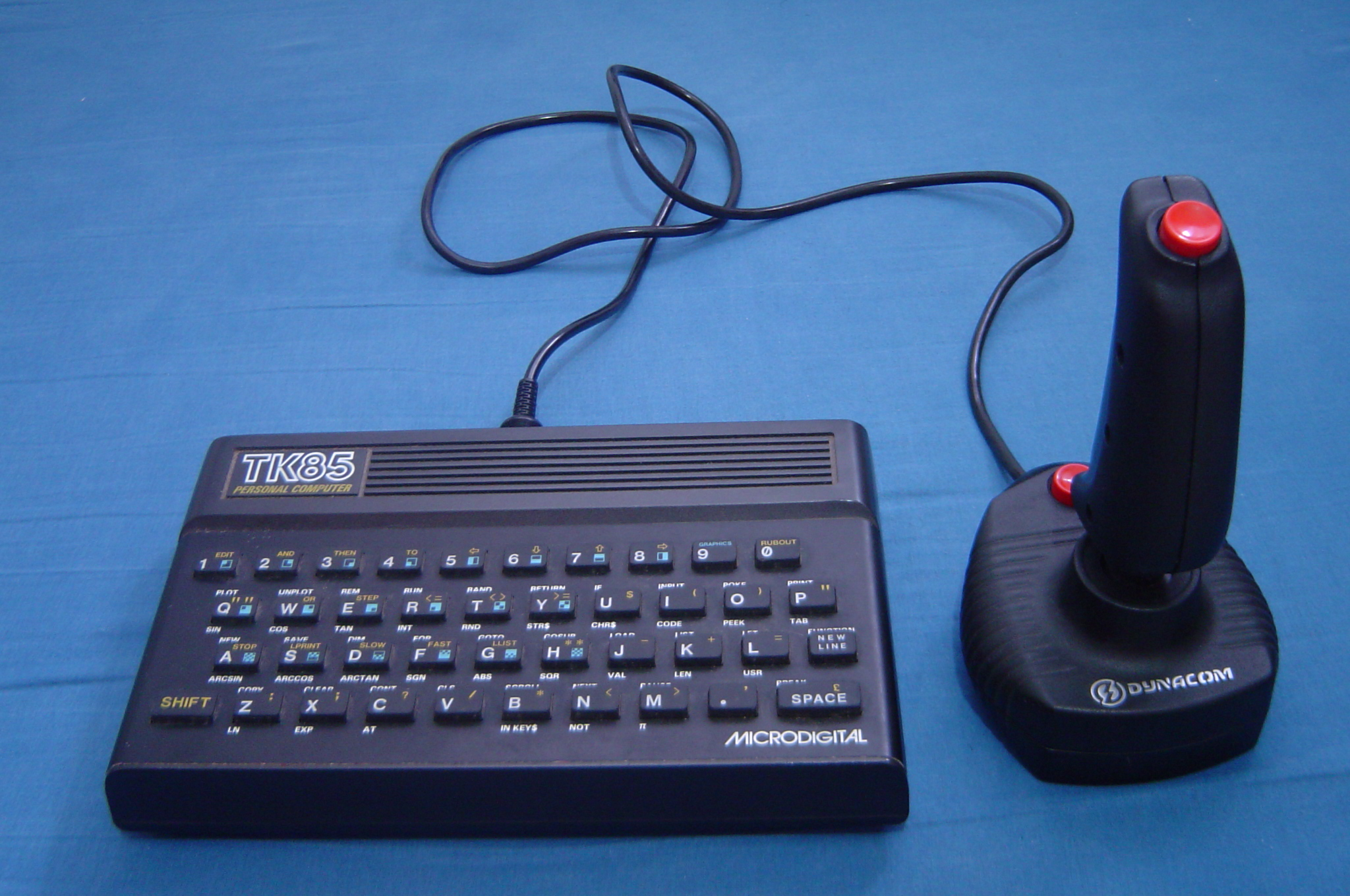
- TK85 with joystick
- Developer: Microdigital Eletrônica
- Manufacturer: Microdigital Eletrônica
- Type: Home computer
- Released: 1983; 43 years ago
- Operating system: 8K Sinclair BASIC
- CPU: Z80 @ 3.25 MHz
- Memory: 16 or 48 KB
- Removable storage: External Compact Cassette recorder at 300 or 4200 bps
- Display: Monochrome display on television; 24 lines × 32 characters or 64 × 48 pixels graphics mode
- Graphics: Discrete logic circuits
- Power: 9V DC
- Backward compatibility: ZX81
- Predecessor: TK83
- Successor: TK90X

The TK85 was a ZX81 clone made by Microdigital Eletrônica, a computer company located in Brazil. It came with 16 or 48 KB RAM, and had a ZX Spectrum–style case, similar to a Timex Sinclair 1500.

Unlike the ZX81, the TK85 used standard logic components rather than a gate array ("ULA"), and during manufacture several of them were scraped so that competitors couldn't easily copy the circuit. The circuit board had space for a AY-3-8912 sound generator chip (compatible with the ZonX-81 sound board), and although none came factory installed, it is possible to add the necessary circuits.

The TK85 came with a copy of the 8K ZX81 floating point BASIC, and an additional 2K EPROM, mapped to addresses 8192–10240, containing machine code routines for use with tape files. These routines could save with HISAVE, load with HILOAD and verify with HIVERIFY in "Hi-Speed" (4200 bit/s); save and load, BASIC variables in 300 bit/s (standard ZX81 speed) using SAVE and DLOAD functions and 4200 bit/s (Hi-Speed) using DHSAVE and DHLOAD. These routines were all accessible using RAND USR commands. The save to variable function could be used to make copies of programs on tape.

The expansion port on the back of the computer is compatible with the ZX81, although some peripherals may not work due to conflicts with the 2K of extra ROM.

The rear of the computer featured a TV output (without video back porch), "EAR" and "MIC" sockets for connecting to an external tape recorder, a joystick port using a DIN socket (that simulated the 5,6,7,8 and 0 keys), a ZX81 compatible expansion port, space for a sound output socket, and a socket for the 9V external power supply.

Since the joystick used the cursor keys, and due to the circuitry for the keyboard, it wasn't possible to detect diagonal directions correctly.
