= TK95 =

Brazilian ZX Spectrum clone made in 1986 by Microdigital Electrônica

TK 95
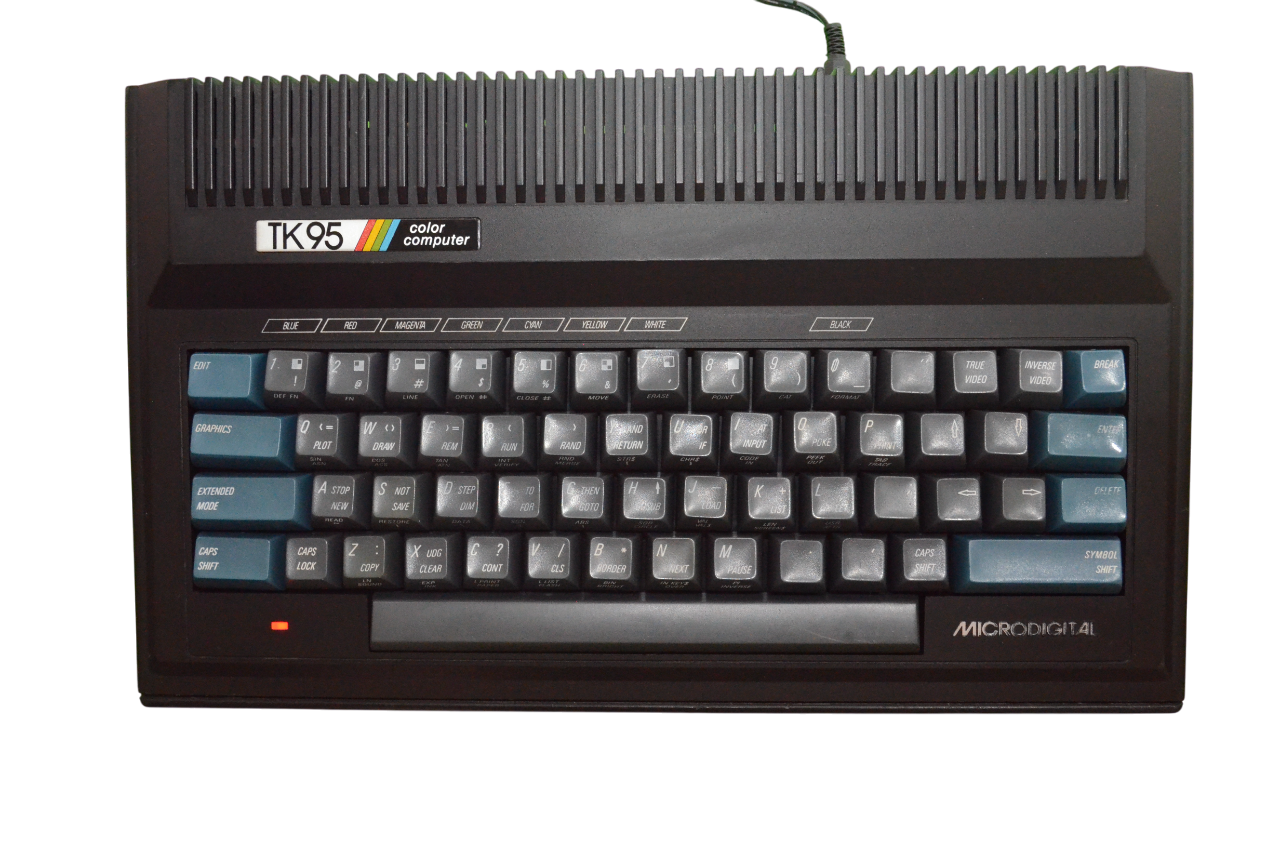
- Brazilian clone of ZX Spectrum
- Manufacturer: Microdigital Eletrônica
- Type: Home computer
- Released: 1986; 40 years ago
- Introductory price: Cz$ 4559
- Operating system: Sinclair BASIC
- CPU: Zilog Z80B @ 3.5 MHz
- Memory: 48 KB RAM
- Removable storage: Cassette tape
- Display: TV RF out (VHF channel 3), PAL-M, 256 x 192, 15 colours
- Graphics: Custom IC
- Sound: Beeper
- Backward compatibility: ZX Spectrum
- Predecessor: TK90X

The TK 95 microcomputer was a 1986 ZX Spectrum clone by Microdigital Eletrônica, a company located at São Paulo, Brazil. It was an evolution of the TK90X introduced the previous year.

The case was redesigned (copied from the Plus/4) and the keyboard was said to be "semi-professional" (according to the Brazilian manufacturer), with the addition of some Sinclair BASIC commands that did not exist in the ZX Spectrum's basic set (for user-defined characters – UDG), and better compatibility with the original ZX Spectrum (compared to the TK90X).

Like the Spectrum, the machine had 48 kilobytes of RAM. Inside, it had the same processor: Z80A running at 3.58 MHz, a 16 KB ROM chip and some RAM chips (old dynamic rams 4116 and 4416). Microdigital did some reverse engineering to develop a chip with the functions of the original ULA from Sinclair/Ferranti. The modulator was tuned to VHF channel 3 and the TV system was PAL-M (60 Hz). The cassette interface ran at a faster speed than the Spectrum.

Only two peripherals were released by Microdigital – a light pen interface and a parallel printer interface. Other companies in Brazil released clone versions of Interface 1 joysticks (Atari 2600-compatibles) and interfaces for 5¼" PC drives (360 KB). The games had questionable legality being close to copies of the originals and the fans of the ZX Spectrum computer in Brazil were counted in tens of thousands.
