= Description error =

Human error due to insufficient information

A description error or selection error is an error, or more specifically a human error, that occurs when a person performs the correct action on the wrong object due to insufficient specification of an action which would have led to a desired result. This commonly happens when similar actions lead to different results. A typical example is a panel with rows of identical switches, where it is easy to carry out a correct action (flip a switch) on a wrong switch due to their insufficient differentiation.

This error can be very disorienting and usually causes a brief loss of situation awareness or automation surprise if noticed right away. But much worse, if it goes unnoticed, it could cause more serious problems. So allowances such as clearly highlighting a selected item should be made in interaction design.

Donald Norman describes the subject in his book The Design of Everyday Things. There he describes how user-centered design can help account for human limitations that can lead to errors like description errors. James Reason also covers the subject in his book Human Error.
