= Reverse video =

Display technique with inverted colors

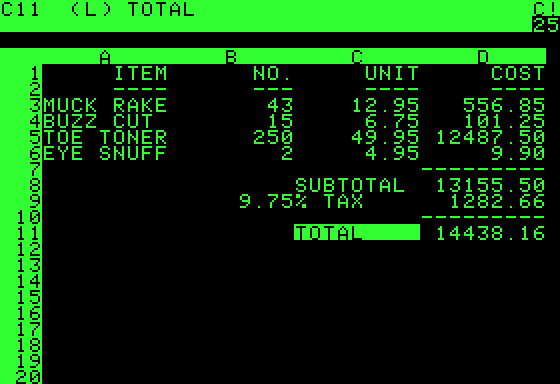
Example with normally light text: Visicalc displays column and row headers in reverse video. The "TOTAL" label is also reversed.

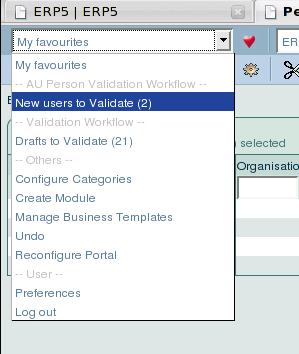
Example with normally dark text: ERP5 displays the current selection in a drop-down list in reverse video.

Reverse video (or invert video or inverse video or reverse screen) is a computer display technique whereby the background and text color values are inverted. On older computers, displays were usually designed to display text on a black background by default. For emphasis, the color scheme was swapped to bright background with dark text. Nowadays the two tend to be switched, since most modern computers default to white as a background color. The opposite of reverse video is known as true video.

Video is usually reversed by inverting the brightness values of the pixels of the involved region of the display. If there are 256 levels of brightness, encoded as 0 to 255, the 255 value becomes 0 and vice versa. A value of 1 becomes 254, 2 of 253, and so on: n is swapped for r - n, for r levels of brightness. This is occasionally called a ones' complement. If the source image is of middle brightness, reverse video can be difficult to see, 127 becomes 128 for example, which is only a difference of one level of brightness. The computer displays where it was most commonly used were monochrome and only showed two values so this issue rarely arose.

Reverse video is commonly used in software programs to highlight a selection that has been made as a visual aid in preventing description errors, where an action is performed on an object which is not the one intended. It is more common in modern desktop environments to change the background to other colors such as blue, or to use a semi-transparent background to "highlight" the selected text.

On a terminal understanding ANSI escape sequences, the reverse video function is activated using the escape sequence CSI 7 m (which equals SGR 7).

== Accessibility ==
Reverse video is also sometimes used for accessibility reasons. When most computer displays were light-on-dark, it was found that users looking back and forth between a white paper and dark screen would experience eyestrain due to their pupils constantly dilating and contracting. Flicker was also an issue with early white-background displays. Today, people with visual impairments such as ocular toxocariasis may find it less tiring to the eyes to work with a mainly black screen, since modern operating systems usually display a lot of white in a normal use. For the same, white-dominant reason, reverse video is an efficient way to read or write text in a dark environment, since the darkness of the screen may blend into the darkness of the environment.

A number of operating systems, graphical programs, and websites offer dark modes, which serves a similar purpose as what was originally true video and is now reverse video in modern systems.
