= DB9 =

DB9 or DB-9 may refer to:

- Aston Martin DB9, a grand tourer made by Aston Martin
- Darren Bent, English football forward who wears the number 9 shirt for Aston Villa F.C.
- DB9 (yacht), a superyacht built by Palmer Johnson in 2010
- DE-9 connector, a common type of D-subminiature electrical connector, widely referred to as "DB-9" even though that is a different sized connector.
  - Atari joystick port, known as the "DB-9" or "DB9", classic video game controller port made popular for game consoles and home computers mainly through the 1980s and ‘90s
- Dimitar Berbatov, Bulgarian football manager, who previously played as a forward for Fulham F.C. wearing a number 9 shirt
