= Sanam =

Sanam may refer to:

== Places ==
- Sanam, Iran, a village in Iran
- Sanam, Niger, a commune in Niger
- Sanam, Sudan, a village in Sudan

== Entertainment ==
- Sanam (1951 film), a 1951 Bollywood romantic film
- Sanam (1997 film), a 1997 Hindi drama film
- Sanam (TV series), 2016 Pakistani TV series
- Sanam (dance), music and dance of the Uyghur people
- Sanam (band), Indian band
- "Sanam Sanam", a song by Shaan and Shraddha Pandit from the 2012 Indian film Mere Dost Picture Abhi Baki Hai

== People ==
- Sanam Baloch (born 1986), Pakistani television actress
- Sanam Chaudhry (born 1991), Pakistani actress
- Sanam Jung (born 1988), Pakistani television actress
- Sanam Khatibi (born 1979), Iranian-born Belgian visual artist
- Sanam Marvi (born 1986), Pakistani singer
- Sanam Puri, Indian singer
- Sanam Saeed (born 1984/85), Pakistani film and television actress

== Other uses ==
- Sanam (yacht), a 2015 super-yacht
- Southern Azerbaijan National Awakening Movement
- Sanam Tehran Sports Club
