= Betty Ryan =

American game developer and programmer

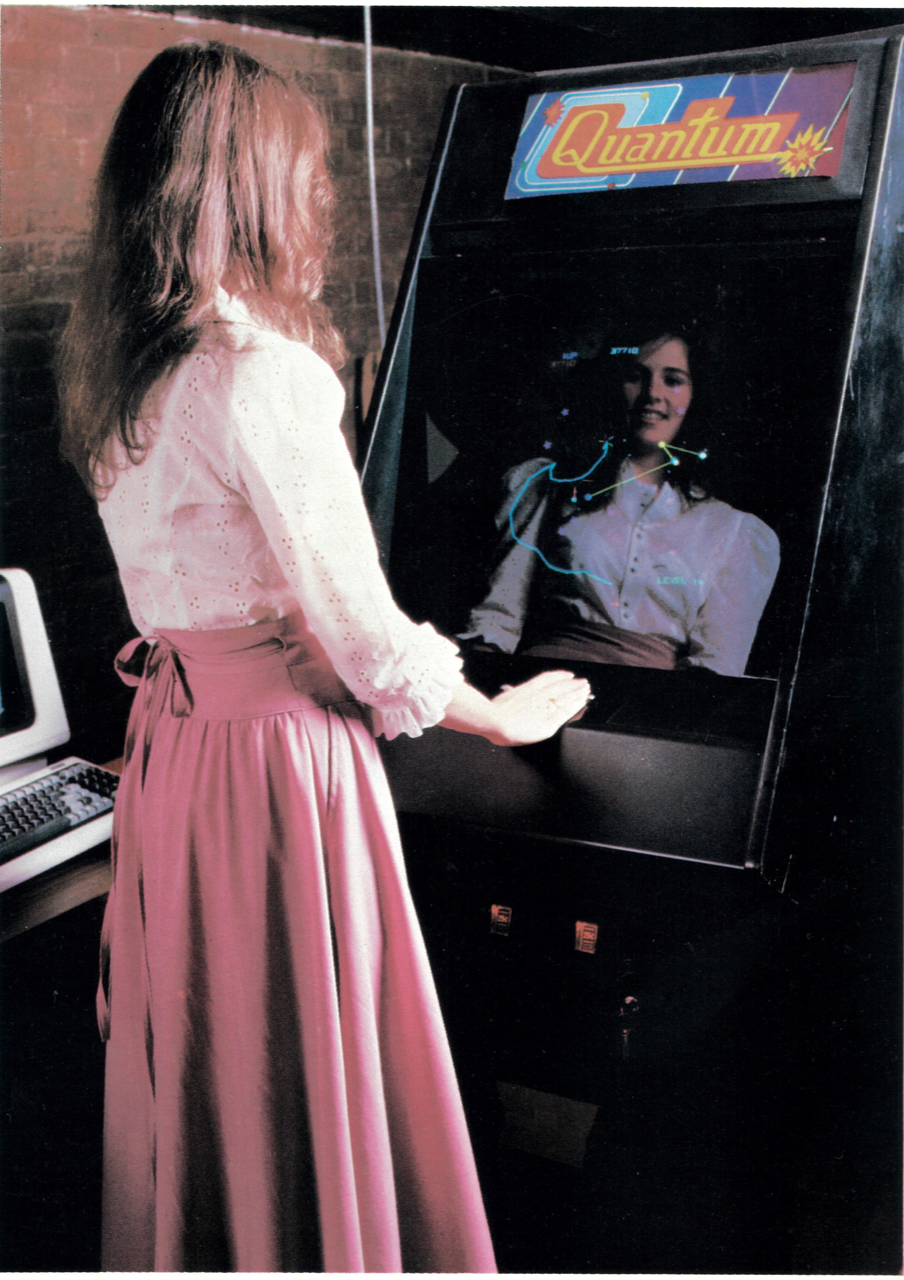
- Other names: Elizabeth Ryan; Betty Ryan Tylko
- Occupations: Programmer; Video game developer
- Known for: Quantum
- Children: 4

Betty Ryan is an American game developer and programmer. She worked for General Computer Corporation in the 1980s where she was its first female employee. She programmed the 1982 arcade video game Quantum which was published by Atari, Inc. in 1982, as well as working on games for the Atari 2600, Atari 5200, and Atari 7800.

== Early life and education ==
Ryan received a Bachelor of Arts in Engineering and Applied Sciences from Harvard University. She had four children.

== Career ==
Ryan joined General Computer Corporation in 1982, as its the ninth employee and first female employee. She programmed the arcade video game Quantum in her basement. Ryan worked on the Atari 5200 and Atari 7800 ports of Pole Position and Dig Dug. She also worked on the AtariLab educational software. Her sister, Carol Ryan Thomas, was hired later as a game tester and debugger. Ryan stopped working for General Computer Corporation after she gave birth to a daughter, the first of her four children.

Ryan has spoken about her work in game development for the American Classic Arcade Museum. Since 2003, she has been working in web development with John and William Tylko.

== Software ==
=== Video games ===
- Quantum (arcade, 1982)
- Pole Position (Atari 2600, 1982) port from arcade
- Dig Dug (1983) port from arcade
- Unreleased: Millipede (Atari 7800, 1983) port from arcade

=== Educational ===
- AtariLab (1983)

== Works cited ==
- Bjørn, Pernille; Rosner, Daniela (2022). "Intertextual Design: The Hidden Stories of Atari Women". Human-Computer Interaction. 37 (4). Taylor & Francis: 370–95. doi:10.1080/07370024.2020.1861947.
