= Quantum (video game) =

1982 video game

- Arcade flyer
- Developer: General Computer Corporation
- Publisher: Atari, Inc.
- Designer: Betty Ryan
- Composer: Patty Goodson
- Platform: Arcade
- Release: November 1982
- Genre: Action
- Mode: Single-player
- Arcade system: Atari Vector

Quantum is a color vector arcade video game developed at General Computer Corporation for Atari, Inc. and released in November 1982. It was designed by Betty Ryan, the first female developer at GCC. The premise of the game is related loosely to quantum physics; the player directs a probe with a trackball to encircle atomic "particles" for points, without touching various other particles. Once the particles are surrounded by the probe's tail they are destroyed.

== Gameplay ==
In each stage, the player moves a probe with the trackball, leaving a tail behind. As the attract-mode demo explains, the player must circle around and cross the tail to complete a loop. Any particles caught in a closed loop are destroyed. A level is completed by destroying all the nuclei (solid circular particles). The player also must avoid contact with any of the particles (except electrons, they are safe) as well as active (red) particle bonds. Otherwise, the scene collapses and destroys the probe. Besides the nuclei, other deadly particles may appear from time to time.

== High score table ==
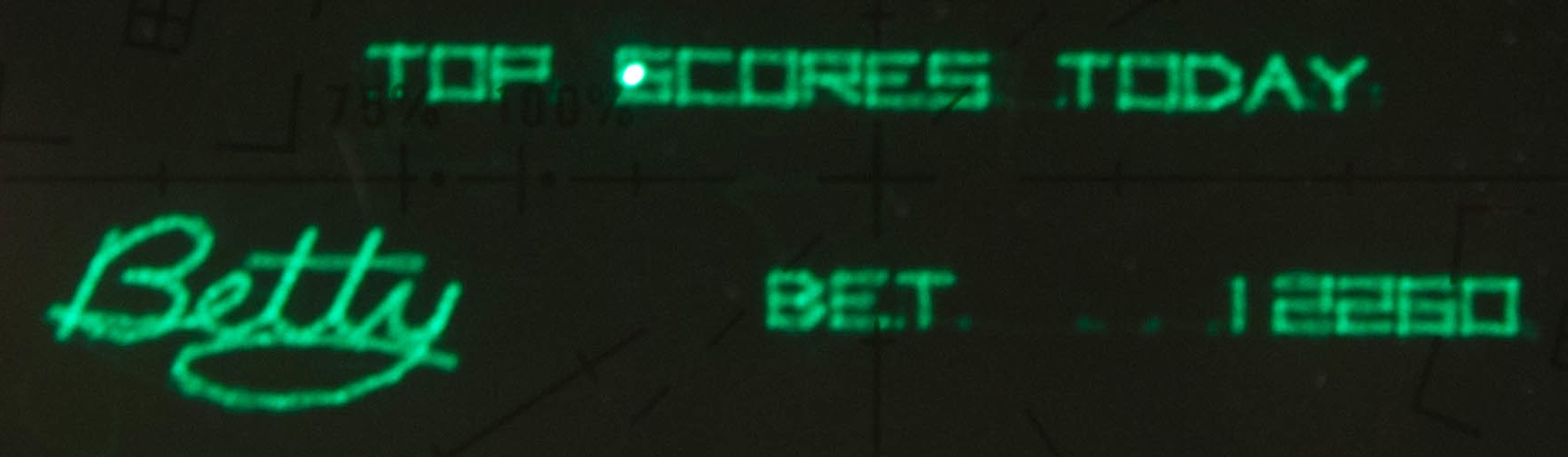
A legible high score signature

To enter initials for a high score, the player uses the trackball to circle letters in the same fashion used during gameplay. If the player achieves the highest score on the table, the initials screen is preceded by another on which adept players can use the trackball to draw their initials.

== Legacy ==
A screenshot of a clone called Tachyon was previewed in Atari 8-bit magazine ANALOG Computing, but the game was never completed.

A remake, Quantum Recharged, was released in August 2023 for the Nintendo Switch, PlayStation 4, PlayStation 5, Windows, Xbox One, and Xbox Series X/S. It is part of Atari SA's Recharged remake series.

== See also ==
- Disco No. 1
- Libble Rabble
