= Alexei Mordashov =

Russian businessman (born 1965)

Alexey Mordashov
- Алексей Мордашов
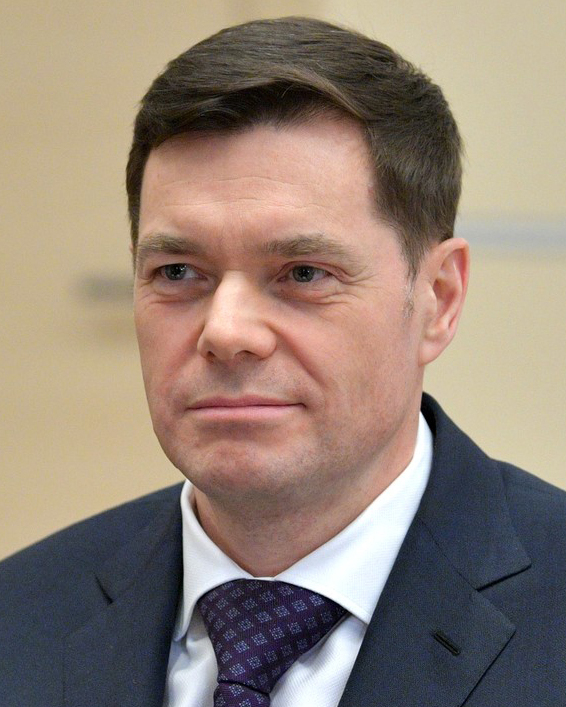
- Mordashov in 2018
- Born: 26 September 1965 (age 61); Cherepovets, Vologda Oblast, Soviet Union
- Education: Leningrad Engineering-Economical Institute (BEng, MEng); Northumbria University (MBA)
- Occupation: Businessman
- Known for: Majority shareholder of Severstal
- Spouses: Elena Mordashova (m. 1986; div. 1996) Elena Mordashova (divorced) (second wife also Elena): Marina Mordashova
- Children: 7
- Awards: Order of Alexander Nevsky; Order of Honour; Order of Merit of the Italian Republic (Commander); Order of Merit of the Grand Duchy of Luxembourg (Commander)

Alexey Alexandrovich Mordashov (Russian: Алексей Александрович Мордашов; born 26 September 1965) is a Russian businessman and oligarch. He is the main shareholder and chairman of Severstal, Russia's largest steel and mining company.

According to Forbes' The World's Billionaires list published on 10 March 2026, Alexey Mordashov returned to the top position among Russia's richest individuals, with an estimated net worth of approximately US$37 billion—marking his first time in that position since 2021. At the same time, according to the Bloomberg Billionaires Index (24 August 2026), Mordashov's net worth was estimated at US$29.1 billion, placing him 86th worldwide and first in Russia.

Mordashov was mentioned in the Panama Papers and FinCEN files leaks, in which it was revealed that a company associated with Mordashov paid for a number of Vladimir Putin's pet projects and gave generously to close associates of Putin.

Mordashov is under sanctions due to the Russian invasion of Ukraine. According to the European Union (EU), Rossiya Bank, in which Mordashov owns a financial stake, is the "personal bank" of the senior officials who benefitted from the 2014 annexation of Crimea. In November 2023, The New York Times reported as part of the Cyprus Confidential leak that accounts connected to him paid Hubert Seipel, a German author, to write a book about Putin.

== Early life ==
Mordashov is the son of Russian parents, who were both steel mill workers. His father was electrical engineer at the mill in Cherepovets. According to Mordashov, his family used welfare coupons, allowed only 200g of butter and 400g of sausages per month. He graduated with a bachelor's and master's degree in engineering from the Leningrad Engineering-Economical Institute, currently known as ENGECON. He later gained an MBA from Northumbria University in Newcastle upon Tyne, England, in 2001. In an address to students at the European University at Saint Petersburg, Mordashov spoke about his decision to study in Leningrad rather than Moscow and the value his undergraduate studies played in his search for employment and eventual career path. Returning to Cherepovets, he started his career by joining the same steel plant where his parents had worked.

== Career ==
=== Early career ===
In 1988 Mordashov joined 'Cherepovetskiy Metallurgical Plant' after graduation from Leningrad Engineering-Economical Institut as an economist. In December 1991, the Soviet Union dissolved. By 1992 he became finance director, shortly before the company was privatised. When the plant's elderly director instructed him to acquire shares to keep them out of the hands of an outsider, he formed two investment funds and, by buying up workers' shares, built a major stake in the factory. In 1996 he was appointed as CEO of the company. He went on to build a conglomerate, Severstal, acquiring steel, coal and mining companies.

=== Investments ===
In 2000, Putin came to power. In 2003, Mordashov became a co-owner of Rossiya Bank.

In 2004, Mordashov started investing in US steel companies, purchasing companies in Dearborn, MI and Columbus, Mississippi. The acquisition included the Rouge Plant in Dearborn. He received a loan from the United States Department of Energy to renovate and refurbish the manufacturing plants in Dearborn. The value of the loan, over $370 million, was revoked in 2012, after growing political tensions between the US and Russia.

Between 2004 and 2014, Mordashov and Severstal invested up to $3 billion in both the Dearborn and Columbus plants. In 2011 he sold a number of US assets in Ohio, Maryland and West Virginia to the Renco Group, owned by industrialist Ira Rennert. By 2014 all of Severstal's US investments had been sold for a total of $2.3 billion.

His company Severstal planned a multibillion-dollar project in joint venture with POSCO in eastern India. After ten years of not getting environmental and land clearances, his company opted out in 2008.

In autumn 2007, Mordashov purchased shares in TUI Travel. As he increased his stake to the largest single shareholder through his S-Group Travel, TUI Travel under Michael Frenzel expanded into Eastern Europe and Russia in 2008, China and India in 2009, and sold off its shipping interests, Hapag-Lloyd AG, to the Albert Ballin Consortium in March 2009. In 2014, he held a blocking stake of more than 25% in TUI Travel when TUI Travel was absorbed by TUI Group. In October 2018, he had a 24.9% stake in TUI Group through his S-Group Travel and has been on the TUI Group supervisory board since 2016.

In 2008, Mordashov, Surgutneftegas and Rossiya Bank created the National Media Group, which owned packages in TV channels (Fifth, First, REN TV).

In April 2010, the structures of the Yuri Kovalchuk associated Rossiya Bank, Surgutneftegas and the owner of Severstal Alexei Mordashov gained ownership of a 45% stake of the largest seller of TV advertising in Eastern Europe and Russia, where it controlled 70% of the Russian market in 2007, the "Video International" group (Russian: группа «Видео Интернешнл») from the widow of Yuri Zapol (Russian: Юрий Запол), who was a founder of Video International in 1987, and Vladimir Golubev (Russian: Владимир Голубев) who together owned the largest stakes. (Note: As of 31 December 2004, the other co-owners of the "Video International (VI)" group (Russian: группа «Видео Интернешнл») were Yuri Zapol (Russian: Юрий Заполь) with a 33% stake that, after his death in 2005, passed to his widow Galina, Hovhannes Sobolev (Russian: Оганес Соболев) with a 13.5% stake, Alexander Gurevich (Russian: Александр Витальевич Гуревич) with a 3.75% stake, Vladimir Perepelkin (Russian: Владимир Владимирович Перепелкин) with a 3.75% stake, Elizaveta Akopova (Russian: Елизавета Акопова) with a 1.875% stake, Maxim Boyko (Russian: Максим Владимирович Бойко) with a 5.625% stake, Elena Lukyanova (Russian: Елена Лукьянова) with a 1.875% stake, Anatoly Novikov (Russian: Анатолий Новиков) with a 5.625% stake, and Cypriot Grosora Holdings Ltd (Russian: "Гросора Холдингс Лтд") with a 12.5% stake and Fioto Holdings Ltd (Russian: "Финото Холдингс Лтд") with a 12.5% stake. As of 25 June 2010, 100% of the parent company Video International Group of Companies is owned by the structures of Rossiya Bank, Surgutneftegaz and Alexei Mordashov and, in the authorized capital of OJSC Joint-Stock Bank Rossiya, which was reported in the first quarter of 2010, the OJSC Surgutneftegaz owns almost a 6.6% stake and the CJSC Severgroup, which was the CJSC Severstal Group until 2009 and the beneficiary of which is Alexei Mordashov, owns a 6.7% stake. The general director and former owner with a 6% stake of VI was Sergey Vasilyev, also transliterated as Vasiliev (Russian: Сергей Васильев). At the end of May 2010, ABRos Investments Company LLC (Russian: ООО "Инвестиционная компания "Аброс""), SOGAZ OJSC (Russian: ОАО СОГАЗ) and the largest management company in Russia in terms of assets Leader CJSC (Russian: ЗАО "Лидер"), all of which are affiliated with Rossiya Bank, gained a 45% stake in VI. Prior to Rossiya Bank gaining ownership of VI, nine persons were co-owners of VI.) (Note: On 3 October 2014, Gazprom-Media under the direction of Mikhail Lesin (Note: In 1986, Alexander Akopov (Russian: Александр Завенович Акопов), who knew Mikhail Lesin from Moscow Engineering and Construction Institute (MISI), offered Lesin a position at the Panopticon Theater Studio (Russian: театра-студии «Паноптикум») as a financial manager. Later, Lesin was a co-founder of Video International and Alexander Akopov became a business associate of Leonard Blavatnik's and Blavatnik's Access Industries when Akopov was associated with the Amedia film company (Russian: Кинокомпания «Аме́диа»).) all of which are affiliated with Rossiya Bank, gained a 45% stake in VI. Prior to Rossiya Bank gaining ownership of VI, nine persons were co-owners of VI.</ref> announced that Vi under the leadership of Sergey Vasiliev (Russian: Сергей Васильев), who was the CEO of the Video International group since 2003, will be formed by combining the advertising sales of the "Video International" group (Russian: группа «Видео Интернешнл») with the advertising sales from four firms VGTRK, Channel One, Gazprom-Media Holding and National Media Group and that each of those five firms will own a 20% stake in the new firm "En Vi" (Russian: «Эн Виай») but Mikhail Lesin left Gazprom-Media on 18 December 2014 and the deal did not occur. In January 2015, sales of all terrestrial TV channels, with the exception of NTV and TNT, which became part of Gazprom-Media, were transferred to the structures of the "old" Vi. However, the National Advertising Alliance (NRA) (Russian: Национальный рекламный альянс) was formed in June 2016 with Hovhannes Sobolev, also transliterated as Oganes Sobolev, (Russian: Оганес Соболев) as CEO and without Sergey Vasiliev, who did not get along with Sobolev. Previously, Sobolev was the deputy general director of Vi for a long time and supervised its international business. But after the change of owners Vi, he left the group and pursued his own projects including a project with former News Corp. executive Martin Pompadour in which they sent video content from the United States to China. However, Sobolev left the NRA in April 2017 and Sergey Vasiliev was CEO of NRA from April 2017 until November 2018.)

In 2011, Mordashov purchased 25% of the shares in steam turbine manufacturer, Power Machines, from Siemens. In 2013, with partner Yuri Kovalchuk, Mordashov bought 50% of Tele2 Russia, the country's 4th largest mobile phone operator.

In 2012, Mordashov consolidated Severstal's gold mining assets into one company, Nord Gold N.V. The company was listed on the London Stock Exchange (LSE: NORD LI). In 2013, Nord Gold was awarded a license to embark on gold exploration in Siberia. In 2017 Mordashov announced plans to delist Nordgold from the London Stock Exchange (LSE) citing unfair valuation as the reason. The LSE requires that companies have at least 25% as free float, while Mordashov owns 91% of the company.

In October 2012, Mordashov was elected as chairman of the World Steel Association. In 2011, he was the only Russian participant in a meeting of Bilderberg Club at St Moritz, Switzerland.

In June 2013, Mordashov was the fifth largest shareholder of Rossiya Bank owning 6%.

In 2015, Mordashov stepped down as CEO, appointing former COO Vadim Larin in his place. Mordashov would be appointed as chairman. The changes were confirmed by Severstal.

On 10 October 2017 Mordashov became a Commander of the Order of Merit of the Grand Duchy of Luxembourg.

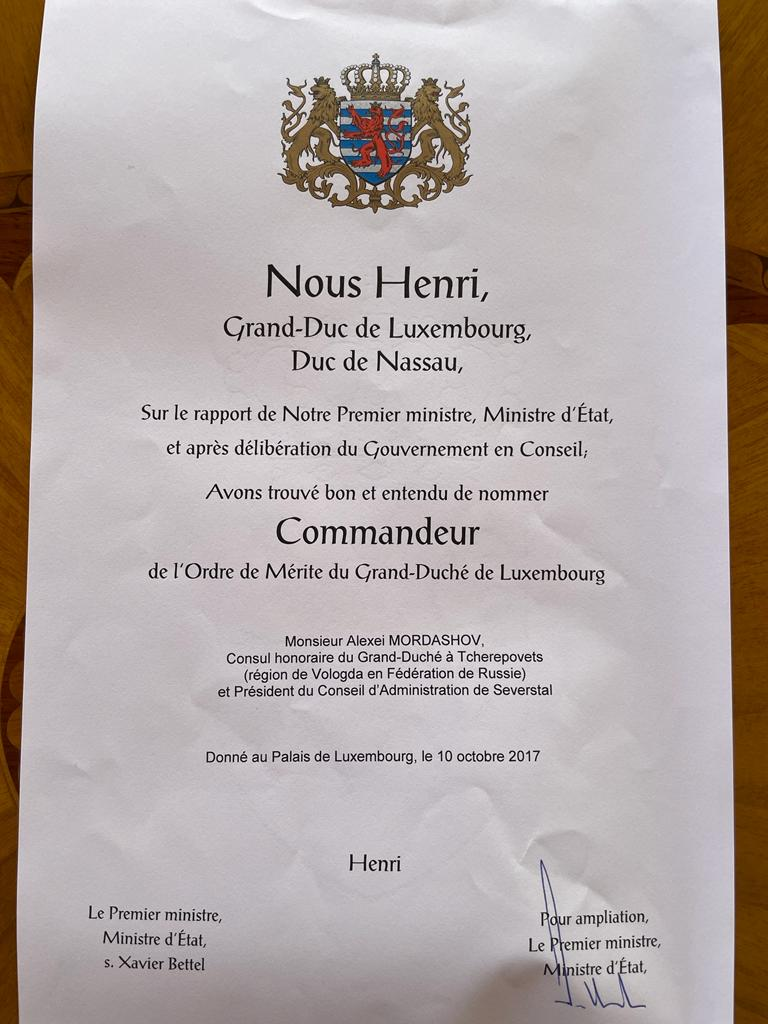
Order of Merit of the Grand Duchy of Luxembourg Alexei Mordashov

=== Sanctions ===
On 28 February 2022, in relation to the 2022 Russian invasion of Ukraine, the European Union blacklisted Mordashov and had all his assets frozen. In early March, the Italian police seized one of his yachts, the Lady M. At that time, another one of his yachts, the Nord, was outside the European Unions jurisdiction in the Seychelles.

He was sanctioned by the UK government in 2022 in relation to the Russo-Ukrainian War.

== Forbes net worth and rankings ==
As of 10 March 2026, according to Forbes, Alexey Mordashov's net worth reached US$37 billion. He returned to the top position among Russia's richest individuals for the first time since 2021 and ranked 57th globally. The growth was mainly driven by a strong rise in gold-related assets such as Nordgold, alongside higher global gold prices, as well as improved results from companies such as Severstal and Lenta. His wealth remains mostly connected to the metals, mining, and industrial sectors.

In 2025, Forbes estimated his wealth at US$28.6 billion, and he ranked second in Russia, reflecting a recovery compared to the previous year. The improvement came from stabilization in commodity markets and better performance of steel and mining assets. This increase indicates a partial re-equilibration following sanction-induced disruptions, while his wealth structure continued to depend on metals, mining, and industrial investments.

In 2024, his net worth, according to Forbes, stood at approximately US$21.1 billion, placing him seventh among Russia's richest individuals. This represented a decline of about US$4.1 billion compared to 2023. The decrease was largely linked to sanctions pressure, limited access to global financial markets, and fluctuations in industrial asset values, especially steel.

By contrast, in 2023, Forbes estimated his wealth at US$25.2 billion, ranking him fifth among Russian billionaires. This recovery, after the sharp drop in 2022, was supported by partial stabilization in financial markets, adaptation to sanctions, and improved commodity prices.

In 2022, his wealth dropped to approximately US$13.2 billion, placing him fifth in Russia and lowering his Forbes global rank significantly. This was a sharp annual decrease of about US$15.9 billion compared to 2021. The main causes were international sanctions and the collapse of Russian stock markets, which strongly affected export-based industrial assets such as Severstal.

In 2021, Forbes estimated his wealth at around US$29.1 billion, placing him first in Russia. This marked a strong increase of US$12.3 billion. The growth was driven by high global demand for steel and industrial products during the post-COVID recovery, as well as strong performance from investments such as Severstal and Nordgold.

Year	Net worth (US$ billion)	Global rank	Rank in Russia	Change (US$ billion)
2026	37.0	57	1	+8.4
2025	28.6	63	2	+3.1
2024	25.5	76	4	+4.6
2023	20.9	79	5	+7.7
2022	13.2	138	5	−15.9
2021	29.1	51	1	+12.3
2020	16.8	54	4	−3.7
2019	20.5	48	4	+1.8

== Pandora Papers ==
The Pandora Papers were a collection of nearly 12 million leaked confidential financial records compiled by the International Consortium of Investigative Journalists. Within those records are details of how a special unit known as "Cypriot" within accounting firm PricewaterhouseCoopers (PwC) helped Mordashov "build the offshore infrastructure of his business empire." The firm helped set up over 65 shell companies in various "secrecy jurisdictions" such as the British Virgin Islands on behalf of a holding company connected to Mordashov. Through these shell companies, Mordashov expanded his presence in the logging, coal, and media industries inside Russia.

== Personal life ==
Mordashov and his first wife Elena (sometimes Yelena) have a son, Ilya, and divorced in 1996.

In 2001, it was revealed in a St Petersburg divorce court that he was paying only $620 a month to support his ex-wife and son, when she sued him for half of his pre-divorce property but lost the case and incurred large fees. The case was eventually settled after she took it to the European Court of Human Rights.

As of 2021, Mordashov owns the yachts Lady M and Nord and a private jet.

By 2001, Mordashov had married his second wife, also Elena, and had had two more sons - Kirill and Nikita.

In 2018–2019, for Kirill and Nikita the KN-holding company was created, to which Mordashov transferred his shares in Nordgold and TUI. In this way, he hoped to transfer business experience to his sons. But in 2021, Nikita lost his share due to unsuccessful studies and leaving for military service.

In 2022, the International Consortium of Investigative Journalists reported that Mordashov transferred most of his ownership stake in tourism conglomerate TUI to a Caribbean shell company controlled by Marina Mordashova who is reportedly the mother of some of his children.

== See also ==
- List of Russian billionaires
