= Sirius Joyport =

Game controller adapter for the Apple II

The Sirius Joyport is a game controller adapter for the Apple II computer designed by Keithen Hayenga and Steve Woita (who were employed by Apple at the time) and then licensed for manufacture and distribution in 1981 by Sirius Software.

The device was meant to address a limitation in the built-in game control offered by the Apple II, by allowing either four Apple-compatible paddles or two Atari CX40 joysticks (but not both types at once) to be read by the computer simultaneously. The built-in game port on the Apple II, II+, IIe, and IIgs supports four analog paddles or two analog sticks, but only 3 buttons.

With the Joyport, a game can support twice as many players as with a standard Apple game port, but game designers had to specifically modify their code to take input from the Atari side of the Joyport. Many of them did so, and this modification is what is often seen listed in Apple II game configuration screens as the "Atari Joyport" option.

The recommended Atari joysticks are switch-driven (i.e. digital), instead of the usual smoother-action analog sticks available for the Apple II. Since the Apple II hardware makes no distinction between two paddles or a single analog joystick plugged into the same jack, it is also possible to connect and read two fully analog joysticks with the Joyport via the paddle jacks, but few (if any) two-joystick games supported this, and Sirius did not suggest it. Why not is unclear, but there may be a noticeable speed advantage when driving two digital rather than analog joysticks on the limited hardware of the time.

== Physical characteristics and packaging ==
The Joyport is a white plastic brick about the size of a paperback novel that connects to the standard internal Apple II gameport and breaks it out into two Atari joystick ports and two Apple ports. A switch in the center controls whether to activate the paddles or the joysticks. Another switch optionally disables either the left- or right-side jacks.

Bundled with the Joyport is Computer Foosball, which was written specifically by Hayenga for up to four players at once on the Apple II. Also included are BASIC and Pascal source code listings of sample programs making use of the Joyport, indicating the hobbyist influence in the market at the time it was released.

== Story of its invention ==
The impetus for the invention of the Joyport came from well-known game designer Bill Budge, who Woita met at Apple and who had been thinking about a way to port games that required manipulation of two joysticks to the Apple II (Crazy Climber was mentioned specifically.). Woita agreed to work on a solution involving Atari controllers, and since at the time Hayenga was already working at Apple on a way to connect four paddles at once, the two hardware engineers began to cooperate on a single device, which was later christened the "Joyport".

Both Woita and Hayenga were hired by Atari, where Woita designed the games Quadrun (1983), Asterix (1984), and TAZ (1984), for the Atari 2600, and Hayenga specialised in the Atari 5200, with the game RealSports Baseball (1983) and a port of Tempest.
