= Bliss (yacht) =

Yacht built by Palmer Johnson in 2014

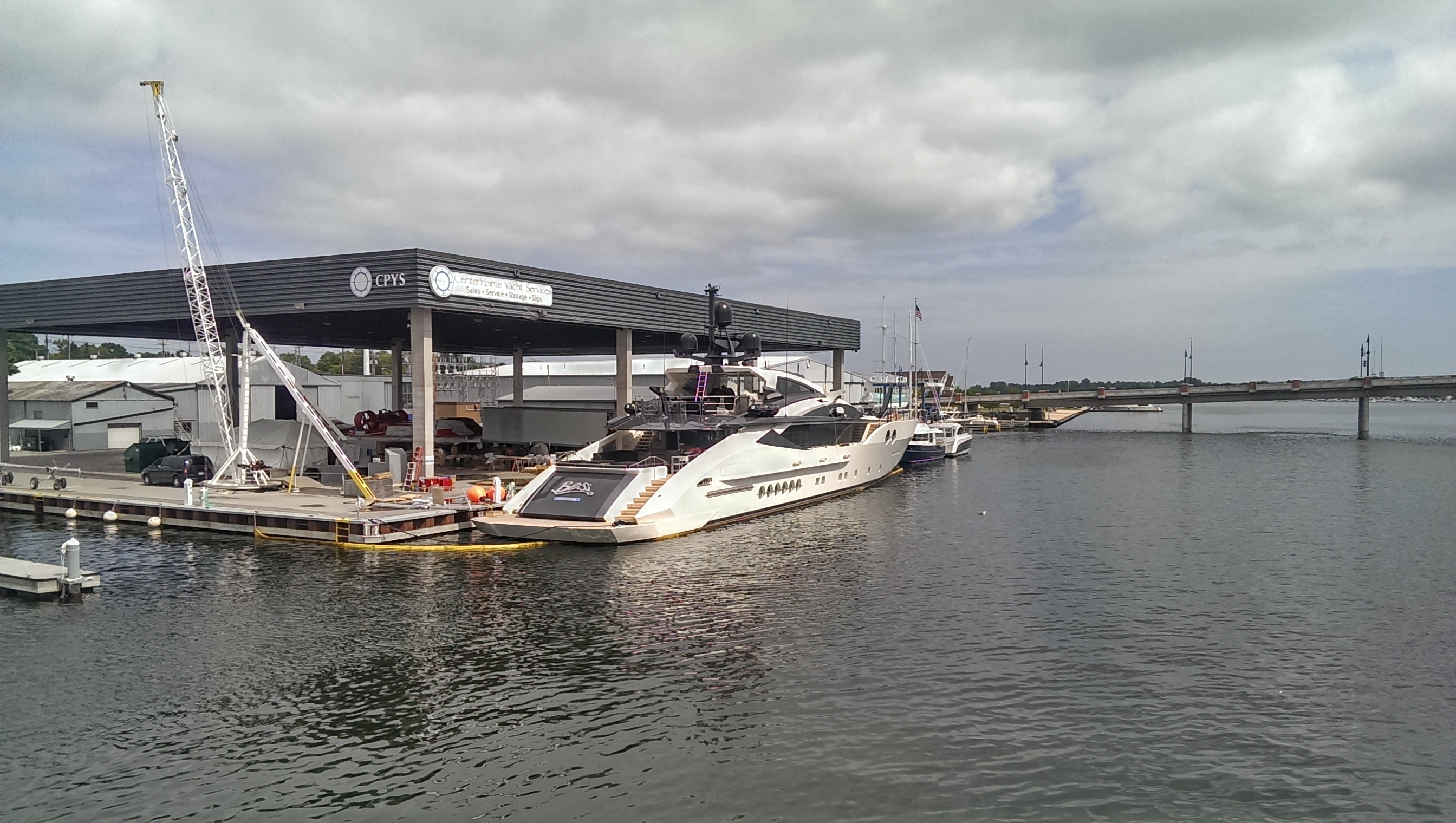

History

Cayman Islands
- Name: Bliss
- Builder: Palmer Johnson
- Yard number: PJ 170#2
- Completed: 2014
- Identification: IMO number: 1011513; MMSI number: 319065700; Callsign: ZGEA5

General characteristics
- Class & type: Semi-displacement motor yacht
- Tonnage: 485 gross tons
- Length: 52.2 m (171 ft)
- Beam: 9.5 m (31 ft)
- Draught: 2.44 m (8.0 ft)
- Propulsion: 2 x MTU - 16V 4000 M93L diesel engines
- Speed: 12 knots (22 km/h) (cruising); 28 knots (52 km/h) (maximum)
- Capacity: 10 persons

Bliss is a super-yacht launched on 5 May 2014 at the Palmer Johnson shipyard in Sturgeon Bay and delivered the next year. The interior and exterior design of Bliss were done by Nuvolari & Lenard. She is currently available for sale.

Bliss has one sistership named DB9. A second sistership named Sanam, built in Florida, was delivered in July 2016.

== Design ==
The length of the yacht is 52.2 m (171 ft) and the beam is 9.5 m (31 ft). The draught of Bliss is 2.44 m (8.0 ft). Both the materials of the hull and the superstructure are made out of Aluminium with teak laid decks. The yacht is Lloyd's registered, issued by Cayman Islands.

== Engines ==
The main engines are two MTU 16V 4000 M93L . Which propel Bliss to a maximum speed of 28 knots (52 km/h).

== See also ==
- DB9
- Luxury yacht
- List of motor yachts by length
- List of yachts built by Palmer Johnson
