= Nord (yacht) =

2020 superyacht by Lürssen

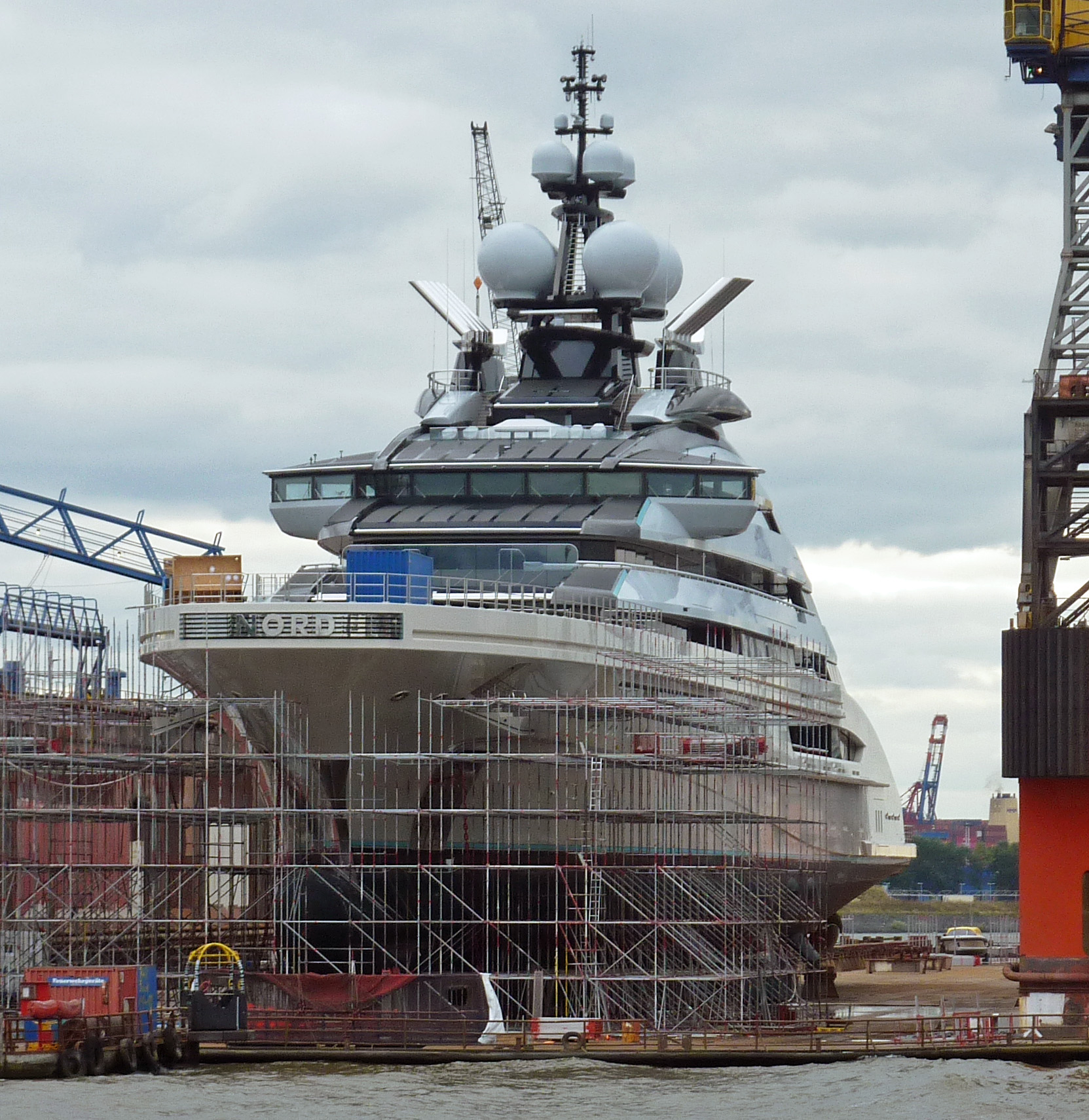
- Nord 2021 at Blohm + Voss, Hamburg

History

Russia
- Name: Nord
- Owner: Alexei Mordashov
- Builder: Lürssen
- Launched: 9 July 2020
- Completed: 2021
- Identification: IMO number: 9853785; MMSI number: 211366970; Callsign: DMCR

General characteristics
- Class & type: Motor yacht
- Tonnage: 9,250 GT
- Length: 142 m (466 ft)
- Beam: 19.5 m (64 ft)
- Draught: 5.40 m (17.7 ft)
- Propulsion: 2x 4,963hp MTU (20V 4000 M73L) diesel engines
- Speed: 20 knots (37 km/h) (maximum); 15 knots (28 km/h) (cruising)
- Capacity: 36 passengers

Nord is a 142 m (466 ft) superyacht launched by Lürssen at their yard near Bremen-Vegesack. Both the yacht's exterior and interior design are the work of Nuvolari & Lenard. Nord, formerly known as Project OPUS, was built under the supervision of yacht brokerage Moran Yacht & Ship based in Fort Lauderdale, Florida. The ship belongs to billionaire Alexey Mordashov and is estimated to be worth $500 million. Following Russia's 2022 invasion of Ukraine the yacht sailed to the Seychelles and then on to the Russian Pacific port of Vladivostok to escape seizure by Western authorities.

== Ownership and history ==
In March 2022, Forbes reported that Nord was still owned by Alexey Mordashov. At 464 feet, the vessel was registered in the Cayman Islands with a value of $300 million.

While under threat of seizure due to sanctions, she arrived in Vladivostok, Russia, on April 11, after leaving Seychelles on March 12, where Nord typically spent winters. Luxury Launches reported that Mordashov avoided seizure by spending $465,000 in fuel and having the ship drive full speed to Vladivostok, also turning off her mandatory location responders and cruising for 6,701 nautical miles straight.

The yacht then sailed on through the Japan Sea to the port of Busan in South Korea, before returning to Vladivostok, where she was again recorded on June 6, 2022. The yacht was in Hong Kong harbour on October 7, 2022. On October 30, 2022, this yacht is at Addu Atoll, Maldives. On February 23, 2023, it was seen in Praslin, Seychelles. On March 8, 2023, it was seen in La Digue, Seychelles, where the guests were preparing for an extraordinary barbecue on Petite Anse Beach.

On June 12, 2023, Nord re-enabled the transponders that had been disabled in October of the previous year. The yacht was found in the Indian Ocean near Indonesia. On June 28, the ship arrived at the port of Vladivostok. On April 25, 2026, the yacht crossed the Strait of Hormuz after maintenance in Dubai in spite of the ongoing crisis.On July 29, 2026, the yacht appear in Benoa Port near the KEK (free economic zone) in Bali, Indonesia.

== Design ==
The dimensions are: length 142 m (466 ft), beam 19.50 m (64.0 ft) and a draught of 5.40 m (17.7 ft). The hull's construction is steel whilst the superstructure is aluminium with teak laid decks. She was flagged in Germany in 2020.

=== Amenities ===
Zero speed stabilizers, gym, elevator, swimming pool, movie theatre, tender garage, swimming platform, air conditioning, BBQ, beach club, spa room, sauna, underwater lights, beauty salon. There are also two helicopter landing pads, one is on the bow of the yacht while the other one is located on the top deck. The one on the top deck can be covered by a hangar that is built into the main mast.

== See also ==
- List of motor yachts by length
- List of yachts built by Lürssen
