= Priscilla Laws =

American physics educator

Priscilla Watson Laws (January 18, 1940 - December 12, 2023) was an American physics educator, known for her work in activity-based physics education. She was a research professor of physics at Dickinson College.

== Education and career ==
Laws majored in physics, with a minor in mathematics, at Reed College, graduating in 1961. She did her graduate studies at Bryn Mawr College, earning a master's degree in experimental nuclear physics in 1963 and completing her Ph.D. in theoretical nuclear physics in 1966.

She joined the Dickinson College faculty as an assistant professor of physics in 1965, and was tenured as an associate professor in 1970. She was promoted to full professor in 1979, and chaired the Department of Physics and Astronomy in 1982 and 1983. She retired as a regular-rank faculty member in 2002, becoming a research professor of physics at Dickinson.

== Research and books ==
Initially, in her research at Dickinson College, Laws focused on the health applications and safety of radiography and X-rays, publishing several books on this topic:

- Medical and Dental X-Rays: A Consumer's Guide to Avoiding Unnecessary Radiation Exposure (Public Citizen Health Research Group, 1974)
- X-rays: More Harm Than Good? How You Can Protect Yourself From Unnecessary Radiation By Understanding the Uses and Misuses of Diagnostic X-rays (Rodale Press, 1977)
- The X-ray Information Book: A Consumers' Guide to Avoiding Unnecessary Medical and Dental X-rays (Farrar, Straus, Giroux, 1983)

In the mid-1980s, Laws shifted her focus to physics education. Her work in this area again includes several books in the Workshop Physics and RealTime Physics textbook suites, and the textbook Understanding Physics (with Karen Cummings, Edward F. Redish, Patrick J. Cooney, and Edwin Taylor, John Wiley & Sons, 2012).

== Recognition ==
In 1993, Laws shared the Charles A. Dana Award for Pioneering Achievement in Education with Ronald K. Thornton, for their development of the Workshop Physics program. In 2010, she and University of Oregon professor David Sokoloff won the APS Excellence in Physics Education Award, for their work with the Activity Based Physics Group, "for twenty-three years of national and international leadership in the design, testing, validation, and dissemination of research-based introductory physics curricula, computer tools and apparatus that engage students in active learning based on the observation and analysis of real phenomena".

Laws was the 1996 winner of the Robert A. Millikan Medal of the American Association of Physics Teachers. She was elected as a Fellow of the American Physical Society (APS) in 2003, after a nomination from the APS Forum on Education, "for her numerous contributions to physics education and for her development of data collecting computer tools and methods to use them efficiently". She won the International Commission on Physics Education Medal in 2007.

== Personal life ==
While a student at Bryn Mawr, in 1965, she married fellow Bryn Mawr physics student Kenneth Lee Laws (1935–2021), who also became a physics professor at Dickinson College. They had two children.

== See also ==
- AtariLab, educational software developed by Laws
