= Khalilah (yacht) =

Yacht built in 2014

History

Cayman Islands
- Name: Khalilah
- Builder: Palmer Johnson
- Yard number: PJ 48#1
- Completed: 2014
- Identification: IMO number: 9744348; MMSI number: 319065600; Callsign: ZGDZ6

General characteristics
- Class & type: Full displacement motor yacht
- Tonnage: 490 gross tons
- Length: 48 m (157 ft)
- Beam: 11 m (36 ft)
- Draught: 2.1 m (6.9 ft)
- Propulsion: 2 x MTU 16V 2000 M94 diesel engines
- Speed: 15 knots (28 km/h) (cruising); 26 knots (48 km/h) (maximum)
- Capacity: 12 persons
- Crew: 9 persons

Khalilah is a super-yacht launched on the 25th of July 2014 at the Palmer Johnson shipyard in the United States and delivered later that year. The composite hull was built in Norway by Brødrene Aa. Both the interior and exterior design of Khalilah were done by an in house team of Palmer Johnson. A sistership is currently under construction.

She is available for charter.

== Design ==
The length of the yacht is 48 m (157 ft) and the beam is 11 m (36 ft). The draught of Khalilah is 2.1 m (6.9 ft). The material used for the yacht is CFRP, which stand for carbon fiber reinforced plastic, with teak laid decks. The yacht has Det Norske Veritas (DNV) classification.

== Engines ==
The main engines are two MTU 16V 2000 M94 with a combined power of 5,200 hp (3,900 kW). Khalilah can reach a maximum speed of 32 knots (59 km/h) and a cruising speed of 28 knots (52 km/h).

== See also ==
- Luxury yacht
- List of motor yachts by length
