= Sanam (yacht) =

History

Cayman Islands
- Name: Sanam
- Builder: Palmer Johnson
- Yard number: PJ 170#3
- Completed: 2016
- Identification: IMO number: 1011525; MMSI number: 319093600; Callsign: ZGFN8

General characteristics
- Class & type: Semi-displacement motor yacht
- Tonnage: 495 GT
- Length: 52.2 m (171 ft)
- Beam: 9.5 m (31 ft)
- Draft: 2.44 m (8.0 ft)
- Propulsion: 2 x MTU - 16V 4000 M93L diesel engines
- Speed: 12 knots (22 km/h) (cruising); 28 knots (52 km/h) (maximum)
- Capacity: 12 persons
- Crew: 8 persons

Sanam is a super-yacht launched 2015 at the Palmer Johnson shipyard in Sturgeon Bay and delivered the next year. She is currently not available for charter.

Sanam has two sisterships named DB9 and Bliss.

== Design ==
The length of the yacht is 52.2 m (171 ft) and the beam is 9.5 m (31 ft). The draught of Sanam is 2.44 m (8.0 ft). Both the materials of the hull and the superstructure are made out of Aluminium with teak laid decks. The yacht is classed by Lloyd's Register and flagged in the Cayman Islands. The main engines are two MTU 16V 4000 M93L, which propel Sanam to a maximum speed of 32 knots (59 km/h).

== See also ==
- Bliss
- DB9
- Luxury yacht
- List of motor yachts by length
- List of yachts built by Palmer Johnson
