= Lady M (yacht) =

American super yacht built in 2013

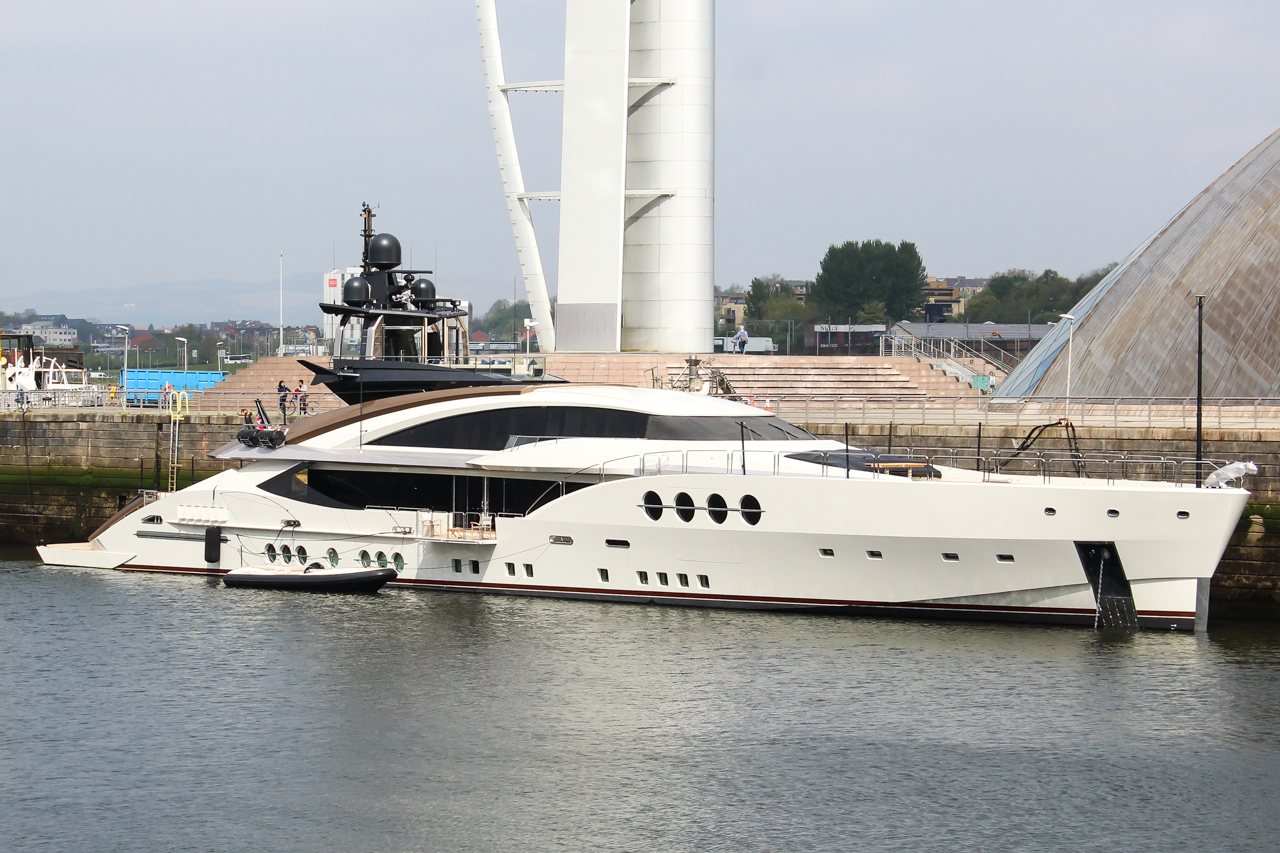
- Lady M berthed at Princes Dock, Glasgow in 2017

History

Cayman Islands
- Name: Lady M
- Owner: Alexei Mordashov
- Builder: Palmer Johnson
- Yard number: PJ 264
- Completed: 2013
- Identification: IMO number: 1012012; MMSI number: 319297000; Callsign: ZGCY9

General characteristics
- Class & type: Motor yacht
- Tonnage: 716 gross tons
- Length: 65 m (213 ft)
- Beam: 9.5 m (31 ft)
- Draught: 2.9 m (9.5 ft)
- Propulsion: 2 x MTU - 16V 4000 M93L diesel engines; 2 x 4.611 hp (3.438 kW)
- Speed: 28 knots (52 km/h) (maximum)
- Capacity: 12 persons
- Crew: 14 persons

Lady M is a super-yacht launched on 13 May 2013 at the American Palmer Johnson shipyard in Sturgeon Bay, Wisconsin and delivered later that year. She was built as Project Stimulus. The interior and exterior of Lady M were designed by Nuvolari & Lenard. She is currently not for charter.

== Design ==
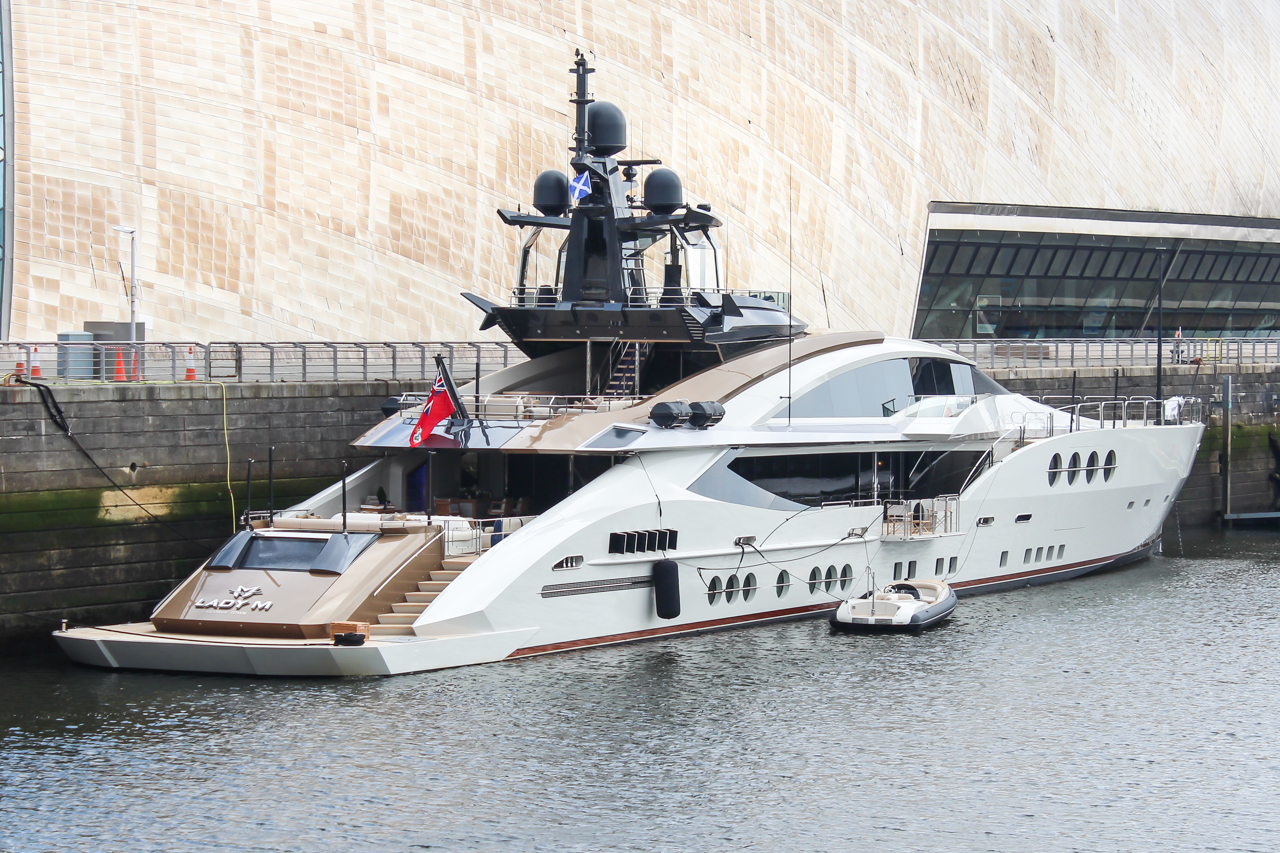
Lady M at Princes Dock in Glasgow in 2017

The length of the yacht is 65 m (213 ft) and the beam is 9.5 m (31 ft). The draught of Lady M is 2.9 m (9.5 ft). Both the materials of the hull and the superstructure are made out of aluminium with teak laid decks. The yacht is Lloyd's registered, issued by Cayman Islands. The ship has a 2534nm range, a pool and can accommodate 12 guests with a crew of 14 people and 6 cabins (1 master, 1 VIP, 2 doubles and 2 twins) and is MCA LY2 compliant.

== Engines ==
The main engines are two MTU 16V 4000 M93L with a combined power of 9,222 hp (6,877 kW). Lady M can reach a maximum speed of 28 knots (52 km/h) with regular cruising speed at 24 knots.

== History ==
Owned by Russian oligarch Alexey Mordashov, Lady M was seized by Italian police due to the EU's sanctions imposed on a number of Russian businessmen as a consequence of the 2022 Russian invasion of Ukraine.

== See also ==
- Luxury yacht
- List of motor yachts by length
- List of yachts built by Palmer Johnson
