= Color clock =

The color clock, or color timer, is a part of the video circuitry of computer graphics hardware that works with analog color television systems. The clock is timed to match the timing of the color standard it works with, typically NTSC or PAL, ensuring that the data being read from the computer memory to create the image on-screen is in sync with the display. Depending on the speed of the color clock, the product of the resolution and number of colors is defined. Slow color clocks of many early games consoles and home computers resulted in limited color palettes at the highest resolutions.
