= DB9 (yacht) =

Yacht built by Palmer Johnson in 2010

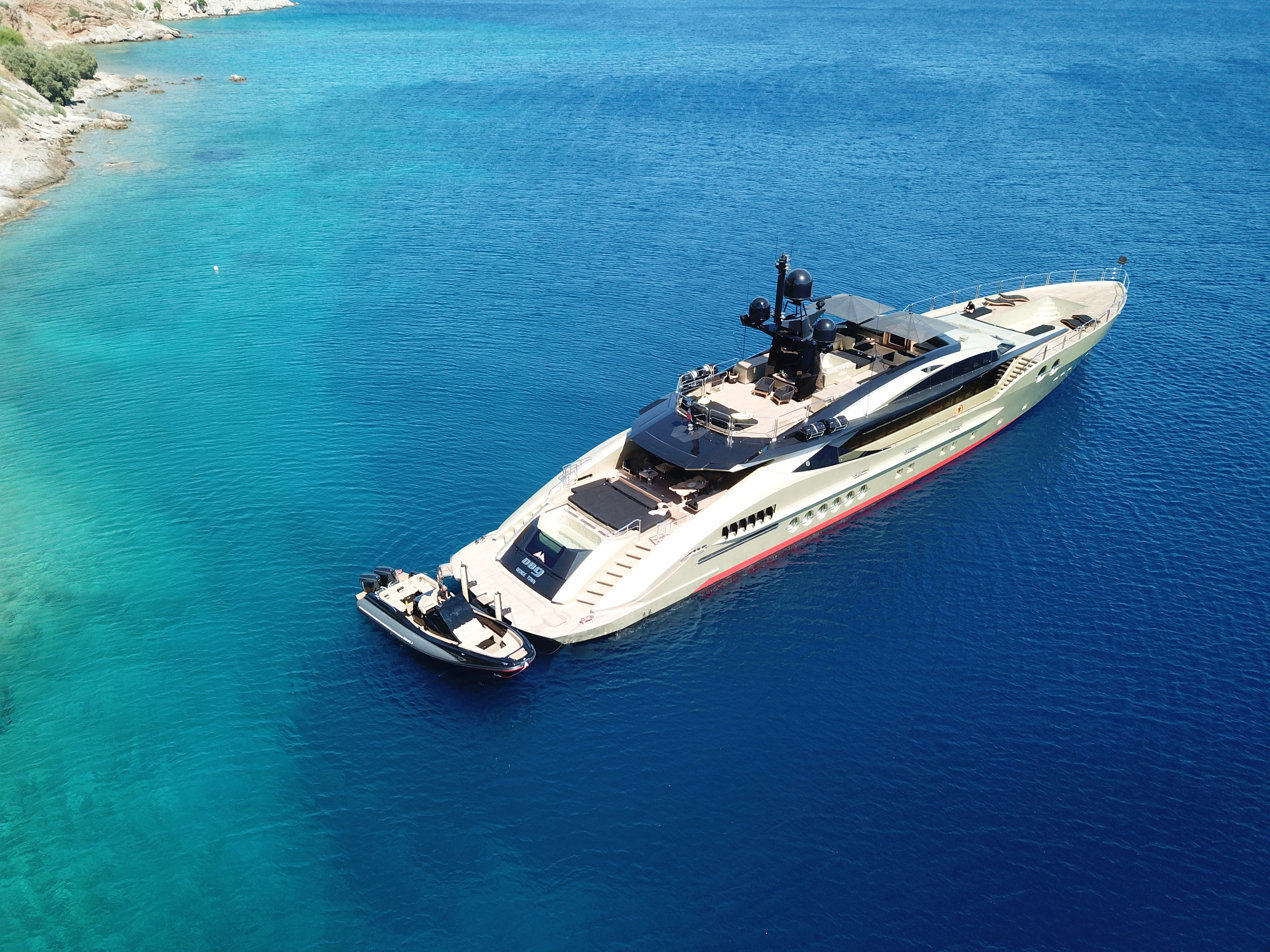

History
- Name: DB9
- Builder: Palmer Johnson
- Yard number: PJ 170#1
- Completed: 2010
- Identification: IMO number: 1011496; MMSI number: 319720000; Callsign: ZGIP1

General characteristics
- Class & type: Semi-displacement motor yacht
- Tonnage: 495 gross tons
- Length: 52.2 m (171 ft)
- Beam: 9.5 m (31 ft)
- Draught: 2.44 m (8.0 ft)
- Propulsion: 2 x MTU - 16V 4000 M93L diesel engines
- Speed: 20 knots (37 km/h) (cruising); 31 knots (57 km/h) (maximum)
- Capacity: 10 persons

DB9 is a super-yacht launched on 13 July 2010 at the Palmer Johnson shipyard in the United Kingdom and delivered the following year. The interior and exterior design of DB9 were created by Nuvolari & Lenard.

DB9 has two sisterships, the first named Bliss. A second sistership named Sanam, built in Florida, was delivered in July 2016.

== Design ==
The length of the yacht is 52.2 m (171 ft) and the beam is 9.5 m (31 ft). The draught of DB9 is 2.44 m (8.0 ft). Both the materials of the hull and the superstructure are made out of Aluminium with teak laid decks. The yacht is Lloyd's registered, issued by Cayman Islands.

== Engines ==
The main engines are two MTU 16V 4000 M93L . Which propel DB9 to a maximum speed of 28 knots (52 km/h).

== See also ==
- Bliss
- Luxury yacht
- List of motor yachts by length
- List of yachts built by Palmer Johnson
