= List of yachts built by Palmer Johnson =

This is a list of all the yachts built by Palmer Johnson, sorted by year.

Biggest by both length and volume upon completion
Biggest by length upon completion
Biggest by volume upon completion

== Table ==
Year	Size		Name		Picture	Reference
Year	Length	Volume	Original	Current (Note: As of 22 October 2022)	Picture	Reference
1967	25.12 m (82 ft)	73 GT	White Eagle			
1967	25.60 m (84 ft)	71 GT	Firebird			
1972	18.8 m (62 ft)	21 GT	Dora IV / Tenacious / War Baby			
1974	24 m (79 ft)	? GT	Tempest			
1974	24.05 m (79 ft)	101 GT	Kialoa III			
1975	26.52 m (87 ft)	70 GT	Aria			
1977	27.42 m (90 ft)	113 GT	Caribana			
1979	30.20 m (99 ft)	101 GT	Fortuna			
1980	31.09 m (102 ft)	144 GT	Lovesong	Banyan		
1983	33.50 m (110 ft)	116 GT	Magic Lady	Toto		
1983	47.70 m (156 ft)	208 GT	Arabella			
1984	24.99 m (82 ft)	84 GT	Tina E	Captivator		
1984	23.77 m (78 ft)	82 GT	Sirocco			
1985	28.04 m (92 ft)	77 GT	Pegasus II	Sunday Morning		
1987	38.50 m (126 ft)	284 GT	Time			
1988	24.38 m (80 ft)	? GT	Force of Habit			
1989	37.49 m (123 ft)	183 GT	Galileo			
1990	37.50 m (123 ft)	164 GT	Maysylph	Axia		
1990	34.75 m (114 ft)	138 GT	Astral	Sirma III		
1990	24.54 m (81 ft)	55 GT	Audacious	Volterra		
1991	38.10 m (125 ft)	228 GT	Mandalay	Kaori		
1992	35.75 m (117 ft)	159 GT	Timoneer	Knickerbocker		
1992	32.77 m (108 ft)	109 GT	Shanakee	Dance Smartly		
1992	27.07 m (89 ft)	139 GT	Isis	Myu		
1993	24.38 m (80 ft)	72 GT	Clueless	Zooom		
1994	44.20 m (145 ft)	349 GT	Lady Jenn	Grand Illusion		
1994	45.50 m (149 ft)	440 GT	La Baroness	Amorazur II		
1995	32.92 m (108 ft)	114 GT	Nazenin III	Keewaydin		
1995	37.05 m (122 ft)	327 GT	Nazenin III	Keewaydin		
1996	46.20 m (152 ft)	499 GT	Turmoil	Pioneer		
1997	43.31 m (142 ft)	389 GT	Paraffin	Lady J		
1997	30.87 m (101 ft)	135 GT	Moon River	Excel		
1998	38.85 m (127 ft)	350 GT	Our Way			
1998	59.40 m (195 ft)	987 GT	La Baronessa	Pearl		
1999	30.48 m (100 ft)	154 GT	Twisted Pair	Fortuna		
1999	25 m (82 ft)	? GT	Oci Ciornie			
1999	27.74 m (91 ft)	144 GT	Grazianna	Nirvana		
2000	39.01 m (128 ft)	321 GT	My Weigh	Aphrodite		
2000	39.01 m (128 ft)	321 GT	Alexis	I Sea		
2000	36.58 m (120 ft)	199 GT	Mostro	Strega		
2001	39.95 m (131 ft)	394 GT	Inevitable	Rasa		
2002	34.14 m (112 ft)	193 GT	Arrowhead			
2002	39.95 m (131 ft)	394 GT	Anson Bell	Helios 2		
2003	39.95 m (131 ft)	394 GT	Unity	4Puppies		
2003	38.11 m (125 ft)	377 GT	Milk and Honey			
2003	36.57 m (120 ft)	197 GT	Cover Drive	Ascari		
2004	43.89 m (144 ft)	444 GT	Four Wishes	Alta		
2004	43.30 m (142 ft)	448 GT	Regency	Incentive		
2005	36.57 m (120 ft)	197 GT	Stanley	Escape		
2005	37.49 m (123 ft)	248 GT	Stanley	Temptation		
2005	36.57 m (120 ft)	197 GT	Khalila	Bagheera		
2005	36.57 m (120 ft)	197 GT	Khalila	Hush		
2006	36.57 m (120 ft)	197 GT	Vanquish	Burn Rate		
2006	37.49 m (123 ft)	255 GT	Muse	Invictus		
2007	41.50 m (136 ft)	309 GT	Waverunner			
2007	45.72 m (150 ft)	380 GT	O'Khalila	Aquanova		
2007	41.50 m (136 ft)	309 GT	Dragon			
2007	45.70 m (150 ft)	380 GT	Hokulani			
2008	36.57 m (120 ft)	224 GT	My Izumi	Izumi		
2008	45.70 m (150 ft)	395 GT	Four Jacks			
2008	45.70 m (150 ft)	395 GT	Clifford II	Equity		
2008	37.49 m (123 ft)	267 GT	Ocean Drive	Blacksheep		
2009	41.10 m (135 ft)	305 GT	Plus Too			
2009	36.57 m (120 ft)	223 GT	Vitamin	Kjos		
2009	41.10 m (135 ft)	305 GT	Cover drive 2	Domino		
2009	45.70 m (150 ft)	398 GT	Oneness	Siren		
2009	45.70 m (150 ft)	399 GT	Blue Ice	Silver Wave		
2010	45.70 m (150 ft)	399 GT	Vantage	Stealth		
2010	52.30 m (172 ft)	495 GT	DB9			
2012	41.45 m (136 ft)	305 GT	Griffin	Defiant		
2013	65 m (213 ft)	716 GT	Lady M			
2014	52.20 m (171 ft)	485 GT	Bliss			
2014	49.50 m (162 ft)	485 GT	Khalilah			
2016	52.20 m (171 ft)	485 GT	Sanam			

== Under construction ==
Planned delivery	Length overall in meters	Name	Reference
2012 (on hold)	81.4	PJ World	
2016	64	PJ 210-2	
2016	48	PJ 48-2	

Palmer Johnson recently signed a contract to build 30 of their new PJ 48 Niniette and PJ 63 Niniette Open Sport series yachts. The Niniette's are jointly developed by Palmer Johnson and Bugatti. The contract for the 30 yachts is valued at over EUR 40,000,000. Palmer Johnson teamed up again with Bugatti to create the PJ 66 Niniette.

== See also ==
- List of large sailing yachts
- List of motor yachts by length
- Luxury yacht
- Sailing yacht
