= Sanam, Iran =

Sanam صنم
- Village
- Location within Iran
- Coordinates: 36°23′52.1″N 52°48′17.2″E
- Country: Iran
- Province: Mazandaran
- County: Qaem Shahr
- Bakhsh: Central
- Rural District: Balatajan

Population (2006)
  - Total: 362
- Time zone: UTC+3:30 (IRST)
  - Summer (DST): UTC+4:30 (IRDT)

Sanam (Persian: صنم, also Romanized as Şanam) is a village in Balatajan Rural District, in the Central District of Qaem Shahr County, Mazandaran Province, Iran. At the 2006 census, its population was 362, in 91 families.
