= AtariLab =

- Original authors: Priscilla Laws; David Egolf
- Developers: Dickinson College; Atari, Inc.
- Release: 1983
- Platform: Atari 8-bit

AtariLab was a laboratory instrumentation system and related computer software for the Atari 8-bit computers intended to be used both at home and in science classroom settings in schools. The concept was developed by Priscilla Laws, a physics professor at Dickinson College, and developed in partnership with Atari, Inc. The AtariLab Starter Set with the Temperature Module was released in late 1983, and followed by the add-on Light Module in February 1984. Several other modules were planned for future release.

The system was just coming onto the market when Atari was sold to Jack Tramiel and all development on the system ended. By this time the development company organized by Laws had ported the system to the Commodore 64 and Apple II. Small numbers of the Atari and C64 versions were sold commercially, but the Apple II version was never completed. The company went on to produce a professional version of the system for the IBM PC platform, which sold tens of thousands of examples.

== History ==
=== Impetus ===
AtariLab came about after Laws saw a thermistor dipped into ice water being sampled and graphed on an expensive laboratory system. Instead of having to periodically sample a thermometer and then use the data to produce a graph, the computer was creating this in real time, and "it blew me away." Considering a common experiment carried out by students, producing a cooling curve for hot water, the system would reduce perhaps 15 to 20 minutes of work to a few moments. This would free up so much time the students would be able to carry out multiple experiments in a typical lab period, perhaps testing the effects of insulation, or producing curves for different materials in a single sitting.

=== Development ===
Laws began using similar devices in her teaching lab, and as Laws' son owned an Atari 8-bit computer, began development of a recording and graphing system on that platform. The Atari was ideal for the task for two reasons. One was because it had a high-resolution graphics mode that was, at the time of introduction, one of the best displays available and easily accessed through Atari BASIC. Another was that the engineers had equipped it with joystick ports of unusual flexibility, which allowed them to be used as a general purpose voltage sampling input. Combining a simple sampling board with software written by a 15-year-old middle-school student, David Egolf, the basic concept was quickly developed.

Laws approached Atari with the idea of commercializing the system, and found a receptive audience in Leslie Wolf, Atari's product manager for Atari Logo and other educational materials, and a middle manager, Mike Nalblah. Forming a company to develop the concept, Laws received some funding from the College and began development. Laws flew to Atari several times to discuss the concept, how to package it, and what sort of course material to include.

The AtariLab Starter Set with the Temperature Module was released in late 1983, with the Light Module following soon after in February 1984. The system received considerable press, and won the Software of the Year Award for 1984 from Classroom Computer Learning magazine. Articles written at the time talked about Biofeedback, (Note: The biofeedback module might be what InfoWorld calls the Heartbeat Module, or potentially the Lie Detector.) Timekeeper, Lie Detector, Reaction Time, pH, and different Mechanics modules. but the only other module under active development at the time was a Motion Module that used an ultrasonic motion sensor for various dynamics experiments.

By early 1984, the effects of the video game crash of 1983 left Atari in turmoil, and the company was losing over a million dollars a day. The owners, Warner Communications, became desperate to sell the company, and eventually did so to Jack Tramiel, on 1 July 1984, for $50 cash and $240 million in promissory notes. The AtariLab system was caught up in the confusion, and Wolf was laid off. Production continued only because Wolf noticed that no one knew who was paying the salaries of the small production team, and she told them to keep working until their paychecks stopped arriving.

=== After Atari ===
By this time, Laws's holding company had released the Commodore 64 version, but Commodore was soon in similar turmoil. The Apple II version never shipped. With the market rapidly moving to the IBM PC, they decided to refocus on that platform.

Continuing work on the basic concept, Laws began to develop Workshop Physics, an introductory physics course based entirely on computerized labwork instead of lectures. She partnered with Ron Thornton of Tufts University and Robert Tinker of the Technical Education Research Centers (TERC), and began development of the coursework. Looking for someone to build an adaptor, she contacted a former Atari colleague, Ron Budworth, who had since semi-retired in Silicon Valley. As it became clear that the program had wide appeal, Tinker and the TERC claimed ownership over the design. Laws's attorney ultimately relied on a recent Supreme Court case about a sculpture of Martin Luther King Jr., in which the court decided that basic descriptions, i.e. "a sculpture of MLK", did not imply ownership of the ultimate expression of the idea. Accordingly, as Budworth had carried out all of the actual development of an idea amounting to "an analog adaptor for the Atari port", the design was considered his.

Development of the interface continued and they ultimately made a distribution deal with friends who had recently formed Vernier Software and Technology to market into this field. Budworth produced the boards and sold them through Vernier as the ULI, short for Universal Laboratory Interface. Sales ultimately ran to 40,000 units before newer designs made it obsolete. Vernier remains the leading worldwide supplier of computerized data collection equipment. The courses originally developed as part of the Workshop Physics program have since developed into a whole suite of similar programs and books.

== Description ==
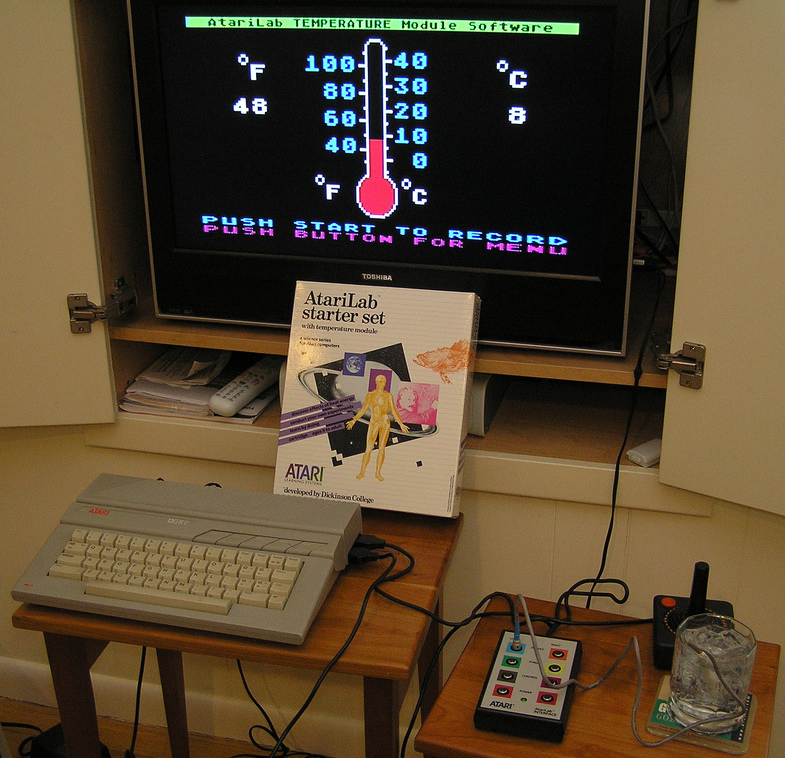
The system being used to measure the temperature of a glass of water.

The Atari computer's POKEY chip includes eight potentiometer ("pot") input lines, connected to eight capacitors and then in pairs to four joystick ports, each port containing two input lines. (Number of ports was later reduced to two in newer computer models). These lines were originally intended to connect up to eight paddle controllers. A paddle consisted of a potentiometer, whose two terminals would connect to the joystick port's +5V pin on one side, and a pot input pin on the other. Thus the paddle's setting influenced time it would take the capacitor to charge fully. POKEY would measure these times for each of the eight paddles, and present them as values (between 0 and 228) in its POT0-POT7 registers. Writing to POKEY's POTGO register would reset the chip's counters, allowing to repeat the measurement.

The AtariLab hardware consisted largely of a single circuit board that broke out the pins in the joystick port into RCA jacks. The adaptor was about the size of a contemporary multimeter, and like those, had a stand on the back so it stood up at an angle on a desktop. The RCA jacks were color coded and matched the colors on the ends of the plugs on the probes. Setting up a probe required nothing more than plugging into the same-colored socket and then running the associated software, supplied on ROM cartridge. The only other feature of the adaptor was a red LED that indicated power was available, which was true whenever it was plugged in and the computer was turned on.

The associated software had a variety of modes, including a real-time display and a recording chart. In the case of the Temperature Module, for instance, the system could display a thermometer showing the instantaneous temperature, or a strip chart continually recording the temperature over time. The system was controlled mainly through a joystick plugged into one of the other ports. Since the POT0-POT7 registers could also be read from Atari BASIC using PEEK commands, writing custom software for the system was a simple task.
